= Fforestfach =

Coordinates: 51.6451°N 3.9823°W

- Location within Swansea
- OS grid reference: SS613956
- Principal area: Swansea
- Preserved county: West Glamorgan
- Country: Wales
- Sovereign state: United Kingdom
- Post town: SWANSEA
- Postcode district: SA5
- Dialling code: 01792
- Police: South Wales
- Fire: Mid and West Wales
- Ambulance: Welsh
- UK Parliament: Swansea West
- Senedd Cymru – Welsh Parliament: Swansea West

Fforestfach is a suburban district of Swansea, Wales which developed during the Victorian era as part of the expansion of Swansea, and to service several collieries in the area. It lies within the Cockett ward, between the districts of Waunarlwydd and Cwmbwrla, and contains the areas of Cadle and Ravenhill.

The area is residential combined with light industry and retail park; and is close to the M4 motorway and several dual carriageways. Corgi Toys and Walkers Crisps had factories in the area, but they have now ceased their operations here. Local amenities include the premises of the City of Swansea Gymnastic Club, and Ravenhill Park. The nearby places are Portmead, Gendros, Waunarlwydd and Penllergaer.

== History ==
The village of Fforestfach developed around the crossroad, Fforestfach Cross, of the A483, Carmarthen Road, and the A4216 road from Cockett. Carmarthen Road was the old turnpike or mail coach road from Swansea to Carmarthen.

Bethlehem Chapel in the Cadle area, was originally built in 1840, although the present, Grade II listed building was built in 1866.

== Economy ==
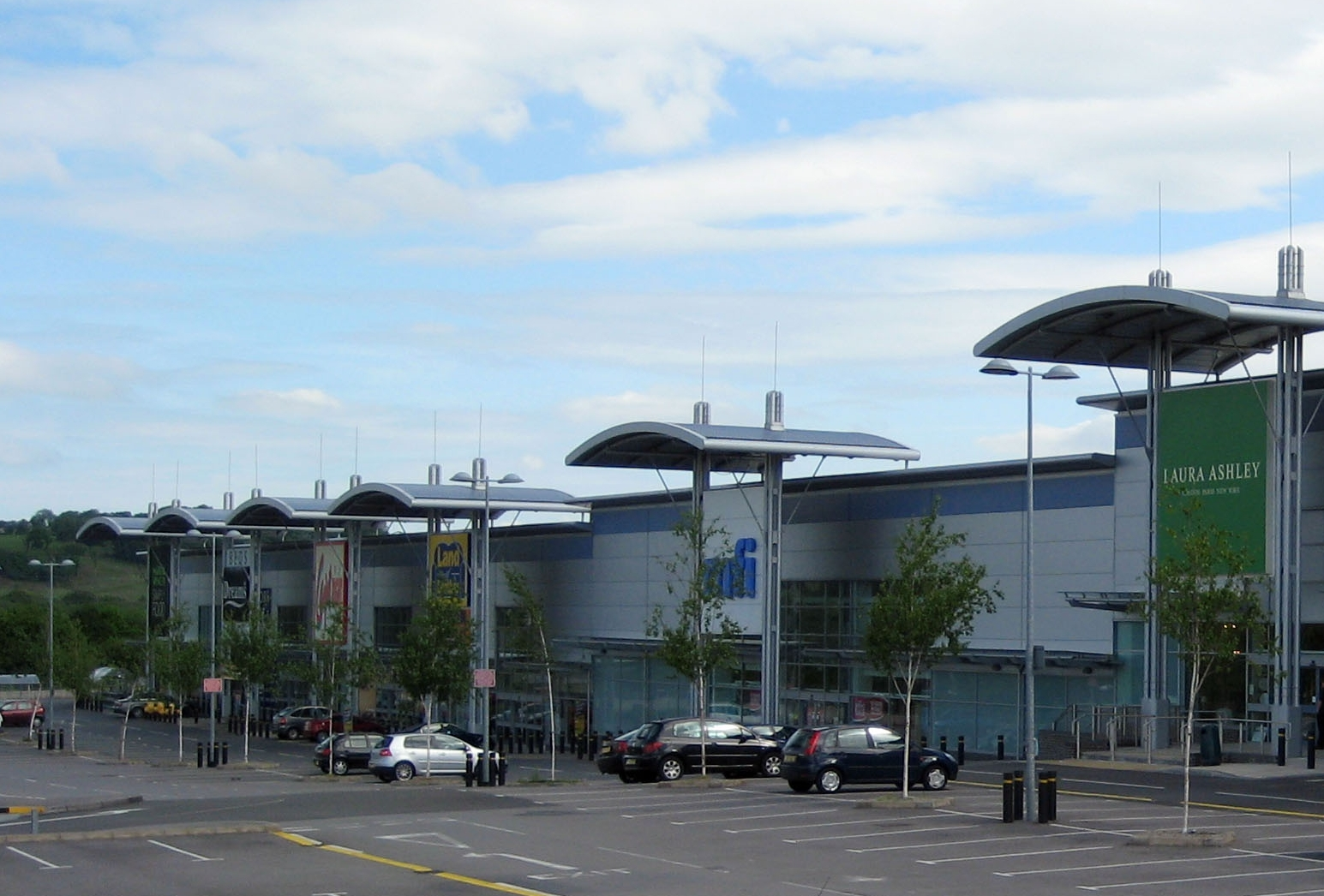
Pontarddulais Road Retail Park

Fforestfach is home to an out of town shopping complex centred on Pontarddulais Road in the Cadle area to the west. The shopping area to the northeast of Pontarddulais Road has existed since the 1970s and is now called "Pontarddulais Road Retail Park". In November 2006 a Park and Ride scheme was introduced to ferry shoppers into Swansea city centre.

The area to the southwest of Carmarthen Road/Pontarddulais Road, called Parc Fforest-Fach, developed in the early 2000s. The Tesco Extra store at Parc Fforestfach had a gross floorspace of 112,000 sq ft (10,400 m^{2}) in 2003 (and has since been expanded) making it the largest in Wales.

Swansea West Business Park is the largest post-war industrial estate in Swansea. It is the location of 140 businesses employing 1,500 people. There was once a greyhound stadium based at the site, which is now closed and earmarked for re-development.

== Amenities ==
Local amenities include the premises of the City of Swansea Gymnastic Club, and Ravenhill Park. A chocolate factory on the business park, named "The Chocolate Factory", has guides and exhibits showing the process of making chocolate.

Ravenhill Park was opened in 1931 after Lowe's farm was purchased for £4,170.

The local primary school is the Cadle Primary School on Middle Road.

== Listed buildings ==
Grade II listed buildings in Fforestfach include:

- Capel Bethlehem including attached Vestry Block on Carmarthen Road
- Carmarthen Road War Memorial
- Walker Snack Food Factory on Pontarddulais Road

== Cockett Railway Station ==
Cockett railway station not currently open on the West Wales Line.

== Greyhound racing ==
Fforestfach had two greyhound stadiums. The first known as 'White City' on Pen-llywn-eithen farm traded from 1929 until 1946 and the second was known as the Swansea Greyhound Stadium on Ystrad Road and was open from 1949 until 2009.
