= Jen Wilson =

Welsh Jazz researcher

- Born: Mount Pleasant, Swansea
- Died: June 2023
- Spouse: Mike Wilson

Academic background
- Education: University of Wales
- Thesis: Syncopated Ladies: British Jazzwomen 1880–1995 and their Influence on Popular Culture (1996)

Academic work
- Notable works: Freedom Music: Wales, Emancipation and Jazz 1850–1950

Jen Wilson (died June 2023) was a Welsh jazz musician, archivist, and writer. She founded Jazz Heritage Wales in 1987, contributing her own oral histories told by women who worked in the Jazz scene. These recordings are now held in the British Library Sound Archive and have formed the basis for several BBC documentaries.

== Personal life ==
Wilson was born and raised in Mount Pleasant, Swansea. She was a self-taught jazz pianist and enjoyed performing regularly in pubs throughout Wales. Wilson was educated at Swansea Secondary Technical School for Girls, which she left at 16. She later worked as a secretary for the British Anthracite Company, as a care worker in London, and an auxiliary nurse at Mount Pleasant Hospital until the 1980s. Wilson then began working as an administrator at Swansea University, before retiring in 1996. In 1965, she married her husband, Mike Wilson whom she had three children with.

Wilson was also a member of the Swansea Women's History Group which she joined in the 1980s. She regularly visited the Greenham Common Women's Peace Camp, taking part in protests against the cruise missiles that were stored on the site.

== Jazz Research ==
Wilson began archiving women's history within the jazz scene after she became concerned that female jazz musicians histories weren't visible. Her collection of records, books, and memorabilia became the foundation of Women in Jazz, a charity she founded in 1987. In later years Jen credited Kathy Stobart for inspiring them to start the archive. The charity was later renamed to become Jazz Heritage Wales. In 2008 the Swansea University agreed to house the Jazz Heritage Wales collection, which contains records dating back to 1900.

The Jazz Heritage Wales archive is home to Wilson's 1996 Master's dissertation for University of Wales, Syncopated Ladies: British Jazzwomen 1880–1995 and their Influence on Popular Culture. It is considered one of the few pieces of research that considers the role of women in British jazz. It is also home to series of oral histories that Wilson recorded with women who worked in the jazz scene. Wilson began recording these histories while working at Swansea University, and these recordings were later used in the 2023 BBC One documentary, My Name Is Ottilie. The recordings are also archived in the British Library Sound Archive.

Wilson's work was the inspiration behind Alan Plater's 2001 three part BBC Radio 4 audio drama, The Devil's Music. Wilson also contributed to the 2014 BBC Radio 4 show, The Lost Women of British Jazz, produced by Hannah Loy and Janine H Jones.

In October 2004 her research around a freed slave who escaped to Swansea led to Swansea College performing a stage show at the Dylan Thomas Centre for Black History Month. The play was centred around Willis, who escaped slavery in 1832, working on a galley that arrived in Swansea in February 1833, where he was declared a free man by the mayor.

Wilson performed at the opening of the Brecon Jazz Festival in 2016. She was appointed Honorary Professor of Practice by University of Wales Trinity St David the same year.

In 2019 Wilson published Freedom Music: Wales, Emancipation and Jazz 1850-1950 through University of Wales Press. During the COVID-19 pandemic Wilson hosted a virtual tour of the Jazz Heritage Wales exhibition How Jazz Came To Wales for the Brecon Jazz Festival. The exhibition opened in September 2019.

In 2021 Jessie Donaldson, a Welsh anti-slavery campaigner, was memorialised with a blue plaque following nomination to the Swansea Council by Wilson. Wilson had extensively documented Donaldson's life and activism in the Underground Railroad during the 1850s.

Wilson formed the all women Allstars Swing Band, based in Swansea. She also composed and co-arranged Twelve Poems; The Dylan Thomas Suite, a collection based off the works of Dylan Thomas.

Wilson died in June 2023, aged 78.

== Awards ==
In 2014 Wilson honoured at the WCVA Wales Volunteer of the Year in 2014 for her work archiving women's Jazz histories across Wales and Britain and for her work at Jazz Heritage Wales.

In 2015, she was awarded the Points of Light Award by David Cameron for her work with Jazz Heritage Wales.

She was awarded the St David Award for culture in 2017.
