= Swansea Deanery =

Roman Catholic deanery in the Archdiocese of Cardiff-Menevia

The Swansea Deanery is a Roman Catholic deanery in the Archdiocese of Cardiff-Menevia, previously in the Diocese of Menevia, that covers several churches in Swansea and the surrounding area.

The dean is centred at St Joachim & St Anne's Church in Swansea.

== Churches ==
- St David's Priory Church, Swansea
- St Benedict, Clydach
- Sacred Heart, Ystradgynlais - served from Clydach
- Sacred Heart, Morriston
- St Peter Church, Landore
- Holy Cross, Gendros
- St Joachim and St Anne, Dunvant
- St Illtyd, St Thomas
- St Benedict, Sketty
- Our Lady Star of the Sea Church, Mumbles
- Our Lady of Lourdes, Townhill
- St Joseph's Cathedral, Swansea

== Gallery ==
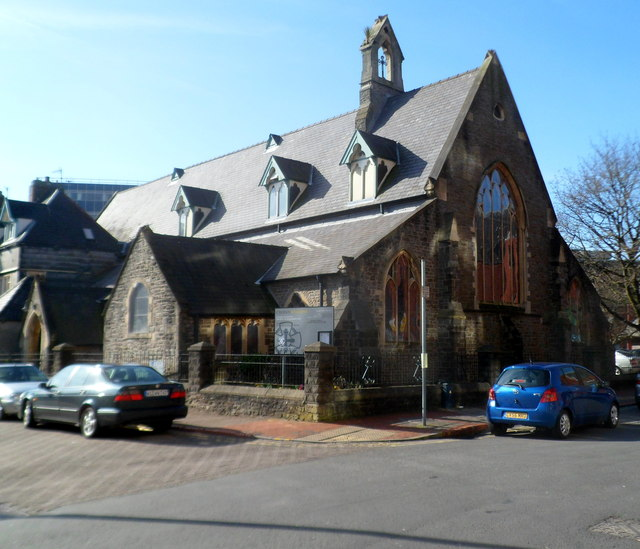
St David's Priory Church, Swansea

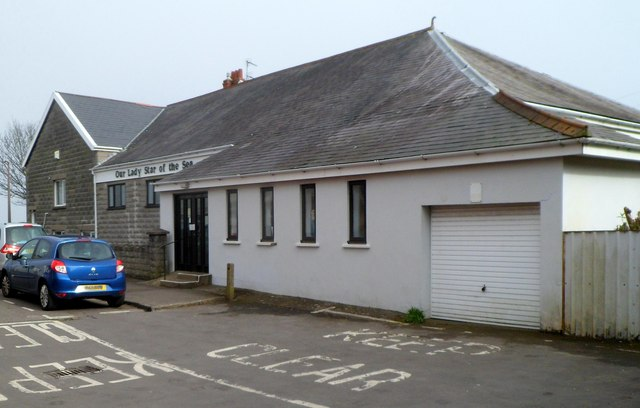
Our Lady Star of the Sea Church, Mumbles

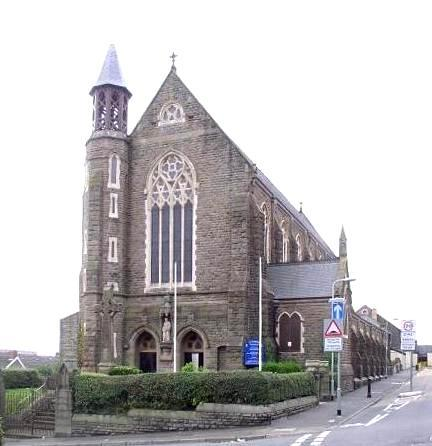
St Joseph's Cathedral, Swansea
