= M4 corridor =

Motorway-adjacent area in England and Wales

Coordinates: 51.5°N 1.5°W

The M4 corridor is an area in the United Kingdom adjacent to the M4 motorway, which runs from London to West Wales. It is a major hi-tech hub. Important cities and towns linked by the M4 include (from east to west) London, Slough, Bracknell, Maidenhead, Reading, Newbury, Swindon, Chippenham, Bath, Bristol, Caldicot, Magor, Newport, Cardiff, Llanharan, Port Talbot, Swansea and Llanelli. The area is also served by the Great Western Main Line, the South Wales Main Line, and London Heathrow Airport. Technology companies with major operations in the area include Adobe, Amazon, Citrix Systems, Dell, Dragon International Studios, Lexmark, LG, Microsoft, Novell, Nvidia, O2, Oracle, Panasonic, SAP, Siemens Mobility, Symantec and Vodafone.

== England ==
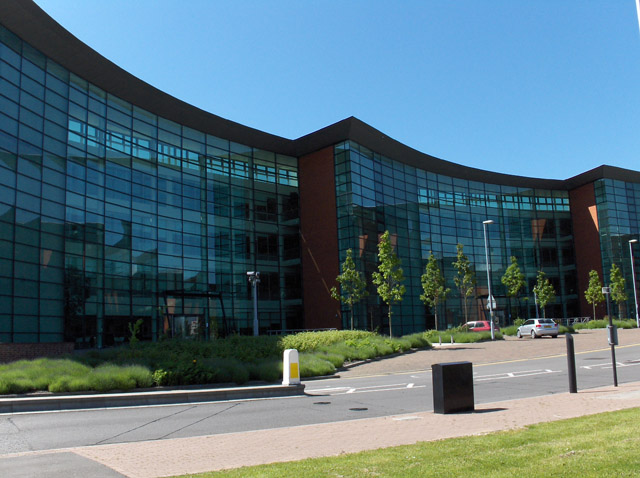
Reading International Business Park. This crescent of offices beside the A33 are home to Verizon, a telecommunications company. They were formerly the European headquarters of WorldCom before its demise.

The east end of the English M4 corridor is home to a large number of technology companies, particularly in Berkshire, Swindon and the Thames Valley. For this reason this part of the M4 corridor is sometimes described as England's "Silicon Valley". Slough, Windsor, Maidenhead, Reading, Bracknell and Newbury are the main towns in the Berkshire stretch of the M4.

Reading is home to many information technology and financial services businesses, including Cisco, Microsoft, ING Direct, Oracle, Prudential, Yell Group and Ericsson. Vodafone has a major corporate campus in Newbury, O2 plc is in Slough. Maidenhead is the home of Hutchison 3G UK's headquarters and Tesla Motors' UK head office.

Investment has gradually spread westwards since the 1980s. In the west, the interchange of the M4 and M5 motorways north of Bristol had seen considerable growth of industries by the mid 1990s.

== Wales ==
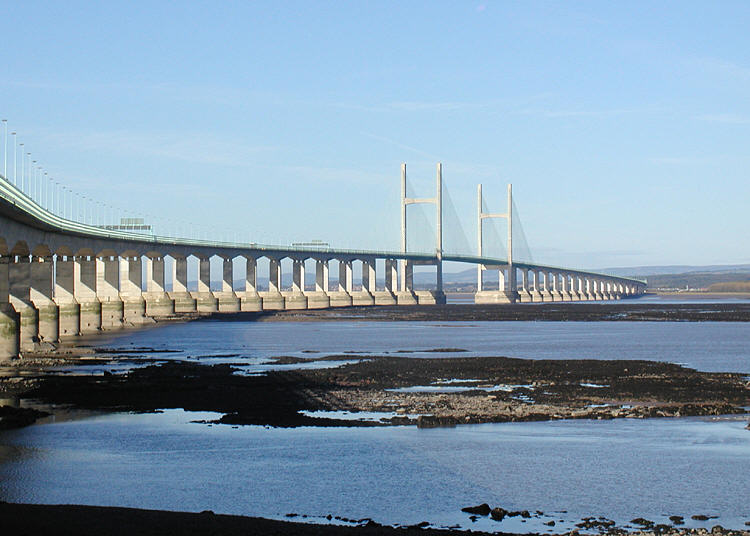
The Second Severn Crossing carries the M4 motorway between England and Wales.

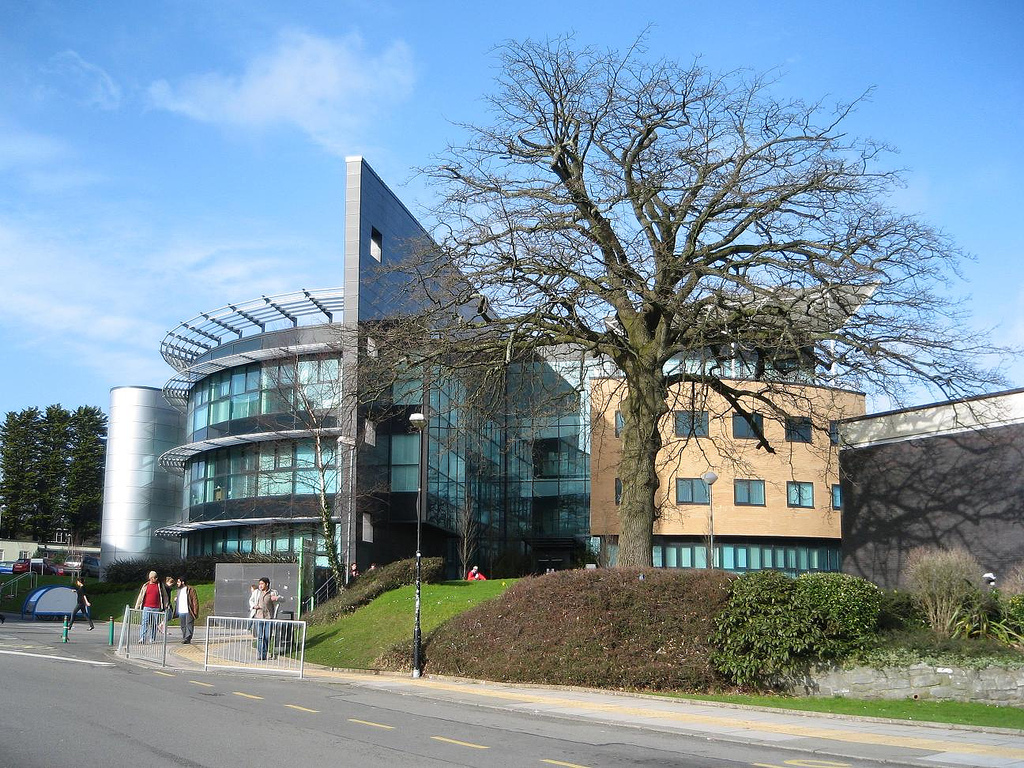
The Digital Technium at Swansea University

The major Welsh towns and cities along the M4 corridor are Bridgend, Cardiff, Llanelli, Neath, Newport, Port Talbot and Swansea. South Wales is an industrial heartland of the UK.

The 1980s and 1990s saw the development of the Swansea Enterprise Park. The Celtic Manor Resort, adjacent to the M4 in Newport, has received significant investment and hosted the 2010 Ryder Cup. Newport has seen significant growth in the electronics industry since the late 1980s. The 1990s saw significant investment in Cardiff, such as in Cardiff Gate and the Cardiff Bay area. One site of note on the M4 corridor is Port Talbot Steelworks – the largest steel producer in the UK and one of the biggest in Europe.

The opening of the Second Severn Crossing in 1996 resulted in the previous M4 and bridge, serving Chepstow, being renumbered the M48, although the area is still generally considered as falling within the M4 corridor.

Since the start of the 21st century there has been evidence of more investment west of Cardiff, such as:

- Port Talbot
  - Aberavon Beach
  - Baglan Industrial Park
  - Baglan Energy Park
  - 33-acre (13 ha) Amazon.co.uk fulfilment centre at Crymlyn Burrows
- Swansea
  - Maritime Quarter
  - SA1 development
  - Swansea Vale
  - Felindre
- Llanelli
  - Dafen/Llanelli Gate
  - Parc Hendre
  - Parc Trostre and Parc Pemberton
  - Llanelli Waterside, including North Dock and Delta Lakes
  - Ffos Las racecourse
- Cross Hands
  - Cross Hands Food Park
  - Cross Hands Business Park

The Welsh section of the corridor has sometimes been called "Cwm Silicon" (Welsh for "Silicon Valley").

== See also ==
- Great Western Cities
- Silicon Fen
- Silicon Glen
- Silicon Gorge
