= Libanus Chapel =

Libanus Chapel may refer to:

- Libanus Chapel, Aberaman, Rhondda Cynon Taf, Wales
- Libanus Chapel, Swansea, Wales
- Tabernacle Chapel, Morriston, Swansea, Wales

== See also ==
- Libanus (disambiguation)
