= St David's Priory Church, Swansea =

St David's Priory Church
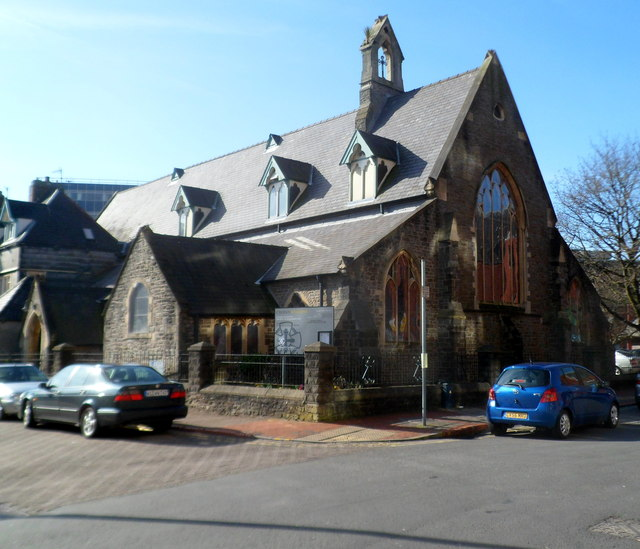
- St David's Priory Church
- 51.6179°N 3.942°W
- Location: Swansea
- Country: Wales
- Denomination: Roman Catholic
- Website: Official site

History
- Status: Parish church
- Founder: Fr Charles Kavanagh
- Dedication: Saint David

Architecture
- Functional status: Active
- Heritage designation: Grade II listed
- Designated: 30 March 1987
- Architect: Charles Hansom
- Style: Gothic Revival
- Completed: 8 September 1847
- Construction cost: £1300

Administration
- Province: Cardiff-Menevia
- Archdiocese: Cardiff-Menevia
- Deanery: Swansea

St David's Priory Church is a Catholic parish church in Swansea, Wales. It is the oldest Catholic church in Swansea. It was built in 1847 and replaced a church on the same site that was constructed around 1808. It is called the Priory Church after the Benedictines ministered there from 1873. It was designed by Charles Hansom in the Gothic revival style of architecture. It is located on St David's Place, between LC, Swansea and Swansea Minster, in the centre of the city. It is a Grade II listed building.

== History ==
=== Foundation ===
In 1810, before Catholic Emancipation in 1829, a Catholic chapel was built. It was situated in a modified barn building on Nelson Street. It was paid for by Maria Fitzherbert, who was once illegally married to George IV. The chapel was served by a priest from France, Albert Sejan. He was once chaplain to Louis XVI.

=== Construction ===
In 1839, a new priest started serving the chapel, Charles Kavanagh. He worked serving the Catholics in Aberavon, Neath and Llanelli during the Great Irish Famine. The chapel was too small and dilapidated for the growing congregation, so he set about raising funds for a new, larger church. Construction of the church was paid for by Lady Catherine Eyre, Mrs Shewin and donations from the public. The church was designed by Charles Hansom. It cost £1300 and was opened on 8 September 1847. The stained-glass window depicting the resurrection was given to the church by George Grant Francis. At its opening, the Bishop William Ullathorne, the Vicar Apostolic of the Western District, preached at the Mass.

=== Developments ===
From 1856 to 1873, the priest at the church was Peter Lewis. He was responsible for the building of the school, a nearby convent, and the first post-Reformation Catholic church in Greenhill. He expanded St David's Priory Church and hired the architect Benjamin Bucknall to design the extensions. In 1873, the parish was handed over to the Benedictines and they made it a priory church.

== Parish ==
In 2009, the Benedictines left and returned administration of the parish to the local diocese, who continue to serve the parish today. St Illtyd's Church in Danygraig is served from St David's Priory Church. St Illtyd's Church has two Sunday Masses at 6:00 pm on Saturday and at 10:00 am on Sunday morning. St David's Priory Church has two Sunday Masses at 11:30 am and at 6:00 pm.

== Interior ==
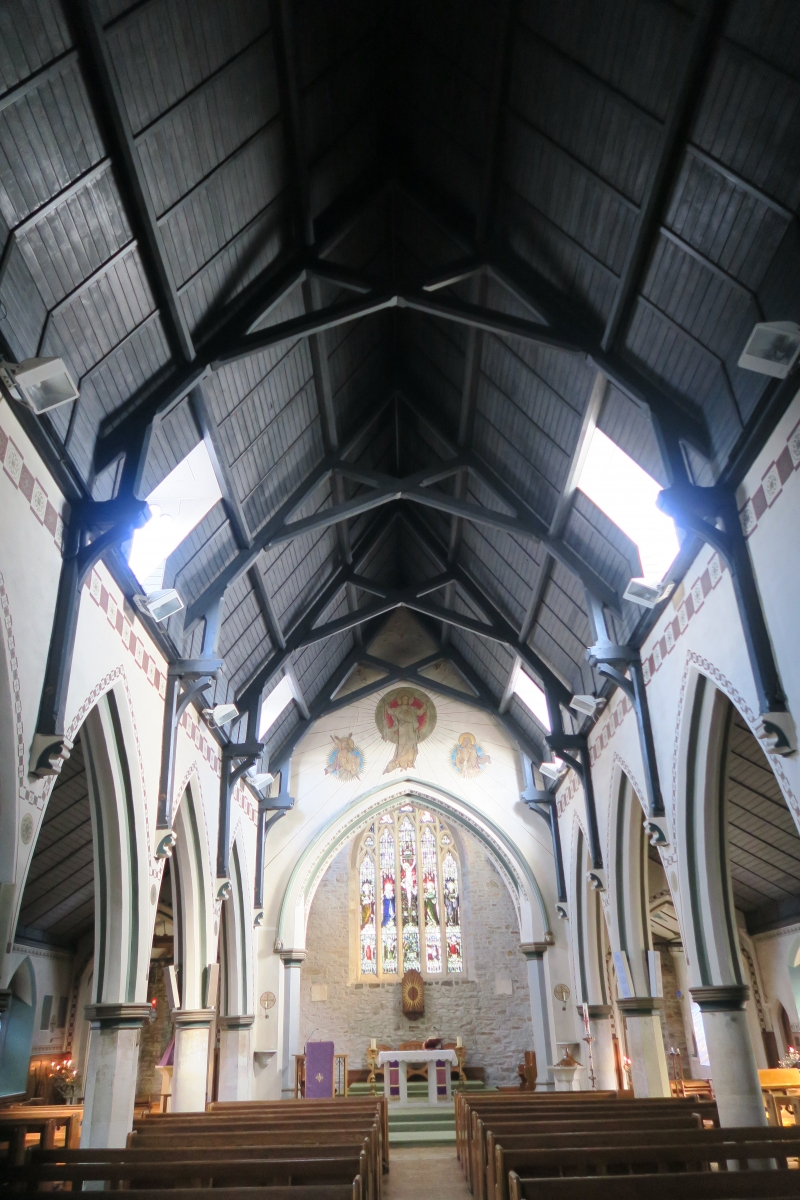
Nave

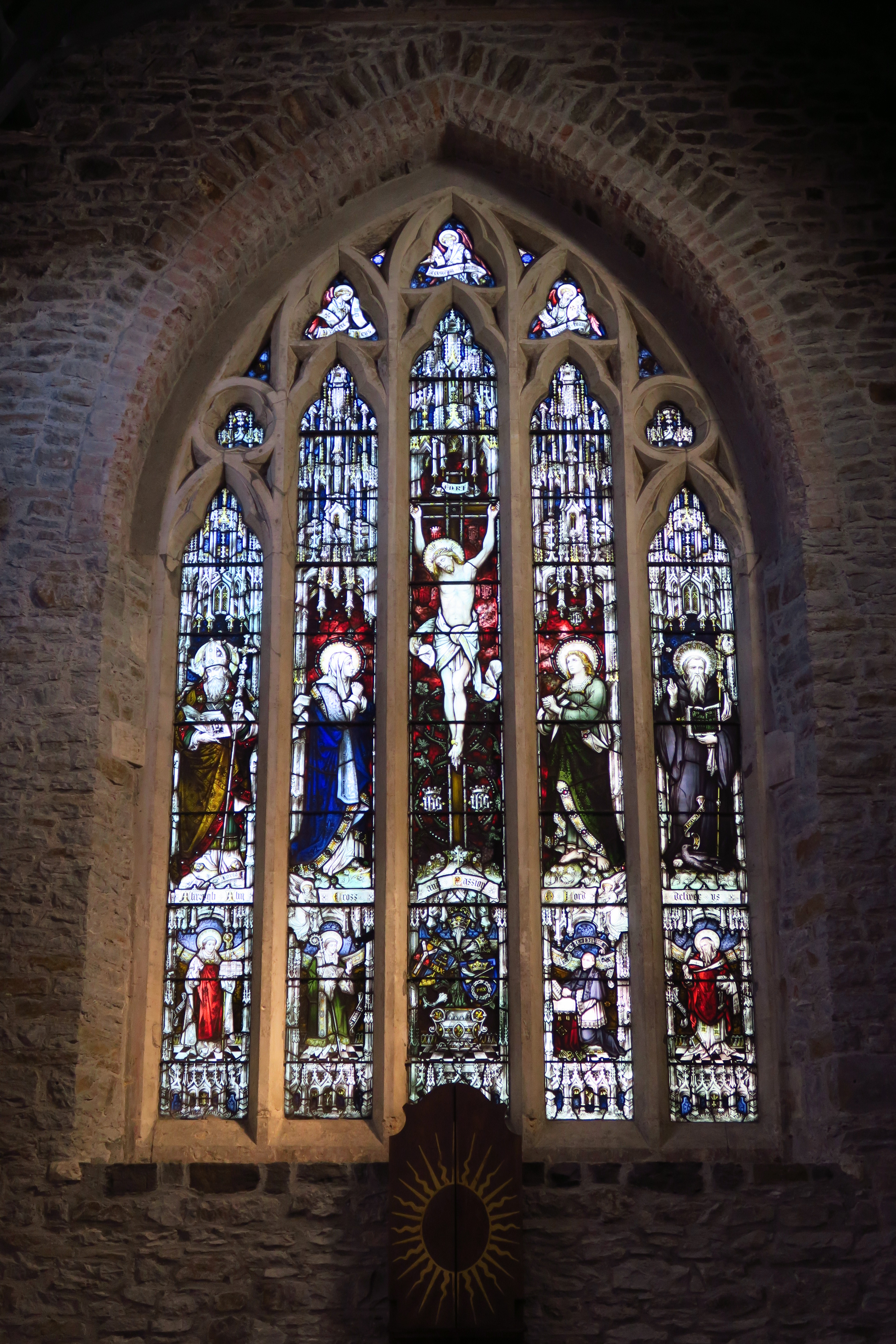
Main window

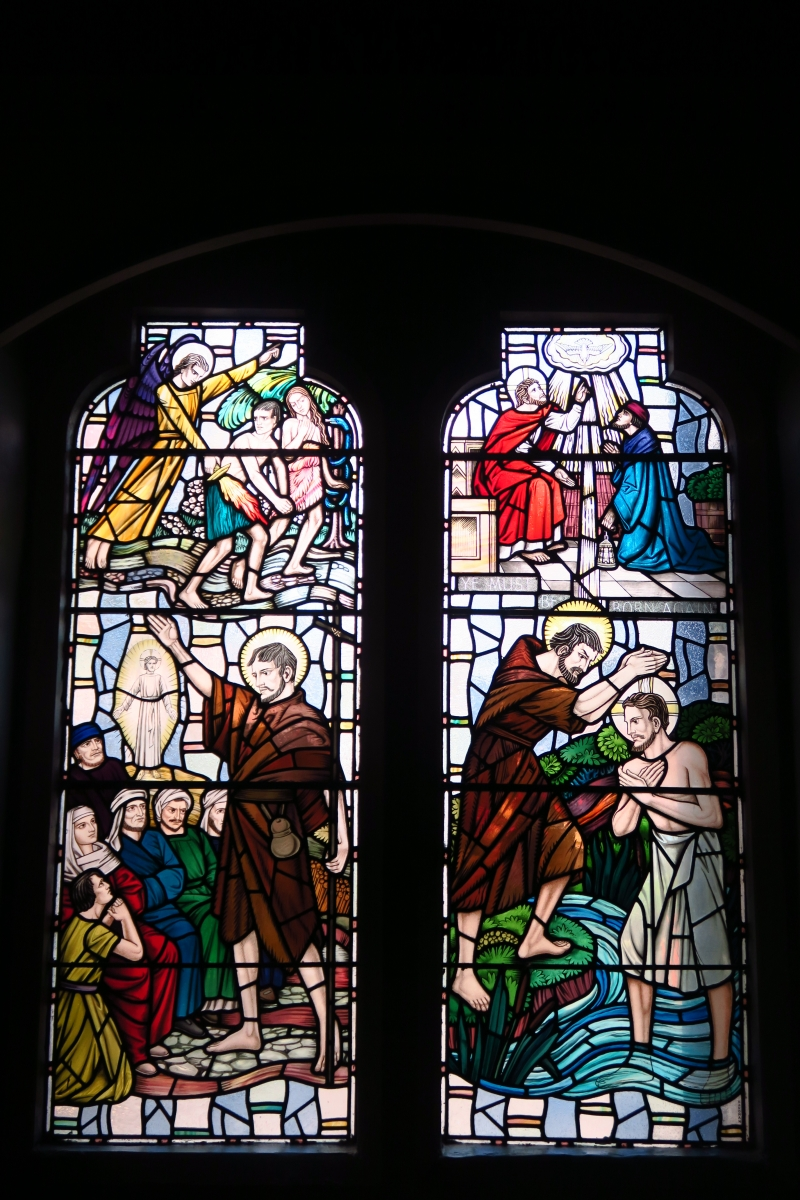
Stained glass window

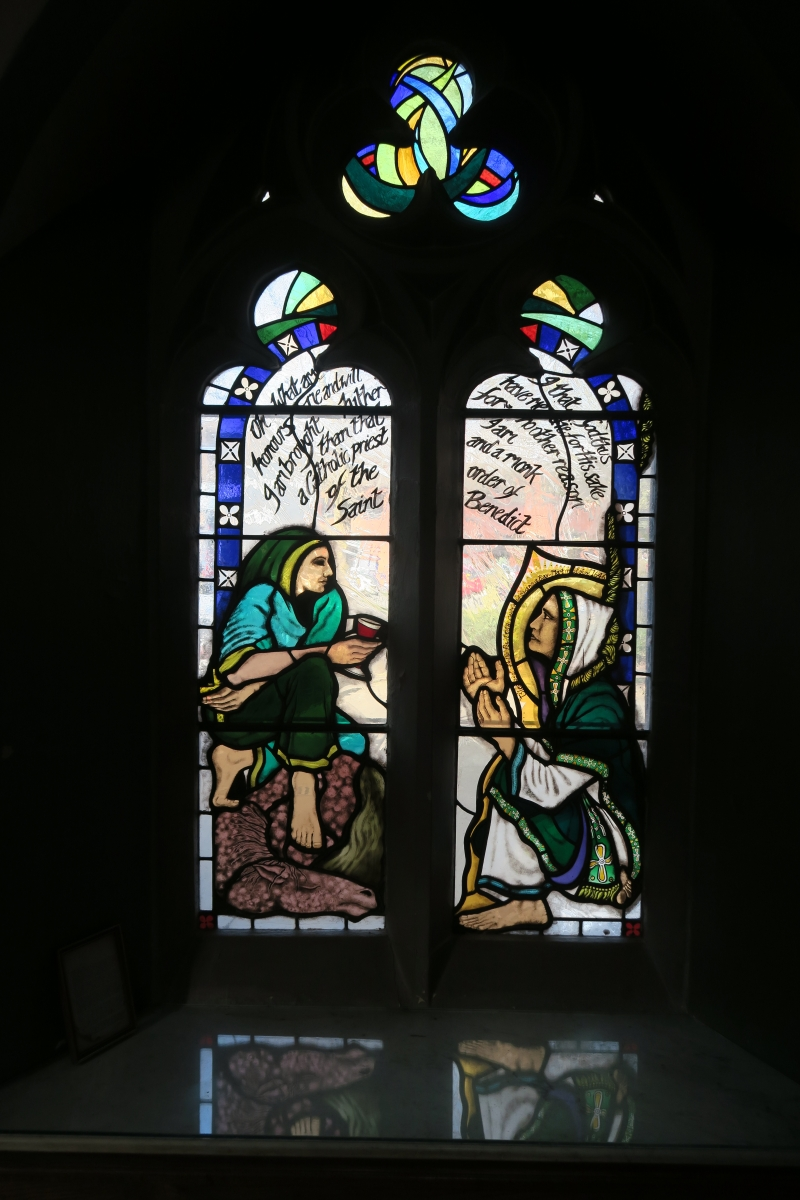
Window remembering the Benedictines

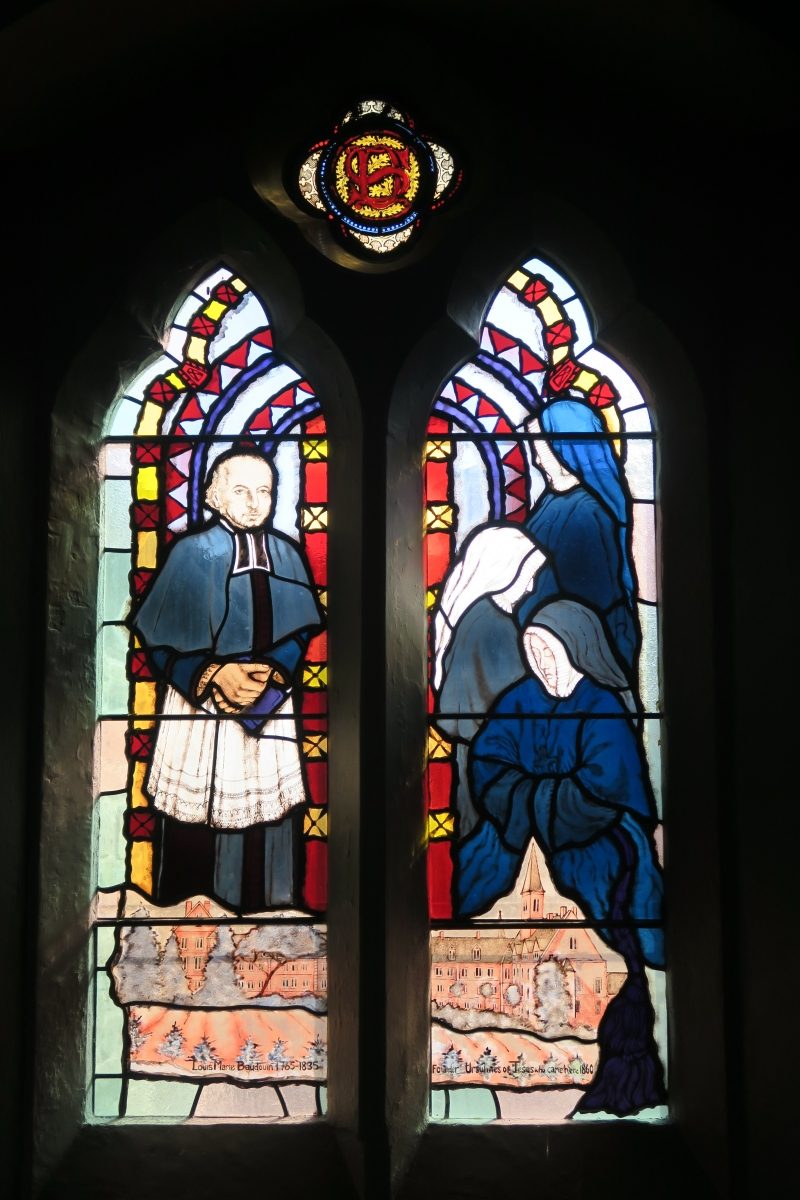
Louis-Marie Baudouin window

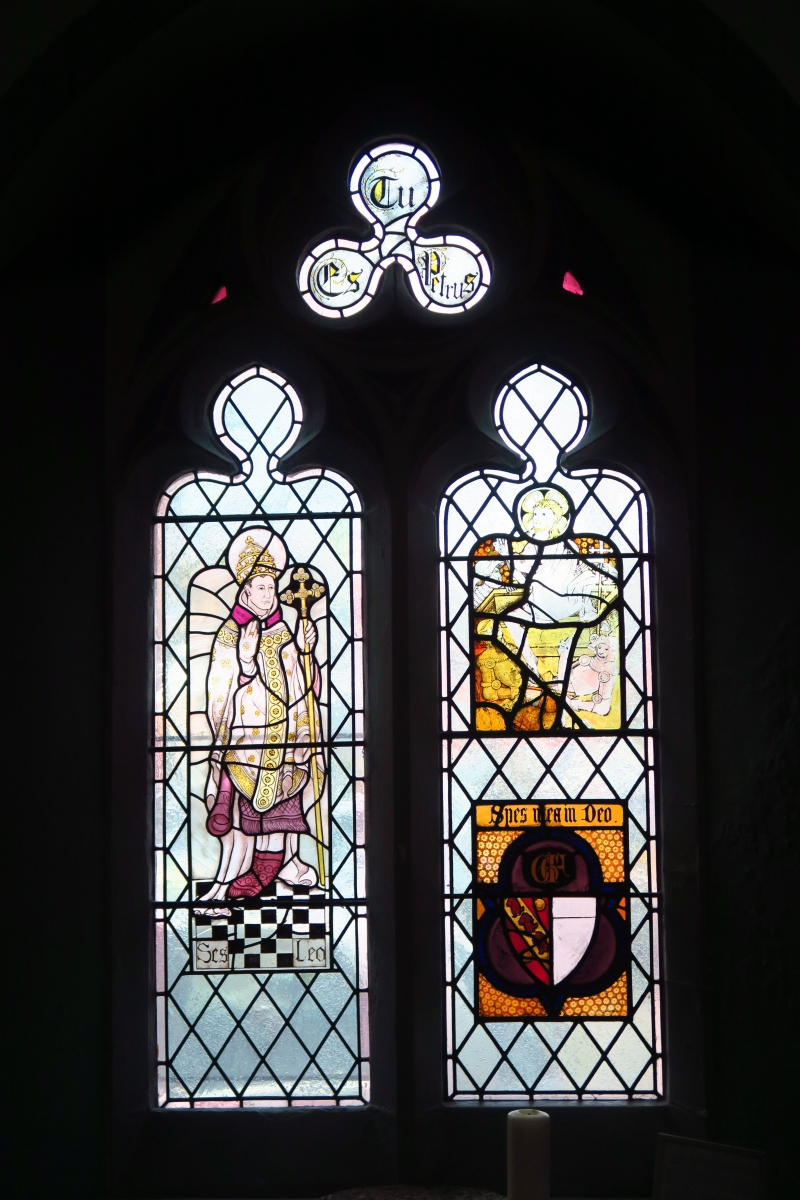
Saint Leo window

== See also ==
- Diocese of Newport and Menevia
