= Cwmbwrla (electoral ward) =

Coordinates: 51.63756°N 3.95219°W

Cwmbwrla Ward
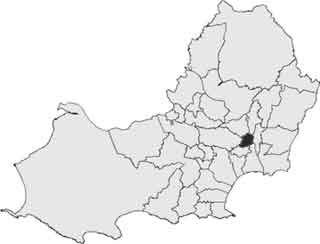
- Area: 1.50 km^{2} (0.58 sq mi)
- Population: 7,972 (2011 census)
  - Density: 5,315/km^{2} (13,770/sq mi)
- Principal area: Swansea
- Preserved county: West Glamorgan
- Country: Wales
- Sovereign state: United Kingdom
- UK Parliament: Swansea West - Torsten Bell
- Senedd Cymru – Welsh Parliament: Swansea East - Mike Hedges
- Councillors: Peter Malcolm Black (Liberal Democrats (UK)); Christopher Ashleigh Holley (Liberal Democrats (UK)); Lewis Graham Thomas (Liberal Democrats (UK))

Cwmbwrla is an electoral ward in the City and County of Swansea, Wales, including the suburb of the same name.

The electoral ward consists of some or all of the following settlements: Brondeg, Brynhyfryd, Cwmbwrla, Cwmdu, Gendros and Manselton, in the parliamentary constituency of Swansea East. The ward is bounded by the wards of Cockett to the west; Castle and Townhill to the south; Landore to the east; and Penderry and Mynydd-Bach to the north.

For the purposes of local elections, Cwmbwrla is broken down into the following polling districts: Manselton South, Cwmdu, Manselton North and Brynhyfryd. The ward returns 3 councillors to the local council. The ward is currently represented by: Peter Black (Lib Dems), Chris Holley (Lib Dems) and Graham Thomas (Lib Dems).

== 2012 local council elections ==
The results of the 2012 local council elections for Cwmbwrla were:

Candidate	Party	Votes	Status
Peter Malcolm Black	Liberal Democrats	1228	Liberal Democrats hold
Christopher Ashleigh Holley	Liberal Democrats	1045	Liberal Democrats hold
Lewis Graham Thomas	Liberal Democrats	1023	Liberal Democrats hold
Cyril Anderson	Labour	965	
Peter David Meehan	Labour	824	
Joy Richards	Labour	807	

The electorate turnout was 35%
