= A4118 road =

Road in Swansea

Coordinates: 51.5823°N 4.0922°W

A4118

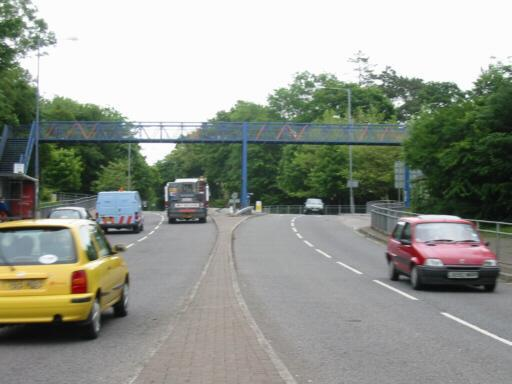

Route information
- Length: 17 mi (27 km)

Major junctions
- Southwest end: Greenhill, Swansea
- A483 A4216
- Northeast end: Port Eynon, Swansea

Location
- Country: United Kingdom
- Constituent country: Wales

Road network
- Roads in the United Kingdom; Motorways; A and B road zones
← A4117	→ A4119

The A4118 road is in Swansea, Wales, connecting Dyfatty Street in Swansea City Centre with Port Eynon in the Gower Peninsula. The route runs through suburban areas until it reaches Upper Killay, where the road enters rural Gower. It passes over Fairwood Common and through several villages before terminating at Port Eynon.

== Route ==
The A4118 starts at Dyfatty Street in Swansea city centre at the junction with the A483 Carmarthen Road, which is just north of Swansea railway station. It then goes westwards through the town centre. It passes through Mount Pleasant and Uplands before reaching Sketty, where having passed the parish church of St Pauls and Holy Trinity, it crosses the A4216.

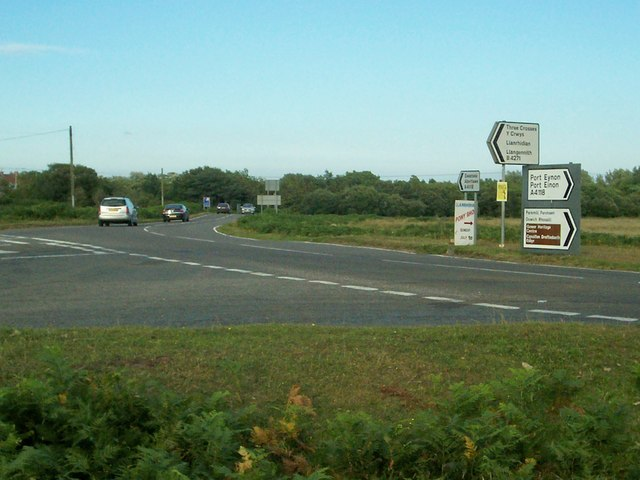
Road Junction where the A4118 meets the B4271

After passing through Killay and Upper Killay, where the B4271 branches off to the right, the A4118 turns towards the southwest and leaves the main urban area of Swansea and the scenery becomes more rural. The road crosses Fairwood Common, where Swansea Airport can be seen on the right, and after turning westward the road becomes more scenic with Pennard Castle and the links course of Pennard Golf Club visible to the left. It then passes through the villages of Parkmill, Penmaen and Knelston. Here the road swings round to the south and passes through the village of Llandewi. The B4247 to Rhossilli branches off to the right and the A4118 descends to the coast.
