= Griffith Anthony =

Musician from South Wales

Griffith Anthony (1846 – 13 June 1897) was a musician. He was born in Llanelly, Carmarthenshire, South Wales and worked at a Cwmbwrla's ironworks as a boy. He studied a form of sight-singing called tonic sol-fa and then began to teach music in churches. Among the songs, hymn tunes, and anthems that he wrote was Dyddiau dyn sydd fel glaswelltyn (Man, his days are as grass). He was with Babell Chapel of Cwmbwrla when he died 13 June 1897.
