= Greenhill, Swansea =

Area of Swansea, Wales

Coordinates: 51.6293°N 3.9413°W

Greenhill is an inner-urban district of Swansea, lying immediately north of the city centre around the junction of the A483, A4118 and B4489 roads.

The Greenhill area was the focus of large-scale Irish immigration in the second half of the 19th century – especially following the Great Famine – and from that period date the foundation of Greenhill's Roman Catholic Junior School and that of Saint Joseph's church, designed by the firm of Pugin & Pugin and consecrated in 1888, and which, from 1987, become the present-day Cathedral Church of Saint Joseph.

Greenhill contains Griffith John Street which is close to the site of the birthplace of Christian missionary to China, Griffith John.

The combined effects of slum clearance schemes, damage to housing from wartime aerial bombardment in the Swansea Blitz, and post-war road improvement measures have led to some loss of identity for this once very densely occupied part of Swansea, to the extent that many locals now identify it simply as a part of the area lying to its immediate north and known as Brynmelyn (Welsh: "yellow hill"), after Bryn-Melyn Street, which traverses it. Note that Brynmelyn should not be confused with "Brynmelin", sometimes offered as a Welsh-language translation of Brynmill, which is an entirely different district of Swansea. Among nearby places are Cwmbwrla, Hafod, Manselton, and Mayhill.
