= White City, Swansea Greyhound Track =

Former sports venue

- Location: Fforestfach, Swansea, Wales
- Coordinates: 51°38′28″N 3°59′16″W
- Opened: 1932
- Closed: 1946

White City, Swansea Greyhound Track was a greyhound racing track in Fforestfach, north-west of Swansea, Wales. It is not to be confused with the Fforestfach track on Ystrad Road that was built later and was called the Swansea Greyhound Stadium.

== History ==
The track near Pen-llwyn-eithin Farm had a grand opening on Saturday 23 April 1932, with the admission cost set at one shilling. There were 12 races with a £30 feature handicap race and plans to race every Tuesday, Thursday and Saturday. It became the second track in the Swansea area to open following the Glais Stadium, which had opened in 1928.

The track has been referenced as Pen-llwyn-eithin, Penllenddan and Penwyneiddan which is probably why it gained the nickname White City. The track was located on the east side of Pen-llwyn-eithin Farm and was west of the Crockett Rail Goods Yard Railway. Racing continued regularly over the following decade.

The track is named as Penllenddan Farm, Swansea on the 1946 betting licence lists and is shown as having a capacity of 2,500 people but the track is believed to have closed around the same time and did not appear on the 1947 lists.

The Mettoy (Toys) factory was built in 1948 and covered what was the south part of the greyhound track. The only remaining reference to the track is the nearby named White City Road.
