= Cwmdu, Swansea =

Suburban district

Coordinates: 51°38′14.00″N 3°57′39.00″W

Cwmdu is a suburban district of the City and County of Swansea, Wales. The western part falls within the Cockett ward and the eastern part falls within the Cwmbwrla ward. Cwmdu approximates to the settlement around Middle Road between Cwmbwrla and Gendros. The neighboring districts are Gendros, Townhill and Cockett.
