= Ernest Morgan (architect) =

Welsh architect and painter (1881–1954)

Ernest Morgan (1881 – 10 August 1954) was a Welsh architect and painter.

As the borough architect of Swansea, buildings he designed include:

- Mayhill School
- Swansea Technical College extension, c.1910 (the Technical College became the Mount Pleasant campus of Swansea Metropolitan University)
- Swansea Central Police Station, 1912-13
- Townhill residential district, 1920– (Morgan oversaw the Garden City layout)
