= Swansea Greyhound Stadium =

Greyhound racing track near Swansea, Wales

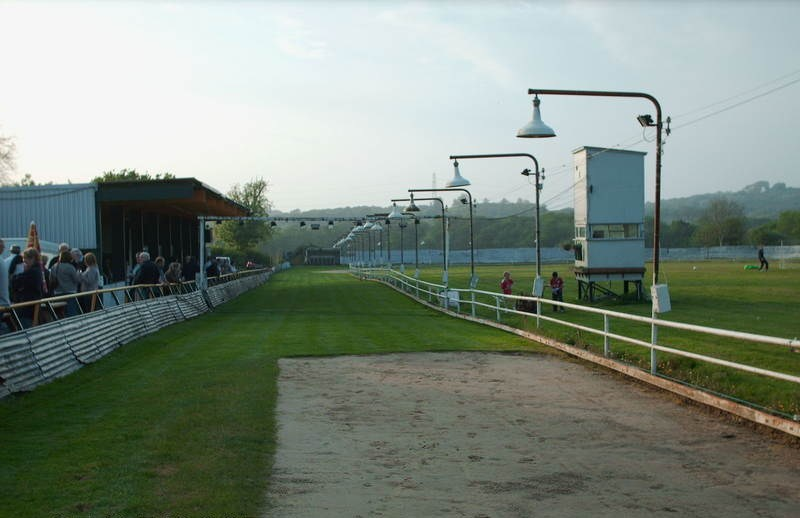
- Swansea Stadium
- Interactive map of Swansea Greyhound Stadium
- Location: Ystrad Road, Fforestfach, Swansea, Wales
- Coordinates: 51°38′28″N 3°59′16″W

Construction
- Opened: 1947
- Closed: 2009

Swansea Greyhound Stadium was a greyhound racing track on Ystrad Road in Fforestfach, north-west of Swansea, Wales. It is not to be confused with the Fforestfach track called White City that was built earlier and had closed before World War II.

== History ==
The stadium was situated on the north side of Ystrad Road opposite three factories (clothing, sprinklers and electrical components). On the northern edge of the greyhound stadium was a racecourse with a football ground inside the centre of it. It is unclear if it was ever used for horse racing.

On 6 March 1947, the Swansea Highways Committee held a meeting to discuss a proposal for a new greyhound racing track. Trails commenced on 6 June and the grand opening took place on Saturday 14 June 1947 with two race meeting at 2.45pm and 7.00pm.

The greyhound stadium also hosted grass track speedway and had a large circumference of 484 metres with distances of 312, 430 and 525 yards. Races included the Swansea Derby. The stadium remained independent (unaffiliated with a governing body) and raced on Tuesday and Saturday evenings.

It closed on 7 November 2009 following the non compliance of an improvement notice, issued after Swansea county council enforcement officers found kennels in poor repair and wheelbarrows of excrement. The stadium was demolished and the site opposite the Ystrad Trade Park remains empty.

The land has been rented/leased by the council to a waste recycling company. The land is currently undergoing preparation work.
