= Townhill (electoral ward) =

Coordinates: 51.62833°N 3.96624°W

Townhill Ward
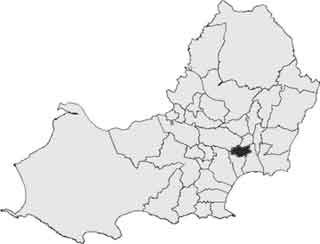
- Area: 1.8 km^{2} (0.69 sq mi)
- Population: 8,696 (2011 census)
  - Density: 4,831/km^{2} (12,510/sq mi)
- Principal area: Swansea
- Preserved county: West Glamorgan
- Country: Wales
- Sovereign state: United Kingdom
- UK Parliament: Swansea West
- Senedd Cymru – Welsh Parliament: Gŵyr Abertawe
- Councillors: David Henry Hopkins (Labour); Nicholas Stuart Bradley (Labour); William Edwin Alan Jones (Labour)

Townhill is an electoral ward of Swansea, Wales, UK. It is named after the Townhill area of Swansea.

The electoral ward consists of some or all of the following geographical areas: Cwm-Gwyn, Mayhill, and Townhill in the parliamentary constituency of Swansea West. The ward is bounded by the wards of Cockett and Cwmbwrla to the north; Castle to the east; and the Uplands to the south.

For electoral purposes the local council divides Townhill into a number of polling districts, which are: Pryderi, Dyfed Avenue, Gwynedd Avenue, Gors Avenue, Mayhill North and Mayhill South. The ward returns three councillors who are Geoffrey Burtonshaw, David Hopkins and Billy Jones, all of whom represent the Labour Party.

== 2008 local council elections ==
For the 2008 local council elections, the turnout for Townhill was 27%. The election results were:

Candidate	Party	Votes	Status
David Henry Hopkins	Labour	772	Labour hold
Nicholas Stuart Bradley	Labour	749	Labour hold
William Edwin Alan Jones	Labour	682	Labour hold
Jacqueline Church	Liberal Democrats	382	
James Sheridan	Liberal Democrats	375	
Terence Porter	Independents	330	
Thomas Caldas	Liberal Democrats	284	
Hazel Pouline McKnight	Plaid Cymru	235	
Susan Rosemary Sturgess	Independents	183	
Simon David Clason Bevan	Conservatives	119	
Vincent Bishop	Conservatives	109	
Dayne Ryan Powell	Conservatives	91	

== Districts ==
=== Townhill ===
The district of Townhill is spread over a steep hill of the same name bordering Mayhill and visible from the Swansea city centre. The area overlooks Swansea City Centre, the docklands and Swansea Bay.

=== Mayhill ===
The district of Mayhill is spread over the top of a steep hill just north west of the city centre.
