= Jessie Donaldson =

Welsh teacher and anti-slavery abolitionist (1799 - 1899)

Jessie Donaldson (née Heineken) (18 February 1799 - September 1889) was a Welsh teacher and anti-slavery abolitionist. For a time she operated a safe-house for the protection of slaves fleeing north on the Ohio River.

== Early life ==
Jessie Heineken was born on 18 February 1799 and baptised on 11 April at the Old Meeting Swan Yard-Presbyterian, Ware, Hertford. She was the daughter of Jannet (dates unknown) and her cousin Samuel Heineken (1768–1856) a lawyer practising in Hackney, London. Samuel Heineken later practised in Bristol before moving with his family to Dynevor Place, Swansea.

Opposition to the slave trade was strong in Wales and Swansea had one of the largest and most active abolitionist campaigns in Wales. Jessie's family were active abolitionists. In 1822 her Aunt, Anna Margaretta emigrated to Cincinnati with her husband Francis Donaldson Sr. There they created a home on the bank of the Ohio River, called Frandon (short for Francis Donaldson) which became a safe house on the ‘Underground Railroad, helping to hide slaves fleeing the slave state of Kentucky into the freedom of Cincinnati.

Meanwhile, Jessie Donaldson in her early twenties, set up a school in Wind Street, Swansea.

== Marriage and emigration ==
In 1840, aged 41, Jessie married her cousin Francis Donaldson Jr. the eldest son of her aunt Anna Margaretta. They married at Bettws Church, Carmarthenshire on 7 July with Donaldson described as ‘of Frandon, Ohio.' They set up home in a three-storey terrace at 9 Grove Place, Swansea where they lived for 16 years.

In 1854 Jessie and her husband, now in their 50's, emigrated to America. They purchased 251 acres of land in Clermont County, Cincinnati near to where her Aunt Anna Margaretta had lived. There they set up their own safe house called Clermont. This occurred at a time when the authorities were threatening those offering shelter and protection for slaves with huge fines and prison sentences.

During her time in Ohio, Donaldson became acquainted with many abolitionist leaders, such as freed slaves Frederick Douglass, Ellen and William Craft; campaigner William Lloyd Garrison; and Harriet Beecher Stowe, author of Uncle Tom's Cabin (1852). Douglass and the Crafts did later appear at Swansea to give lectures and it's possible that Donaldson may have provided letters of introduction.

== Return to Swansea ==
The 1861 census records Donaldson back in Swansea with her husband, who is described as an American Landed Proprietor, and her sister Mary Ann. It is not known why they returned, but in 1865 the United States abolished slavery and most biographies on Donaldson have them returning home in 1866. So they may have only been visiting Wales in 1861.

Her husband Francis died in March 1873, aged 78.

== Death and legacy ==
Donaldson died in September 1889 aged 91.

In 2020, largely thanks to the research of Swansea historian Jen Wilson, Donaldson's life was rediscovered. In 2021 a Blue Plaque was erected in her honor on the University of Wales Trinity Saint David's (UWTSD) Dynevor Building near her first home.

In Cincinnati, the National Underground Railroad Freedom Center tells the stories of plantation life, and the slaves who helped build America. Donaldson and her Aunt Anna Margaretta's stories are part of the archives. Additional research materials relating to Donaldson are also held at the National Library of Wales.
