= Birchgrove, Swansea =

Birchgrove: Welsh: Y Gellifedw
- Suburb
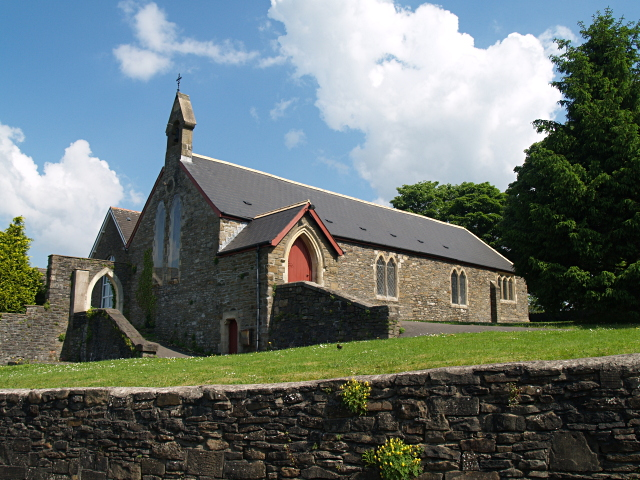
- Glais Church

- Location within Swansea
- Population: 7,392 (2011)
- OS grid reference: SS704981
- Community: Birchgrove
- Principal area: Swansea
- Country: Wales
- Sovereign state: United Kingdom
- Post town: SWANSEA
- Postcode district: SA7
- Dialling code: 01792
- Police: South Wales
- Fire: Mid and West Wales
- Ambulance: Welsh
- UK Parliament: Swansea East
- Senedd Cymru – Welsh Parliament: Swansea East
- List of places UK Wales Swansea 51.67°N 3.88°W Map of the community

Birchgrove (Welsh: Y Gellifedw) is a suburb and community in Swansea, Wales, United Kingdom. It is situated about 4.5 miles (7 km) north-east of Swansea city centre, between the flood plain of the River Tawe and Mynydd Drumau (Drummau Mountain). The community of Birchgrove had a population of 7,392 in 2011.

== Locality ==
Long vistas of the Swansea, Neath and Blaengwynfi valleys are to be had from the top of Mynydd Drumau, as well as a clear view of the Devon coast across the Bristol Channel.

== Education ==
Birchgrove has a primary and a comprehensive secondary school, both of which are state-run, mixed, and non-denominational.

Birchgrove Comprehensive School was opened in 1991 in the grounds of the old junior school. It serves the areas of Birchgrove, Glais, and Clydach. Most of the pupils attending Birchgrove Primary School move on to Birchgrove Comprehensive at age 11. However, many pupils from Glais and Clydach attend Cwmtawe Community School in nearby Pontardawe, while a number of pupils from Llansamlet and Trallwn attend Birchgrove instead of Cefn Hengoed Community School in Winch Wen.

== History ==
=== Prehistory ===
The countryside surrounding Birchgrove is scattered with prehistoric sites. There are numerous barrow mounds and evidence of prehistoric dwellings.

Carreg Bica is a large standing stone on Drummau Mountain. The stone is local sandstone and is around 13 ft high. The name means "pointed stone" in the Welsh language. The stone is also known by other names: Maen Bredwan or Maen Bradwen. It is also mentioned in a charter to King John to William de Breos in 1203 as "meynhirion", as a boundary stone marking the Gower.

There is a legend of the stone moving and going to a local stream to drink or bathe. In this case the stone is said to bathe in the river Neath once a year on Easter morning. Children from Skewen were said to race to the stone on Easter morning.

Cistercian monks built the nearby Neath Abbey in the early 12th century. Wintering their flocks and herds in the few open spaces down in the valley, during the other seasons keeping them in their specially constructed stone walled fields on Drummau mountain top, using the standing stone as a landmark. Many sections of the stone walls are still standing from Cistercian times.

=== Industrial era ===
From an early date to the beginning of the 19th century, coal-mining played an important role in Birchgrove. It was mainly on coal-mining that the villages of the parish grew, and Birchgrove was no exception. Mining played a very important role in the industrial development of the lower Swansea Valley, which was becoming the metallurgical centre of the world. (See History of Swansea.) Coal was replacing wood in the smelting of ores; and it was because of the demand for coal that a pit was sunk in Birchgrove, known as Birchgrove Colliery Company, locally known as the 'Old Pit'. It was situated just below the Birchgrove Post Office. It was sunk in 1845, to a depth of approximately 100 feet. As a result of its prosperity, two further pits were sunk, namely Sisters Pit, and Brothers Pit. Approximately 200 worked at the Old Pit. This involved many new people coming into the area, to work in both mining and the copper industry. The only cultural recreation was a Reading Room, situated near the colliery. It was not used on Sundays, so the people of the village were given permission to use it for Sunday worship. Services were held there according to the Book of Common Prayer of the Church of England (the Church in Wales not being founded until 1920). The services held there were well supported. The Birchgrove Colliery was closed in 1931. There are still relics of Birchgrove's industrial past in the area, The ruins of Scot's pit pump house dominate the lower end of Birchgrove and evidence of mine workings can still be found.

== Nearest places ==
- Llansamlet
- Swansea Vale
- Glais
- Skewen

== Bibliography ==
- Davies, John; Jenkins, Nigel (2008). The Welsh Academy Encyclopaedia of Wales. Cardiff: University of Wales Press. ISBN 978-0-7083-1953-6.
