= A4216 road =

Road in Wales

Coordinates: 51.62667°N 3.98106°W

A4216

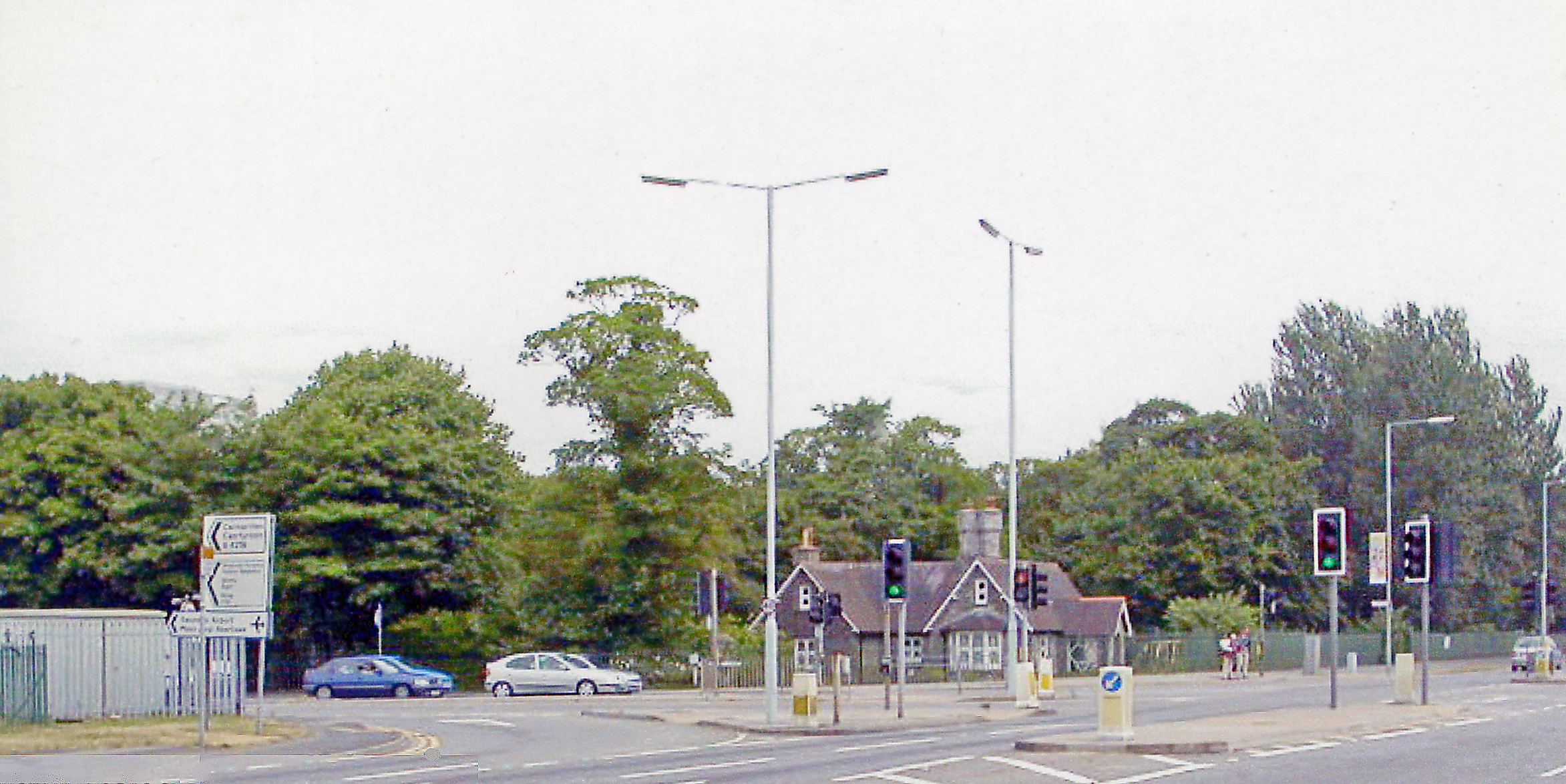
- View NW, off the A4067 Mumbles Road at the A4216 Sketty Lane.

Major junctions
- North end: A483 (Carmarthen Road)
- A4067 A4118 A483
- South end: A4067 (Mumbles Road)

Location
- Country: United Kingdom
- Constituent country: Wales

Road network
- Roads in the United Kingdom; Motorways; A and B road zones
← A4215	→ A4217

The A4216 is a main road in Swansea, Wales.

== Route ==
The road links Sketty with Gendros. It begins at the junction at the bottom of Sketty Lane with Mumbles Road. It continues up Sketty Lane, onto Sketty Park Road then bears right onto Dillwyn Road to the junction with the A4118 (Gower Road) at Sketty Cross. It continues through this road then up Vivian Road past Tycoch. The A4216 then continues along Cockett Road past Cwm Gwyn and through Cockett. The final stretch of the A4216 is Station Road where the A4216 forms a cross roads with the A483 (Carmarthen Road).

=== Dual carriageway ===
The only dual carriageway section is along Sketty Lane.
