= A5268 road =

Road in England

A5268

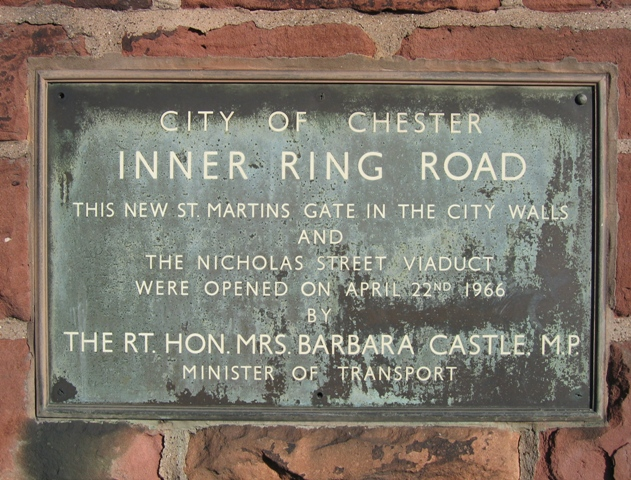
- The new opening in the City Walls created for the A5268

Route information
- Length: 1.9 mi (3.1 km)
- Existed: 1966–present

Major junctions
- Orbital around Chester
- A540; A56; A51 A483 A548

Location
- Country: United Kingdom

Road network
- Roads in the United Kingdom; Motorways; A and B road zones

The A5268 is Chester's Inner Ring Road. The road, which was built to dual carriageway standard, has roundabouts and traffic lights. Its purpose was to enable the pedestrianisation of Chester.

== Construction ==
Work involved demolishing a large tract of properties through Nicholas Street and Watergate Street and building a flyover across the North Wales Mainline railway. A new opening also had to be constructed through Chester's city walls. In 1966 St Martin's Gate was opened by Minister of Transport, Barbara Castle. The whole inner ring road project was completed by 1972.

== History ==
It was constructed in the 1960s to divert traffic from through the city centre. The through-traffic function of the road was superseded in 1976 by the construction of Chester's southerly by-pass.
