= St David Awards =

Annual award for Welsh citizens

Saint David Awards/Gwobrau Dewi Sant
- Awarded for: Exceptional achievements
- Country: Wales
- Presented by: Welsh Government
- First award: 13 March 2014
- Website: https://www.gov.wales/st-david-awards

Carwyn Jones, First Minister of Wales, presents the winners of the 2015 St David Awards

Gareth Bale at the 2016 St David Awards

The Saint David Awards (Welsh: Gwobrau Dewi Sant) are an annual government awards scheme which recognizes exceptional achievements by Welsh citizens within Wales, the UK and globally. They are the highest accolades that the Welsh Government confers on its civilians.

Previous winners include Cerys Matthews, Michael Sheen, Tanni Grey-Thompson, and Bryn Terfel.

== History ==
On the 27 February 2013 the Welsh Conservatives opened a debate surrounding Welsh Cultural Identity in the Senedd, proposing that Wales should introduce a Welsh specific Honours System. Following a Senedd debate, Carwyn Jones announced that the St David Awards would be established, with the first event to be held in 2014. It was later announced that the awards would be held in the Royal Welsh College of Music & Drama and broadcast by S4C.

== Aims and categories ==
The 2017 St David Awards

The Awards aim to "reflect and promote the aspirations of Wales and its citizens to be a modern, vibrant country, with a growing reputation as a confident and clever nation valuing innovation, community spirit, and above all its people".

Currently, there are nine award categories:

- Bravery
- Citizenship
- Culture
- Enterprise
- Innovation & Technology
- International
- Sport
- Young Person Award
- First Ministers Special Award

== Selection process ==
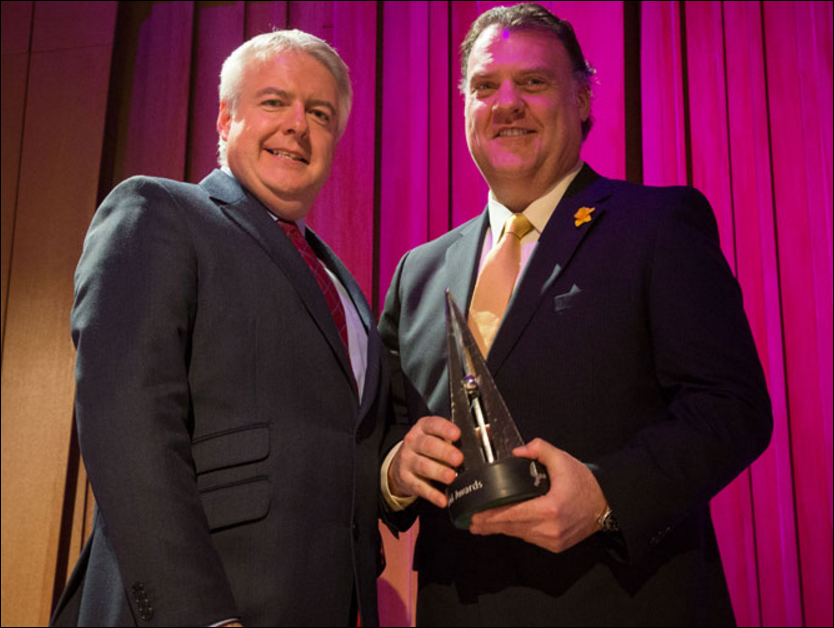
First Minister Carwyn Jones presenting Bryn Terfel with his award.

The Welsh public are invited to nominate candidates, from which a shortlist of three finalists in each category is selected by a specially commissioned advisory committee. The award winners are decided by the First Minister.

The process was criticised by the Welsh Conservatives and Welsh Liberal Democrats in 2021, after two Welsh Labour candidates were shortlisted. There were concerns from both parties that Mark Drakeford would favour nominees from his own party.

== Award winners ==
=== 2014 ===
- Bravery: Karin Williams
- Citizenship: Yaina Samuels
- Culture: Cerys Matthews
- Enterprise: Robin Jones
- Innovation & Technology: Lyn Evans
- International: Bryn Terfel
- Sport: Tanni Grey-Thompson
- Young Person Award: Jade Jones
- First Ministers Special Award: The Community of Machynlleth

=== 2015 ===
- Bravery: Derek Pusey, Leonard Walters and Clive Williams
- Citizenship: Rhian Burke
- Culture: Siân Phillips
- Enterprise: Mario Kreft
- Innovation & Technology: Peter Brewin and William Crawford
- International: Michael Sheen
- Sport: Geraint Thomas
- Young Person Award: Richard Davies
- First Ministers Special Award: NATO Newport 2014

=== 2016 ===
- Bravery: Peter Fuller
- Citizenship: Janet Williams
- Culture: Owen Sheers
- Enterprise: Dominic Griffiths
- Innovation & Technology: Geraint Davies
- International: Julie Gardner
- Sport: Chris Coleman
- Young Person Award: Carwyn Williams
- First Ministers Special Award: Nigel Owens

=== 2017 ===
- Bravery: Billy Connor and Gary Slack
- Citizenship: Cairn Newton-Evans
- Culture: Jen Wilson
- Enterprise: David Banner
- Innovation & Technology: Meena Upadhyaya
- International: David Nott
- Sport: Wales national football team
- Young Person Award: Savannah Lloyd
- First Ministers Special Award: Karl Jenkins and Mererid Hopwood

=== 2018 ===
- Bravery: Laura Matthews
- Citizenship: Mair Elliott
- Culture: David Pountney
- Enterprise: William Watkins, Radnor Hills
- Innovation & Technology: IQE
- International: The Phoenix Project
- Sport: Aled Siôn Davies
- Young Person Award: Jasmine Williams
- First Ministers Special Award: Gerald Williams

=== 2019 ===
- Bravery: Andrew Niinemae
- Citizenship: Cardiff Street Pastors
- Culture: Hijinx Theatre Company
- Enterprise: Hilltop Honey
- Innovation & Technology: Cerebra Innovation Centre
- International: Liam Rahman
- Sport: Geraint Thomas
- Young Person Award: Bethan Owen
- First Ministers Special Award: Deian Hopkin

=== 2020 ===
- Bravery: Joel Snarr and Daniel Nicholson
- Community spirit: Wasem Said
- Culture: Russell T Davies
- Business: Moneypenny
- Innovation & Technology: David Worsley
- Humanitarian: Rachel Williams
- Sport: Alun Wyn Jones
- Young Person Award: Tyler Ford
- First Ministers Special Award: Gareth Thomas

=== 2021 ===
- Bravery: John Rees, Lisa Way and Ayette Bounouri
- Community spirit: Denbighshire Dial a Ride
- Critical worker: Cherry Tree Care Home
- Business: Little Inspirations
- Innovation, Science & Technology: SBRI/ Welsh Ambulance Service Trust
- Humanitarian: John Puzey
- Culture and sport: Delwyn Derrick
- Young Person Award: Molly Fenton – Love Your Period campaign
- First Ministers Special Award: Keshav Singhal

=== 2022 ===
- Bravery: Thomas Scourfield and Geraint Jenkins
- Community spirit: Siop Griffiths
- Critical (key) worker: Michelle Jones and Catherine Cooper
- Culture: Berwyn Rowlands
- Environment champion: Low Carbon Built Environment Group (Cardiff University)
- Business: Jordan Lea
- Innovation, Science & Technology: Luca Pagano, Graham Howe, Peter Charlton, John Hughes and Richard Morgan
- Sport: Hannah Mills
- Young Person Award: Daniel Lewis
- First Ministers Special Award: Urdd Gobaith Cymru

=== 2023 ===
- Bravery: Dylan Pritchard Evans and Hari Thomas
- Community spirit: South Wales Sponsorship for Ukraine
- Critical worker (key worker): The Harm Reduction Team at Huggard
- Culture: Unify project
- Environment champion: Andy Rowland
- Business: Câr y Môr
- Innovation, Science & Technology: CanSense
- Sport: Olivia Breen
- Young Person Award: Skye Neville
- First Ministers Special Award: Gillian Clarke

=== 2024 ===
- Bravery: Callum Smith
- Community spirit: Helen Hughes
- Critical worker (key worker): Therapy and Recovery Team at Brynawel Rehab
- Culture: Aloud Charity
- Environment champion: Fare Share Cymru
- Business: Case-UK Ltd
- Innovation, Science & Technology: Concrete Canvas
- Sport: Cheryl Foster
- Young Person Award: Lia Ellis Thomas
- First Ministers Special Award: Alan Bates (subpostmaster)

=== 2025 ===
- Bravery: Justin Biggs
- Community Champion: Paul Bromwell
- Public Services: Patrick Watts
- Culture: David Hurn
- Environment champion: Peter Stanley
- Business: Bad Wolf Ltd
- Innovation, Science & Technology: ImmunoServ
- Sport: Emma Finucane
- Volunteering: Llanberis Mountain Rescue Team
- Young Person Award: Dylan Buller
- First Ministers Special Award: Ruth Jones

=== 2026 ===
- Bravery: Liz Hopkin, Darrel Campbell, Fiona Elias
- Community Champion: Parent Learning Group
- Public Services: Tipswalo Day
- Culture: Max Boyce
- Environment champion: Cynrig Hatchery
- Business: de Novo Solutions
- Innovation, Science & Technology: Joanne Davies
- Sport: Jess Fishlock
- Volunteering: Brian Jones
- Young Person Award: Cian Evans
- First Ministers Special Award: Henry Engelhardt and Diane Briere de l’Isle Engelhardt

== See also ==
- Welsh Government
- List of Wales-related topics
- The UK Honours System
