= Berwyn Rowlands =

Welsh producer

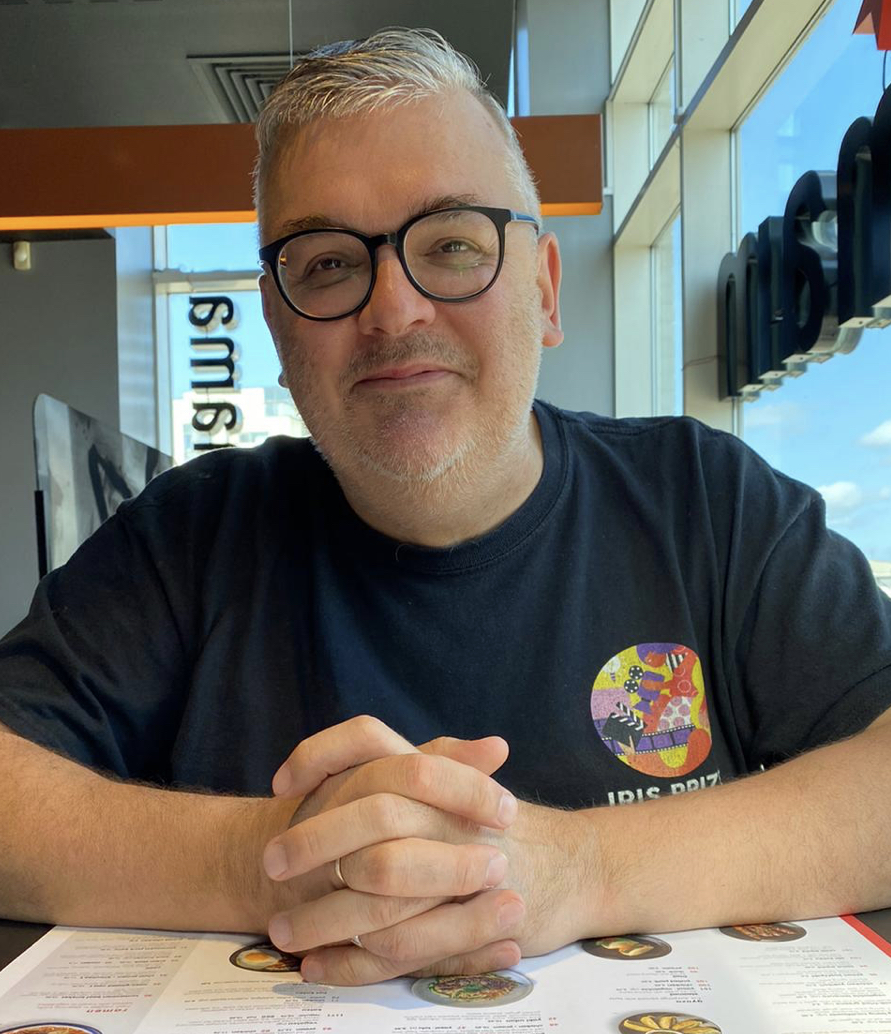
- Portrait of Berwyn Rowlands in 2020
- Born: John Berwyn Rowlands; 1966 (age 59–60); Llangoed, Anglesey
- Education: Ysgol David Hughes
- Occupations: Media and film executive
- Known for: Founder of the Iris Prize
- Partner: Grant Vidgen
- Awards: St David Awards for Culture (2022)

John Berwyn Rowlands (born 1966) is a Welsh creative producer who founded and continues to lead the Iris Prize LGBT+ Film Festival. Previously he was chief executive of Sgrîn, Media Agency of Wales from 1997 to 2006 and director of the Welsh International Film Festival from 1989 to 1997.

== Early life ==
Rowland grew up in Llangoed, Anglesey, in "a passionate Welsh-speaking, working-class family". In 1978 Rowlands was the youngest person to establish a local group (Aelwyd) of the Welsh youth voluntary organisation Urdd Gobaith Cymru. Aelwyd Llangoed met in the primary school until 1983. While a pupil at Ysgol David Hughes, Rowlands also established the school magazine San.

== Career ==
Rowlands moved to Aberystwyth in 1986. While in Aberystwyth he established the theatre-in-education company Cwmni Cadwyn, which toured his play Dwirnod Olaf Elfyd Wyn Roberts 17 Blwyddyn Oed, commissioned by British Institute for Traffic Education Research (BITER). Rowlands then joined Ffilmiau Rebeca as a researcher on the Welsh language television programme Tudalen 88.

Rowlands established the Aberystwyth-based company Premiere Cymru Wales in 1990 with the then director of Aberystwyth Arts Centre Alan Hewson. Premiere produced the Welsh International Film Festival from 1990 to 1998. In 1995 Rowlands produced the feature length drama for S4C Llety Piod starring Bill Nighy and Sandra Dickinson.

Premiere published a number of magazines including Ffocws, a bi-monthly bilingual magazine for the Welsh media industry, from 1994 until 1998.

Rowlands was appointed as the chief executive of Sgrîn, the Media Agency for Wales in April 1997. During his tenure Sgrîn co-ordinated the establishment of a pan-Wales film location service, Wales Screen Commission and the National Screen & Sound Archive in partnership with the National Library of Wales.

In 2006 Rowlands left Sgrîn and established The Festivals Company. Through this company he set up the Iris Prize, an international competition for LGBT+ short films awarded annually in Cardiff.

== Personal ==
An out gay man, Rowlands has been active with campaigning groups including Cylch – the Welsh language lesbian and gay society founded in Aberystwyth in 1990. He entered into a civil partnership with his long-term partner Grant Vidgen on Dydd Santes Dwynwen 2006 (25 Jan) and in 2012 the couple were the first same-sex couple to compete on the Welsh language game show Siôn a Siân. From Anglesey originally, Rowlands now lives in Cardiff.

In 2020 Rowlands was nominated for outstanding contribution to LGBT life in the 2020 British LGBT Awards.

He has been recognised as an influential LGBT+ person in Wales, earning a place on the Western Mail’s Pinc List each year since the list was first published in 2015.

Also in 2015, Rowlands was listed in the Wales Arts Powerlist as one of fifty people making a mark on Welsh culture due to the success of the Iris Prize.

Rowlands was presented with a St David Awards award for Culture by the First Minister of Wales in 2022 recognising his work with the Iris Prize. In 2023, he was awarded an honorary fellowship by University of Wales Trinity Saint David.

In 2024 Rowlands was identified as one of seven Arts & Film Game Changers who have used National Lottery funding to create, develop and do brilliant things.
