= Libanus =

Libanus may refer to:

- Mount Lebanon, also known as the Lebanon Mountains, the ancient name for which was Libanus
- Libanus, Powys, a village in the Brecon Beacons National Park, in the county of Powys, Wales, United Kingdom
- Libanus (mythology), a character in Greek mythology

== See also ==
- Libanus Chapel (disambiguation)
