= Cwmbwrla =

Coordinates: 51°38′13.00″N 3°57′28.00″W

- Community
- Principal area: Swansea
- Country: Wales
- Sovereign state: United Kingdom
- Police: South Wales
- Fire: Mid and West Wales
- Ambulance: Welsh
- List of places UK Wales Swansea Map of the community

Cwmbwrla (Welsh for 'Bwrla valley') is a residential area and community of Swansea in Wales, within the Cwmbwrla ward of the city. Located on rising ground about 1 mile (1.6 km) north of the city centre, it takes its name from the valley of the Burlais Brook (now culverted) which flows down from here to join the River Tawe immediately northeast of Swansea railway station. The neighbouring districts are Manselton, Greenhill, Mayhill, Townhill, and Cwmdu.

The population of the community and ward was 7,972 in 2011.

== Local Housing and Amenities ==
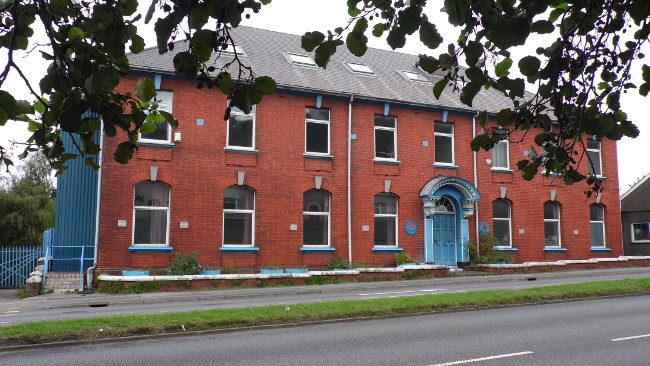
FOYD Centre, Cwmbwrla, Swansea

Cwmbwrla is a predominantly residential area with just a few local convenience stores. Local amenities include Burlais Primary School, CREST- a day centre for mental health services, FOYD - Friends of the Young Disabled buildings (previously head offices of Cwmfelin Steel), a Work-Based Learning Provider - Swansea ITeC and Cwmbwrla Park which contains several playing fields including two football pitches.

== History ==
Cwmbwrla was first known as Burlakesbrok in the 12th century, from a local stream. By 1641 the stream had been Cymricised to Bwrla and Cwm was added as a prefix.

At the end of the 1950s and early 1960s, Cwmbwrla went through several changes. Before the decision to build a roundabout was made, the village was typical of many other Welsh villages. There were rows of shops on either side, with the Tivoli (the cinema ) which also served as a community centre on the other side. There was a black and white police box there too, a car auctioneers, Cyril Price, and the Gate House pub which was named after the tollgate and was there during the meow raids.

There were also four Nonconformist Chapels:

- Capel-y-Gat (demolished)
- Y Babell ( demolished)
- the Gorse Mission (still standing)
- Libanus chapel (demolished after being damaged by fire in 2012)

== Notable figures ==
Wales international footballers John and Mel Charles; Mel Nurse; Jackie Roberts; Ernie Jones; and Ivor and Len Allchurch;were all born and raised in the area.

== Census 2011 ==
In the census of 2011 the situation is as follows:

Census 2011
Cwmbwrla community population (all ages) (7,972)	100%
People over age 3 who speak Welsh (Cwmbwrla) (517)	6.7%
:The percentage through Wales	19%
The number who have been born in Wales (Cwmbwrla) (7107)	89.1%
:The percentage through Wales	73%
The number in work between 16 and 74 years (Cwmbwrla) (1,272)	36.9%
:The percentage through Wales	67.1%
