= Mount Pleasant Hospital =

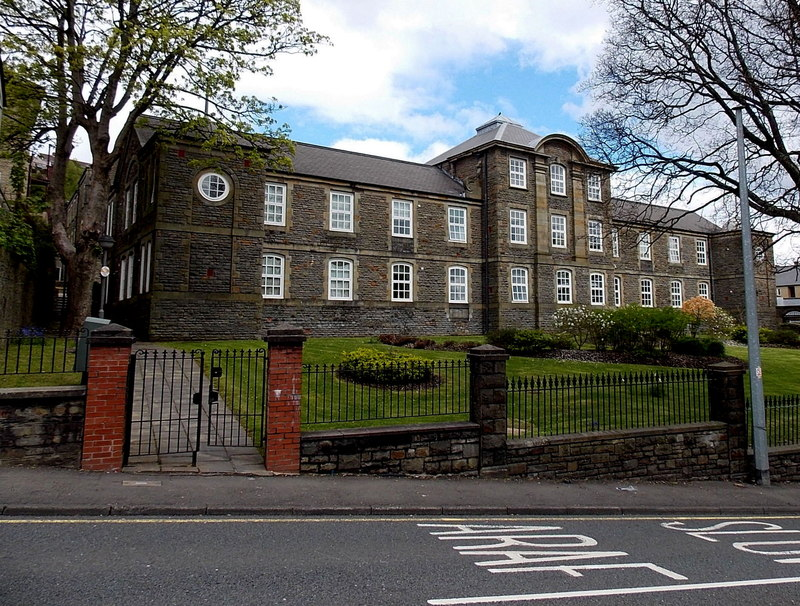
- Mount Pleasant Hospital

- Shown in Swansea

Geography
- Location: Mount Pleasant, Swansea, Wales, United Kingdom
- Coordinates: 51.6248°N 3.9506°W

Organisation
- Care system: NHS Wales
- Type: Community hospital

Services
- Emergency department: No

History
- Founded: 1862
- Closed: 1995

Mount Pleasant Hospital (Welsh: Ysbyty Mount Pleasant) was a health facility in Mount Pleasant, Swansea, Wales.

== History ==
The facility had its origins in the Swansea Union Workhouse which was opened in 1862. A large female infirmary designed by Herbert Wills was added in 1903. It became Mount Pleasant Hospital in 1929 and joined the National Health Service in 1948. After services had transferred to Singleton Hospital, Mount Pleasant Hospital closed in 1995, the site was subsequently sold to Swansea Housing Association and the buildings were converted into accommodation for housing association tenants in 1999.
