= Gendros =

District of Swansea, Wales

Coordinates: 51°38′29″N 3°58′09″W

- Location within Wales
- Country: Wales
- Sovereign state: United Kingdom
- Post town: SWANSEA
- Postcode district: SA5
- Dialling code: 01792
- Ambulance: Welsh

Gendros is a suburban district of the City and County of Swansea, Wales falling within the Cockett ward. Gendros approximates to the settlement northwest of Carmarthen Road (A483 road) between Cwmdu and Penlan. Other areas surrounding Gendros are Blaen-y-Maes, Ravenhill, Cwmbwrla, Cockett, Fforestfach and Mayhill and Townhill. Its post code begins with SA5.

Gendros has two churches, a primary school, a Community Centre, two parks, a library and multiple shops throughout. It is connected to Upper Kings Head Road, Carmarthen Road and Middle Road.

== Notable people ==
- Enzo Maccarinelli
- Neville Meade
