= Libanus Chapel, Swansea =

Former chapel in Cwmbwrla, Swansea, Wales

Coordinates: 51.63526°N 3.95230°W

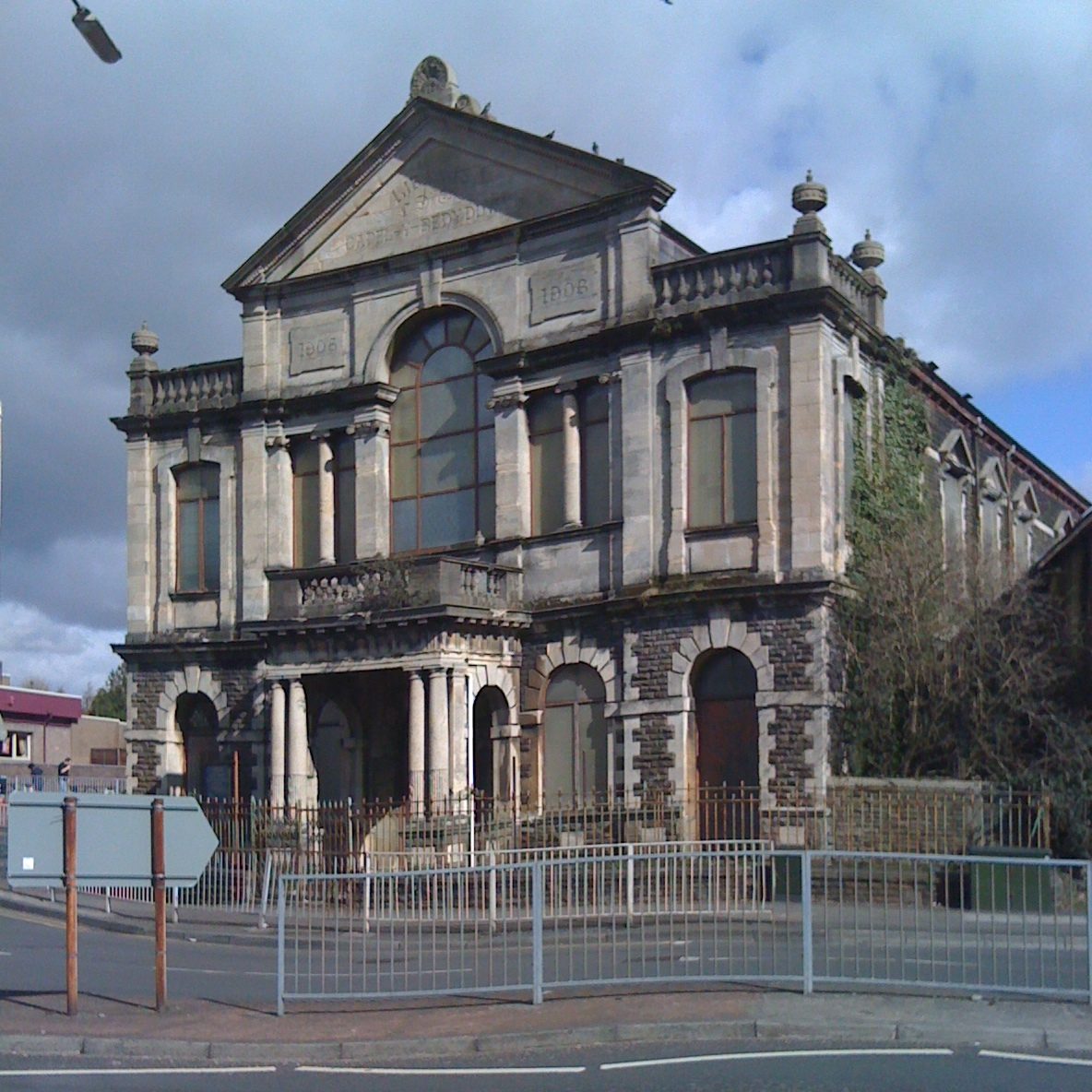
Libanus Chapel in March 2010

Libanus Chapel was a grade II listed building in Cwmbwrla, Swansea. The original building was built in 1867 to replace an earlier chapel dating from the mid-18th century, at a time when the congregation numbered over 600. The original chapel had been a subsidiary of Mynyddbach Chapel, but became independent in about 1826, following a religious revival. The land was donated by the industrialist Sir John Morris, 1st Baronet. An extension was added in 1906. After a decline in membership, the chapel shut in 2000.

== Fire and Demolition ==
In the early hours of Saturday 21 January 2012, a fire was started at the chapel. Media reports suggested that it was an arson attack. The blaze was discovered at 04.20 GMT and at its height 50 firefighters were at the scene. As a result of the fire, it was announced that the remains of the building would be demolished on the grounds of safety.
