= Swansea Vale =

Suburban development in Swansea, Wales

Coordinates: 51°40′12″N 3°54′03″W

Swansea Vale (Welsh: Bro Abertawe) is a 160-acre (0.65 km^{2}) mixed used recent suburb development site in Swansea, Wales. The area is bounded east by Birchgrove; south by Swansea Enterprise Park, west by the River Tawe and north by the M4 motorway.

The development is a partnership between the City and County of Swansea council and the Welsh Assembly Government and comprises a residential area (Tregof Village), a nature reserve and two business parks - Riverside Business Park and Central Business Park.

The Swansea Vale Nature Reserve consists of 6 hectares of land and is one of the few remaining areas of wetland habitat in Swansea. The reserve consists of woodland, rivers, ponds and marsh. The reserve is viewable by the public with a boardwalk built as a loop around the reserve.
