= A483 road =

Road in England and Wales

A483

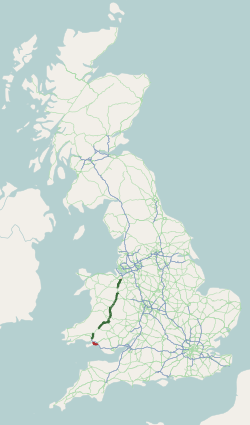

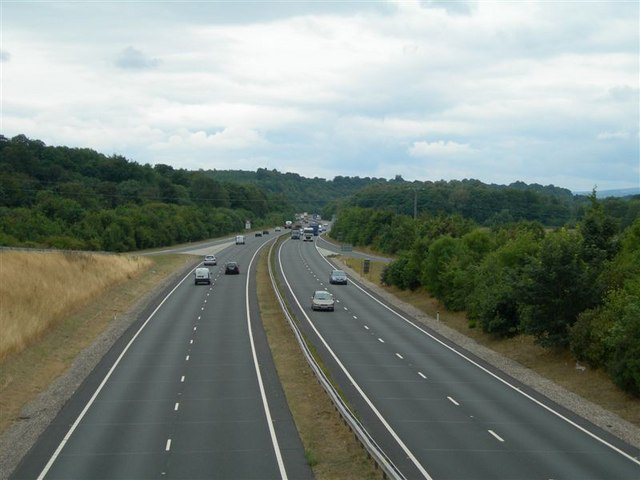

Route information
- Maintained by National Highways (England), English local authorities, South Wales Trunk Road Agent and North and Mid Wales Trunk Road Agent
- Length: 153 mi (246 km)

Major junctions
- South end: Swansea
- A48 M4 A4067 A4217 A4118 A4216 A484 A48 M4 A4138 M4 A48 A474 A476 A40 A470 A4081 A44 A489 A490 A458 A495 A5 A539 A5152 A525 A541 A5152 A5156 A55 A5104 A5268
- North end: Chester

Location
- Country: United Kingdom
- Primary destinations: Pontarddulais; Ammanford; Llandeilo; Llandovery; Llanwrtyd Wells; Builth Wells; Llandrindod Wells; Newtown; Welshpool; Oswestry; Ruabon; Wrexham

Road network
- Roads in the United Kingdom; Motorways; A and B road zones

The A483, officially described as the Swansea to Manchester Trunk Road, although now ending in Chester, is a major road in the United Kingdom. It runs from Swansea in Wales to Chester in England via Llandovery, Llandrindod Wells, Oswestry and Wrexham, a distance of around 153 miles (246 km).

== Route description ==
=== Swansea ===
The A483 begins at the M4 motorway junction 42, just east of Swansea. It travels west along the Fabian Way towards Swansea city centre, where it turns to a northwesterly direction. It meets the M4 again at junction 47 at Penllergaer, after which it multiplexes with the A48 along Swansea Road, Bryntirion Road and Bolgoed Road to Pontarddulais.

=== Carmarthenshire ===
After Pontarddulais, the route continues along Heol Fforest and Carmarthen Road. It diverges from the A48 at the M4 junction 49, turning northeast towards Ammanford and then north towards Llandeilo. At Llandeilo it joins the A40, then multiplexes with this route as far as Llandovery. From here, it continues north into Powys.

=== Powys ===
The A483 continues through Llanwrtyd Wells, Builth Wells (where it intersects with the A470) and Llandrindod Wells. It intersects with the A44 at Crossgates, just north of Llandrindod Wells, then continues to Newtown. The original route, through the centre of the town, passed under the Cambrian Line at the Dolfor Road Railway Bridge. This low bridge, with a height restriction of 13 ft 3 in (4.04 m), was hit by high vehicles on many occasions. A bypass to the Southeast of Newtown was opened in 2019, crossing the Cambrian Line to the East of the town before rejoining the original route. From Newtown, the road continues to Welshpool, running roughly parallel to the River Severn, before crossing the border into England at Llanymynech.

=== Shropshire ===
From Llanymynech, the A483 continues north, bypassing Oswestry. Here, it picks up a multiplex with the A5; the two routes then cross into Wales at Chirk.

=== Wrexham ===
After the A5 diverges to the west at Chirk, the A483 crosses the River Dee, then reaches Ruabon. Here, it becomes a dual carriageway with numbered grade-separated junctions.

Junction 1 – A539 Ruabon

Junction 2 – B5426 Johnstown

Junction 3 – A5152 Croesfoel

Junction 4 – A525 Ruthin Road

Junction 5 – A541 Mold Road

Junction 6 – A5156 (A534) Gresford

Junction 7 – B5102 Rossett

=== Cheshire ===
Just south of Chester, the A483 intersects with the A55 North Wales Expressway. It then continues as a single carriageway to its terminus at the city centre, crossing the Grosvenor Bridge over the Dee.

== Future ==
There have been demands for a dual carriageway from Shrewsbury to Wrexham, including the section of the A483 from Oswestry to Ruabon; also a campaign by residents for a bypassing Llanymynech and Pant.

== See also ==
- Trunk roads in Wales
