= Manselton =

Coordinates: 51.63736°N 3.95376°W

Manselton: Welsh: Trefansel
- Location within Swansea
- Population: 7,000
- OS grid reference: SS648949
- Principal area: Swansea
- Preserved county: West Glamorgan
- Country: Wales
- Sovereign state: United Kingdom
- Post town: SWANSEA
- Postcode district: SA5
- Dialling code: 01792
- Police: South Wales
- Fire: Mid and West Wales
- Ambulance: Welsh
- UK Parliament: Swansea East
- Senedd Cymru – Welsh Parliament: Swansea East

Manselton (Welsh: Trefansel) is a suburban area of Swansea, Wales falling within the Cwmbwrla ward. Manselton approximates to the area to the west of Llangyfelach Road just north of the railway line from Landore depot to west Wales.

Manselton consists mainly of suburban housing, although there is a large, open park area and a number of convenience stores, hairdressers, and beauty salons.

Despite a number of public houses being in close proximity to Manselton, none are actually within its boundary.

== History ==
The Manselton Hotel was built in 1886 by Sir Richard Mansel as a private hotel. Sir Richard Mansel was head of the local Temperance Society and therefore no sale of alcohol was allowed on the Manselton Estate.

The nearby Racecourse was attracting crowds of up to 60,000 and some horse owners (mostly Irish) stayed at the Hotel. For this reason, Sir Richard Mansel moved Manselton Hotel outside of the Manselton Boundary into the neighbouring Brynhyfred to allow the sale of alcohol to the Irish guests.

The local temperance was outraged by this and rolled the barrels of ale down Manor Road directly opposite. Currently do date, there are no public houses within Manselton. However, there is a private members club on Major Street.

== Local Education ==
In August 2012, the local primary School, Manselton Primary School closed due to building safety regulations. A new school was built within the nearby Cwmbwrla Park merging with Cwmbwrla Primary School to form a new Burlais Primary School. Manselton is the local catchment area for Pentrehafod Comprehensive School.

== Listed Buildings ==
Grade II listed buildings in the area include:

- Mount Calvary Baptist Chapel & Hall on Cecil Street
- Manselton School & attached Block on Manor Road
- St. Michael & All Angel's Church on Manor Road

== Community Facilities ==
Manselton is home to numerous community facilities such as

- Manselton Surgery (Elgin Street)
- Local Pharmacy (Manselton Road)
- Manselton Community Centre (Accessible via the lane behind pharmacy)
