= Swansea Enterprise Park =

Business and retail park in Swansea, Wales

The Swansea Enterprise Park (Welsh: Parc Menter Abertawe) is a combined business park, retail park and industrial estate in Swansea, Wales. In 1981 it became the first enterprise zone in the United Kingdom, and the largest. Originally it was named the Swansea Enterprise Zone. The designated area covers parts of the Llansamlet and Morriston wards in the Lower Swansea valley, Wales. The Enterprise Park is the largest commercial district and the largest out-of-town shopping district of Swansea. Major employers at the site include Morganite, Alberto-Culver, Viskase, The Land Registry and Welsh Water.

The Swansea Enterprise Park is bounded by the A4067 and the A4217 roads to the west and east; and the South Wales Main Line to the southeast. It includes the Winch Wen industrial estate just east of the A4217; and the area just north of the A48 (Samlet Road) to the east and west of Upper Forest Way. The whole area comprises 735 acres (2.97 km^{2}) of land.

For many years this was a post-industrial wasteland until regeneration in the 1980s. The regeneration has attracted many light industries, offices and in particular retail outlets to Swansea. The Morfa Shopping Park is located adjacent to the enterprise park to the south in Landore and the Swansea Vale regeneration area is located just to the north.

The retail park of the Swansea Enterprise Park was largely unplanned and followed the relaxation of planning controls and local taxes following the area's designation as an enterprise zone. In 1996 a number of local retailers attempted to rebrand the area as the "Swansea Lakeside Shopping Park".

== Lake Fendrod ==
In the heart of the enterprise park is a 13-acre (53,000 m^{2}) lake called Lake Fendrod (51°39′17″N 3°54′55″W). The lake is home to swans. Boating and fishing are popular pastimes on the lake. Fish stocks in the lake include Carp, Tench, Bream, Roach, Koi, and several other species. There is a footpath encircling the lake, and another hidden lake in the area is Half Round Pond to the west of Siemens Way. The lake is fed by the Nant-y-fendrod stream, and its outflow continues as the Nant-y-fendrod, to join the River Tawe.

In August 2011 a series of outdoor gym equipment was installed by The Great Outdoor Gym Company. The equipment is located at the front of the lake, adjacent to the footpath and in close proximity to the car park. The outdoor gym contains several cross trainers, exercise cycles, amongst other popular gym equipment.

== Valley Way: St. Davids road ==
- Comet (1988–2006)
- Maplin (1998–2018)
- Currys (1998–2011)
- PC World (1998–2011)

== Nantyffin Road ==
- Comet (March 2006 – 18 December 2012)
