= Townhill, Swansea =

Residential area and community in Swansea, Wales

Coordinates: 51.62833°N 3.96624°W

Townhill
- Community
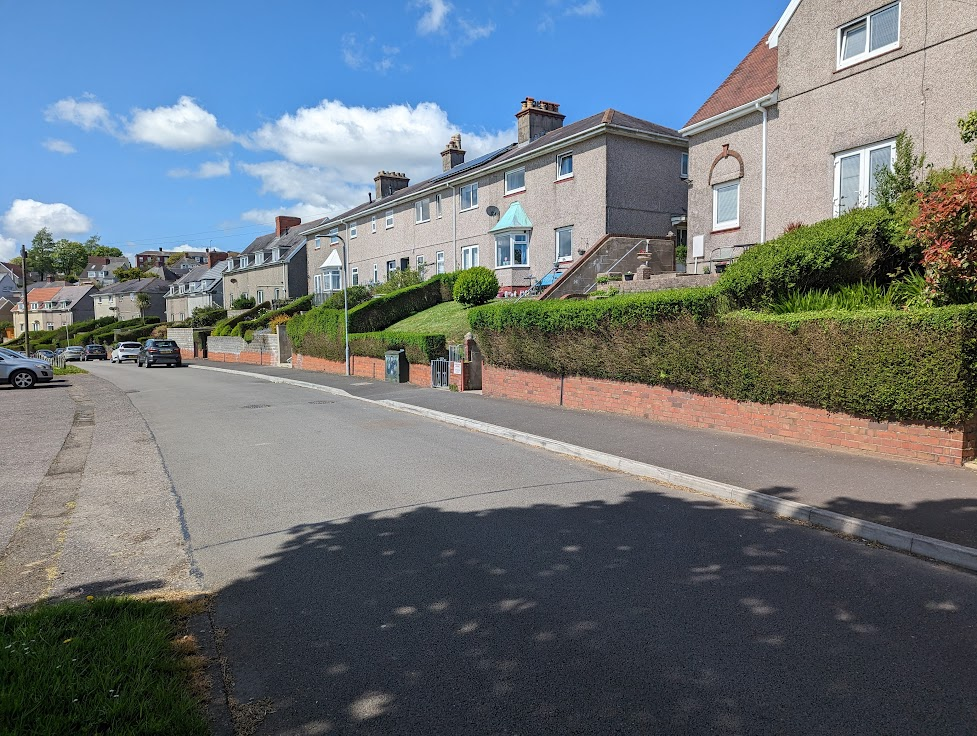
- Council housing on Pantycelyn Road, Swansea built in the 1920s on the model of the Garden city movement as part of the Townhill estate.
- Principal area: Swansea
- Country: Wales
- Sovereign state: United Kingdom
- Police: South Wales
- Fire: Mid and West Wales
- Ambulance: Welsh
- List of places UK Wales Swansea Map of the community

Townhill is a residential district, community and electoral ward in Swansea, Wales. It is named after a local hill.

== History ==
In medieval Swansea Townhill was an area of woodland and heathland designated as common land. It was commonly referred to as “the mountain” and in Welsh as Graig Llwyd. The name Town Hill came into common use in the mid-18th century. After The Town-Hill and Burrows Enclosure Act of 1762 the area was, apart from remnants of the (still surviving) heathland, transformed into farmland.

The origins of Townhill as a housing estate lie in the efforts of Swansea County Borough Council at the turn of the 20th century to remedy the lack of good quality affordable housing for working class families. The council established a Housing Department in 1902 and an Estates Department in 1904. Influenced by the Garden City housing reform movement of the time, in 1910 the council organised an exhibition of model working class houses which led to the construction of experimental blocks of newly designed council houses in neighbouring Mayhill. The success and cost-effectiveness of this project encouraged the council to commission plans for the design of a new estate on Townhill and by 1913 plans for the construction of 500 houses were in place. The project was led by the Borough Architect Ernest Morgan who engaged as a consultant Raymond Unwin, the leading advocate of the garden city movement.

Due to the outbreak of the First World War building work was delayed until the 1920s. The new post-war government’s “homes fit for heroes” initiative provided funding through the Housing, Town Planning, &c. Act 1919 which Swansea Council was readily able to access with its pre-war plans already in place. During the interwar period the Townhill estate along with the neighbouring Mayhill development were completed in a programme of council house provision in Swansea in which 4000 properties were constructed.

The new streets in the Townhill and Mayhill developments were named after significant figures in Welsh history and culture. Townhill Community School, designed by Ernest Morgan, was built in 1924.

In 1912 the Swansea Training College for teachers moved from the city centre to a new building on the western slopes of Townhill. It subsequently became part of the West Glamorgan Institute of Higher Education (from 1976 to 1992) and then the Swansea Institute (from 1992 to 2008) Thereafter it became a campus of Swansea Metropolitan University which later merged with the University of Wales Trinity Saint David. The campus was closed in 2018 and the site allocated for a housing development in which the original features of the Edwardian building were to be preserved.

== Townhill district ==
The suburb of Townhill falls within the Townhill electoral ward. It had a population of 8,696 in 2011. The district of Townhill consists of a council estate and some private housing spread over a steep hill of the same name bordering Mayhill to the east and visible from the Swansea city centre. The area overlooks Swansea city centre, Swansea Docks and Swansea Bay to the south; and Cockett, Gendros and Cwmbwrla to the north.

Local amenities at the top of the hill include a public library, the Townhill Community primary school, a nursery school and some playing fields. Townhill is a Communities First area.

=== Townhill churches ===
Townhill Baptist Church was formed in the late 1920s and the church still meets today on Sunday mornings and evenings in the original building on Powys Avenue.

St Nicholas on the Hill, the parish church for Townhill and Mayhill, is located on the corner of Dyfed Avenue and Powys Avenue. With the closure of St Jude in Mount Pleasant in 2015, the two parishes were merged into The Benefice of Swansea St Nicholas on the Hill and St Jude.

== Townhill landform ==
Backing Swansea city centre to the north is a large slab of sandstone called Townhill. The summit of Townhill is approximately 175m above sea level. At the top of hill lies the housing estate of Townhill which falls away to the north west of the hill. The Mayhill district lies on the northeast face of the hill. The southeastern face of the hill is the steepest and is covered by the district of Mount Pleasant. The Uplands district occupies the southwestern face of the hill which slopes gently downwards towards Singleton Park.

=== Rosehill Quarry Community Park ===
The hill is rounded by a band of rock which is too steep to develop on and is recognised by the City and County of Swansea council as a wildlife corridor. In this band, on the south side of the hill is the designated Rosehill Quarry Community Park. Rosehill Quarry is a semi-natural urban green space which is not formally cultivated in its entirety. Wildlife areas include a stream, waterfall and several ponds. There are over one hundred species of plants including oak, royal fern and rowan trees. Around thirty species of birds can be found in the park, including sparrowhawk, kestrel, and tawny owl. Additionally, there are frogs, newts, dragonfiles and damselflies including the blue-tailed damselfly, which is used as the quarry's symbol. Recreational facilities in the park include picnic tables, play equipment, and a BMX bike track.

The Rosehill Quarry six-acre site was quarried for stone for house-building from the 1840s, creating the only flat ground in the area. The area stood derelict for some time until the early 20th century when the area was used as a tennis court which later fell into disuse. In the 1970s, planning permission was granted for a block of flats, which never got built. In the 1970s and 1980s, local residents' initiatives persuaded the local council to buy the land and designate it as a public open space in the local plan. The Rosehill Quarry Group was formed, with support from the council, to develop and maintain the quarry as the first community park in Swansea.
