= Mount Pleasant, Swansea =

Suburb of Swansea, Wales

Coordinates: 51°37′25″N 3°57′0″W

Mount Pleasant is a suburban neighbourhood of Swansea, Wales. The area is centred on the main road, called Mount Pleasant, immediately to the north of Swansea city centre, which connects the city centre to the Townhill and Mayhill districts to the north. It falls partly within the Castle ward and Uplands wards. The demographic of the area changed in recent years with the expansion of the former Swansea Metropolitan University campus on the main Mount Pleasant road and the arrival of a substantial student population.

Mount Pleasant has terraced housing to the north with larger semi-detached houses overlooking its southern slopes. The Mount Pleasant Estate, a substantial development of four parallel roads of back-to-back terraced housing was completed in 1900.

Constitution Hill, one of the steepest in Swansea, leads up towards Mount Pleasant from the city centre. It is a steep, sloping cobbled street which featured in the film Twin Town in a scene with a daring car stunt. In the early 20th century, the Swansea Constitution Hill Incline Railway operated up and down the hill. Constitution Hill forms part of the boundary between the Castle and Uplands wards.

Mansell Street, De La Beche Street, Grove Place, and Alexandra Road cross the southern fringes of the area as a continuous thoroughfare. Located on this thoroughfare are Swansea Magistrates' Court, Swansea Central police station, Glynn Vivian Art Gallery, the old Swansea Central Library and the building housing the arts wing of the university. Alexandra Road is a designated conservation area, and consists of a number of buildings which were constructed between the late nineteenth and early twentieth centuries. The road has a number of shops.

== History ==
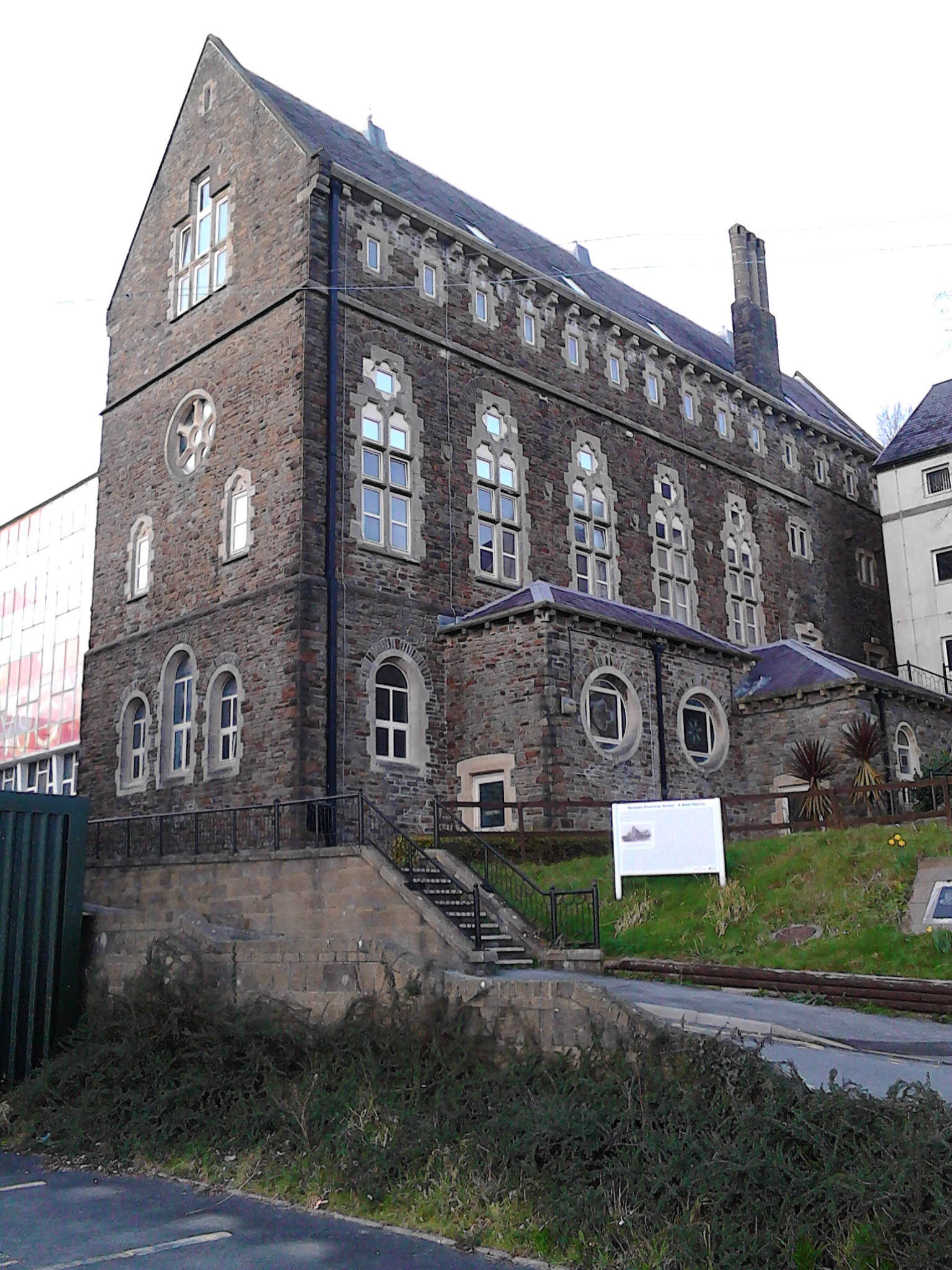
Most of the former Swansea Grammar School site on Mount Pleasant was destroyed by incendiary bombs during the Swansea blitz of World War II. This main surviving structure, then part of Swansea Metropolitan University, was renamed the Dylan Thomas Building in 1988 to honour its former pupil.

The road that runs from the end of the High Street up to Mount Pleasant, North Hill Road, was named Gibbet Hill until renamed in 1902. Evidence from the Vatican archives indicates that Gibbet Hill, at the top of the road to which it gave its name, was the historic place of the “lord’s gallows” where in the Middle Ages executions (gibbetings) took place and corpses were left hanging where they could be seen from the town centre.

A workhouse opened in Mount Pleasant in 1862, between what was known as Gibbet Hill (now North Hill Road) and a lower slope known as Poppit Hill. In 1895 it held 584 inmates in extended buildings. It was later called Tawe Lodge, and eventually became Mount Pleasant Hospital in 1929, when it was taken over by Swansea County Borough Council. The hospital closed in 1995 and was converted into social housing. Hospital records are now held by the West Glamorgan Archive Service, as are records of the original Swansea Poor Law Union from 1842 to 1960.

In 1853 Swansea Grammar School for Boys moved from the city centre to a new building on Mount Pleasant designed by the architect Thomas Taylor. The building was extended in 1869 to a design by Benjamin Bucknall. From 1895 the site was shared with the newly created Swansea Intermediate and Technical School for Boys (later the co-educational Swansea Technical College). After much of the site was destroyed by incendiary bombs during World War II the Grammar School relocated to the Sketty area as Bishop Gore Grammar School in 1952. The Technical College remained on a redeveloped site and in 1976 was incorporated into the West Glamorgan Institute of Higher Education, redesignated in 2008 as Swansea Metropolitan University which in 2013 became a constituent member of the University of Wales Trinity Saint David. The university closed its Mount Pleasant campus in 2018 relocating most of its faculties to the SA1 Waterfront area. The Arts faculty, Swansea College of Arts, remains in Mount Pleasant on its Alexander Road site where a new building was opened in 2015 in a redevelopment of the former Dynevor Grammar School site.

Terrace Road, which runs off Mount Pleasant to the west, has two notable buildings: a Primary School which opened in 1888 and has approximately 300 pupils and St Jude's Church which opened in 1915 and served a congregation which dates from 1889. St Jude closed in 2015 and its parish was merged with St Nicholas on the Hill in Townhill.

Mount Pleasant Baptist Church on Kingsway, one of the city's busiest roads, was built in 1825, when the street was named Gower Street. Christmas Evans preached at its opening service in the following year. It was built to accommodate English speakers in the congregation of the former Back Lane chapel when it divided after the death of its minister Joseph Harris (Gomer). It is one of the few notable buildings in the centre of the town to survive bombing during the Swansea Blitz in the Second World War.
