= Mayhill =

District and community in Swansea

Coordinates: 51°37′50.00″N 3°57′8.00″W

Mayhill is a district of Swansea, Wales, situated on historic Townhill, a 175m high landform north west of the city centre, the urban geography of which is divided between the Townhill district to the west and Mayhill to the east. Mayhill is part of the Townhill electoral ward.

== History ==
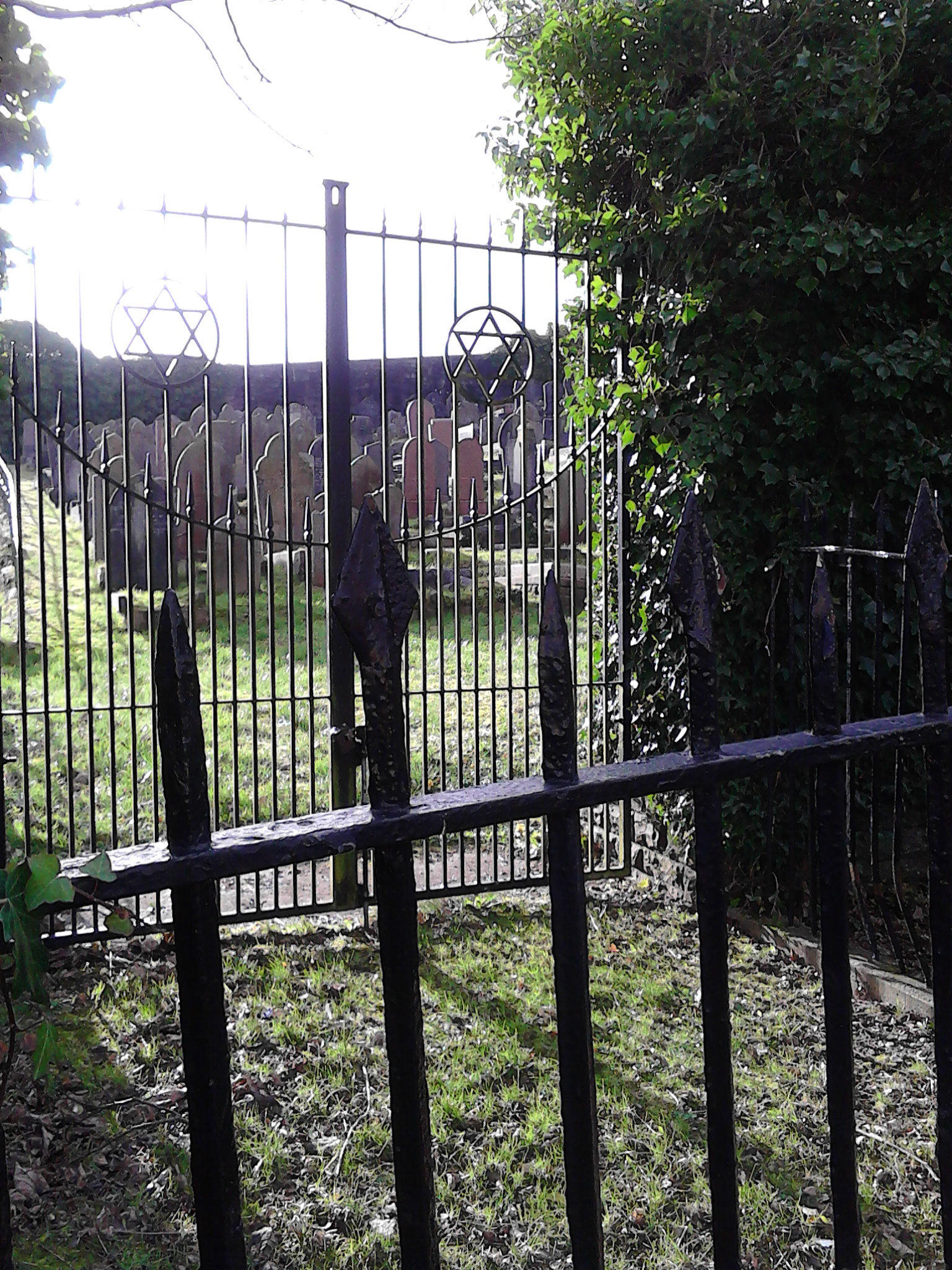
The Jewish Burial Ground, Mayhill, Swansea, which dates from 1768

Before the urban development of the area it was occupied mostly by farmland established after the 1762 Town-Hill and Burrows Enclosure Act on what was formerly common land. A water course known as the Washing Lake (or, in Welsh, Nant y Prys) which supplied the town before reservoir storage was developed in the 19th century originates on Mayhill and survives to the present day, passing through what is now the Hillside Wildlife Corridor. Gibbet Hill on Mayhill was the historic place of the “lord’s gallows” where, in the Middle Ages, executions took place and corpses were left hanging where they could be seen from the town centre. A Jewish burial ground on the lower slopes of Mayhill dates from 1768. The first asylum house for the mentally ill to have been opened in Wales was established in Mayhill by Dr Thomas Hobbes in 1815.

Mayhill was one the first areas of Swansea to benefit from the development of council housing in the early years of the 20th century when Swansea Borough Council sought to address the issue of the poor quality of the housing stock available to working class families. One of the first projects it authorised was the Baptist Well Estate, a scheme for 142 terraced houses which included Shelley and Byron Crescents (subsequently renamed High View and Long Ridge respectively), built in 1910 on the lower slopes of Mayhill. Influenced by the housing reform movement of the time, the Council went on to organise an exhibition in 1910 of newly designed Garden city style houses which became allocated to a site in Mayhill. The exhibition houses were built at Llewelyn Circle(1-7, 12-13 and 18-22), Tan y Marian Road(1-5 ) and Nicander Parade (1-8 and 11-14). Altogether 29 houses were built on Mayhill by 1914. The Council's own Direct Administration unit built 11-25 Tan y Marian Road and 2 to 12 Islwyn Road. The Council's plans to expand the Mayhill Garden City development had to be deferred until the mid-1920s due to the outbreak of the First World War.

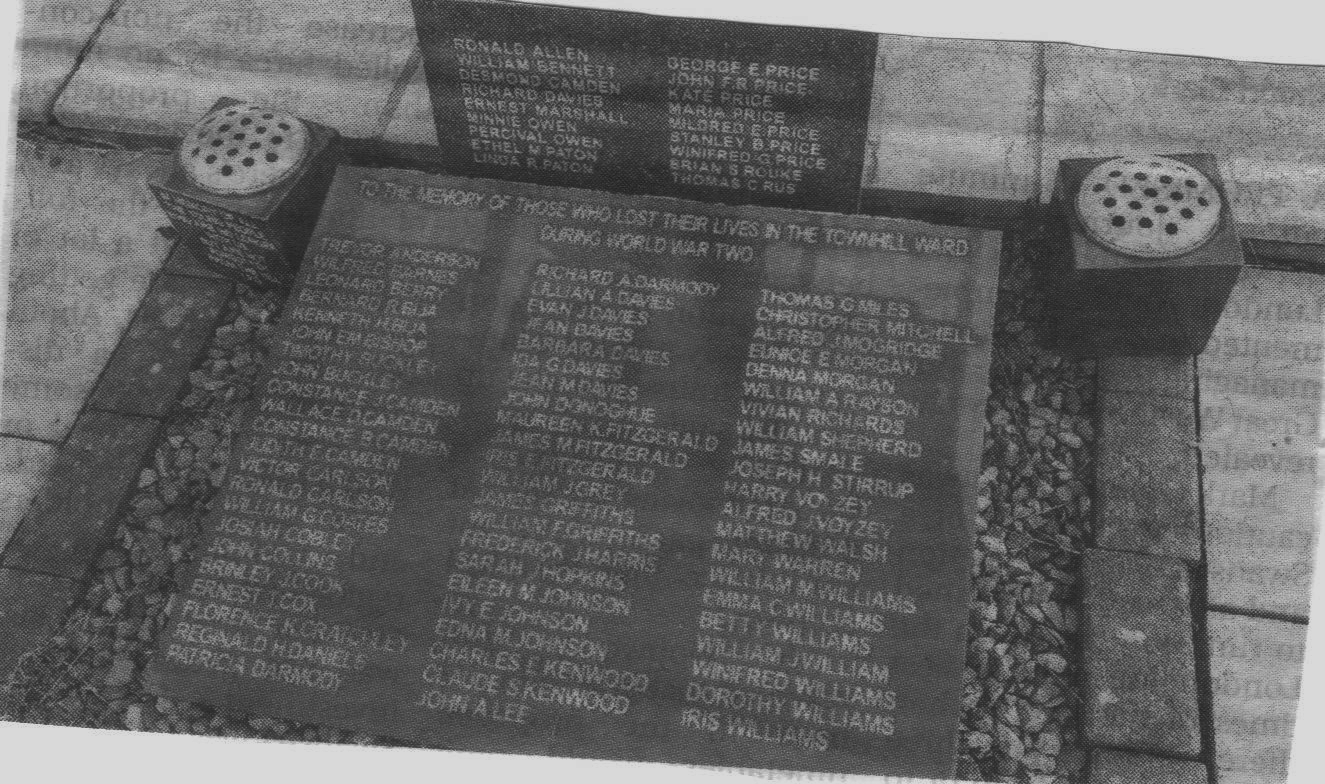
Memorial plaque in Teilo Crescent, Mayhill for residents from the locality who lost their lives in the Second World War.

=== Swansea Blitz ===
Over a period of three days from 19 February 1941 during the Second World War, successive German bombing raids caused devastation in Swansea in what became known as the Swansea Blitz. During one such raid on 20 February 1941, fourteen homes were destroyed and twenty-four residents and another six firemen and civil defence volunteers perished at Teilo Crescent, Mayhill. Altogether 38 people in the locality were killed during the raid, the worst single incident in Swansea's war. A memorial plaque in Teilo Crescent commemorates the lost lives and those of others from Mayhill and the neighbouring Townhill district killed during the war.

== Mayhill district ==
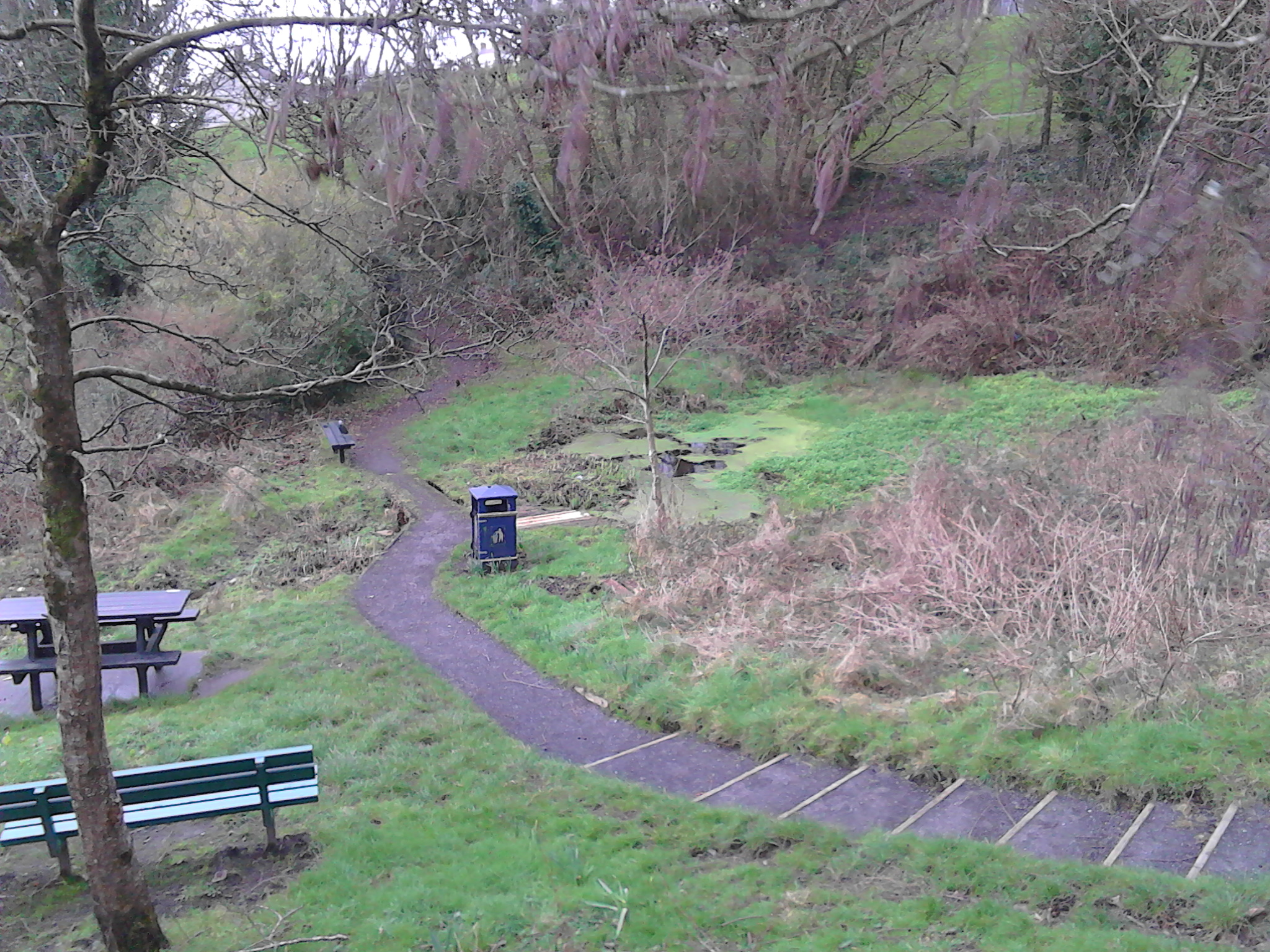
Part of the Hillside Wildlife Corridor, Mayhill where it is crossed by the "Washing Lake" an important water course for pre-industrial Swansea which originates on Mayhill.

Mayhill is geographically divided into Mayhill South (Mayhill Garden City) and Mayhill North (Mountain View) by Townhill Road. It is in the Townhill ward.

The south side of Mayhill overlooks the city centre, docklands and Swansea Bay. A prominent landmark on Mayhill, visible from the city centre and Hafod, is Sea View Primary School designed by the Swansea Borough architect, Ernest Morgan. The north side of Mayhill looks out towards the northern districts of Swansea and onwards towards the mountainous terrain of the Brecon Beacons.

Mayhill features several park and nature reserve areas, including Bryn y Don park, the Hillside Wildlife Corridor and a Site of Special Scientific Interest on the border of Townhill, opposite Our Lady of Lourdes Roman Catholic church. The largest open space recreational area is around Sea View Primary School and includes parkland, small wooded areas, and heathland. There are woodland areas between Waun Wen Road and Townhill Road.

West End F.C. play at Pryderi Park Stadium in the area.
