= List of electoral wards in Swansea =

This list of electoral wards in Swansea includes council wards in City and County of Swansea, Wales, which elect councillors to City and County of Swansea Council.

The county is divided into 32 electoral divisions, returning a total of 75 county councillors. Some of these divisions are coterminous with communities (civil parishes) of the same name. Some communities have their own elected community council.

A boundary review changed a number of county wards, affective from the 2022 local elections.

== Current wards ==
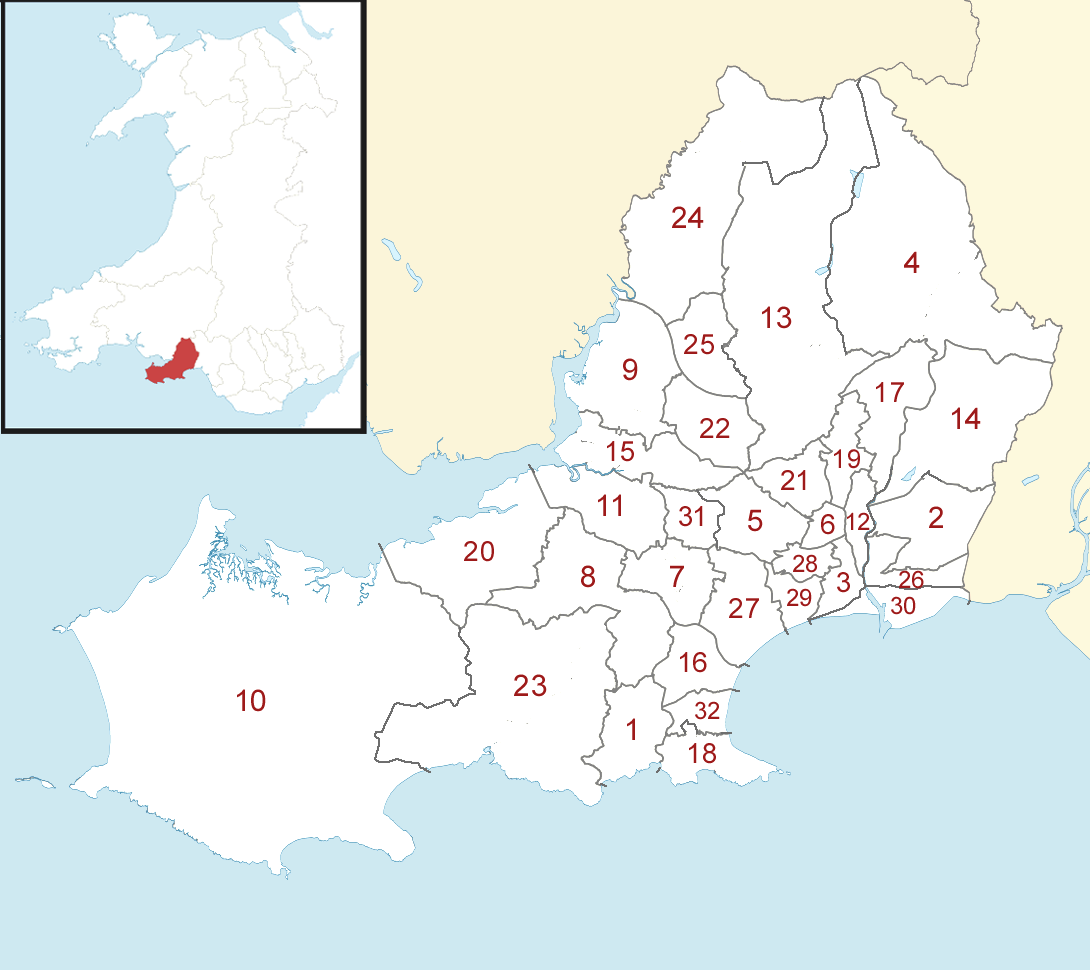
Electoral ward map of Swansea (numbered)

=== City and county wards ===
The following table lists the post-2022 city and county wards, the numbers of councillors elected and the communities they cover:

| Map # | Ward | County Councillors | Communities (Parishes) | Places covered | Population |
|---|---|---|---|---|---|
| 1 | Bishopston^{c} | 1 | Bishopston* | Barland Common, Caswell, Bishopston, Clyne Common, Manselfield, Murton, Oldway | |
| 2 | Bon-y-maen^{c} | 2 | Bon-y-maen | Pentrechwyth, Pentre Dwr, Winch Wen | |
| 3 | Castle^{c} | 4 | Castle | Swansea city centre, Brynmelin, Dyfatty, Mount Pleasant (part) and Sandfields | |
| 4 | Clydach | 3 | Clydach*, Mawr* (Craig-Cefn-Parc ward) | Clydach, Craig-cefn-parc, Faerdre, Glais (East) and Penydre | |
| 5 | Cockett^{c} | 3 | Cockett | Cadle, Cwmdu (part), Coedweig, Gendros, Gors, Fforestfach | |
| 6 | Cwmbwrla^{c} | 3 | Cwmbwrla | Brondeg, Brynhyfryd, Cwmdu, Gendros, Manselton | |
| 7 | Dunvant and Killay | 3 | Dunvant, Killay | Dunvant, Killay | |
| 8 | Fairwood | 1 | Upper Killay*,Llanrhidian Higher* (Three Crosses ward) | Upper Killay, Three Crosses | |
| 9 | Gorseinon and Penyrheol | 3 | Gorseinon*, Grovesend and Waungron | Gorseinon town, Grovesend, Waungron | |
| 10 | Gower | 1 | Ilston*, Llangennith, Llanmadoc and Cheriton*, Llanrhidian Lower*, Penrice*, Port Eynon*, Reynoldston,* Rhossili* | Cheriton, Fairyhill, Horton, Knelston, Landimore, Llanddewi, Llangennith, Llanmadoc, Llanrhidian, Middleton, Nicholaston, Oldwalls, Overton, Oxwich Green, Oxwich, Penrice, Port Eynon, Reynoldston, Rhossili, Grovesend, Llanmorlais, Pentrebach, Pont-Lliw, Poundffald, Slade | |
| 11 | Gowerton^{c} | 2 | Gowerton* | Gowerton village, Penclawdd | |
| 12 | Landore^{c} | 2 | Landore | Hafod, Landore, Morfa, Plasmarl | |
| 13 | Llangyfelach | 1 | Llangyfelach*, Mawr* (Felindre ward) | Felindre, Llangyfelach, Tyn-y-cwm | |
| 14 | Llansamlet | 4 | Llansamlet, Birchgrove | Birchgrove, Glais, Heol Las, Llansamlet, Morriston, Talycoppa, Summerhill and Trallwn | |
| 15 | Llwchwr^{c} | 3 | Llwchwr* | Loughor | |
| 16 | Mayals | 1 | Mumbles* (Mayals ward) | Blackpill, Mayals | |
| 17 | Morriston^{c} | 5 | Morriston | Caemawr, Cwmrhydyceirw, Morriston town, Parc Gwernfadog, Pant-lasau, Ynysforgan and Ynystawe | |
| 18 | Mumbles | 3 | Mumbles* (Newton and Oystermouth wards) | Langland, Mumbles, Newton, Oystermouth, Thistleboon | |
| 19 | Mynydd-bach^{c} | 3 | Mynyddbach | Clase, Clasemont, Park View Estate, Penfillia Estate, Treboeth, Tirdeunaw, Pinewood, Mynydd Garnlywd and Bryn Rock | |
| 20 | Pen-clawdd | 1 | Llanrhidian Higher* | Blue Anchor, Llanmorlais, Penclawdd, Crofty and Wernffrwd | |
| 21 | Penderry^{c} | 3 | Penderry | Penlan, Portmead, Blaen-y-Maes, Fforesthall and Caereithin | |
| 22 | Penllergaer^{c} | 1 | Penllergaer* | Penllergaer | |
| 23 | Pennard | 1 | Pennard*, Ilston | Bishopston, Fairwood Common, Ilston, Kittle, Parkmill, Penmaen, Southgate | |
| 24 | Pontarddulais | 2 | Pontarddulais*, Mawr* (Garnswllt ward) | Pontarddulais town, Garnswllt, Pentrebach | |
| 25 | Pontlliw and Tircoed^{c} | 1 | Pontlliw and Tircoed* | Pontlliw, Tircoed | |
| 26 | St. Thomas^{c} | 2 | St. Thomas | Dan-y-graig, Port Tennant, Kilvey Hill and the Grenfell Park Area, St. Thomas | |
| 27 | Sketty^{c} | 5 | Sketty | Carnglas, Clyne Valley (Gwerneinon), Derwen Fawr, Hendrefoilan, Killay, Singleton Park, Sketty village, Tycoch, Cwmgwyn | |
| 28 | Townhill^{c} | 3 | Townhill | Cwm-Gwyn, Mayhill, Mount Pleasant, Townhill | |
| 29 | Uplands^{c} | 4 | Uplands | Brynmill, St. Helens, Cwmgwyn, Ffynone and The Lons, Uplands | |
| 30 | Waterfront^{c} | 1 | Waterfront | Maritime Quarter, SA1 Swansea Waterfront | |
| 31 | Waunarlwydd^{c} | 1 | Waunarlwydd | Waunarlwydd | |
| 32 | West Cross | 2 | Mumbles* (West Cross ward) | Norton, West Cross | |

* = Communities which elect a community council
^{c} = Ward coterminous with community of the same name

=== Community council wards ===
| Community | Community Council | Community wards | Community Councillors |
|---|---|---|---|
| Bishopston | Bishopston CC | Bishopston; Murton | 14 |
| Clydach | Clydach CC | Clydach; Graigfelen; Vardre | 6; 4; 5 |
| Gorseinon | Gorseinon Town Council | Gorseinon Central; Gorseinon East; Gorseinon West; Penyrheol | 3; 4; 3; 5 |
| Gowerton | Gowerton CC | East; West | 8; 5 |
| Grovesend and Waungron | Grovesend and Waungron CC | | 9 |
| Ilston | Ilston CC | Ilston; Penmaen; Nicholaston | 5; 4; 2 |
| Killay | | | |
| Llangyfelach | | | |
| Llangennith, Llanmadoc and Cheriton | Llangennith, Llanmadoc and Cheriton CC | Llangennith; Llanmadoc; Cheriton | 5; 3; 2 |
| Llanrhidian Higher | | | |
| Llanrhidian Lower | | | |
| Llwchwr | | Kingsbridge; Lower Loughor; Upper Loughor | 5; 4; 5 |
| Mawr | Mawr CC | Craig-Cefn-Parc; Felindre; Garnswllt | 12 |
| Mumbles | | Mayals; Newton; Oystermouth; West Cross | 3; 4; 5; 6 |
| Penllergaer | | | |
| Pennard | Pennard CC | Kittle; Southgate | 3; 11 |
| Penrice | Penrice CC | Horton; Oxwich; Penrice | 4; 3; 2 |
| Pontarddulais | Pontarddulais Town Council | Dulais East; Dulais West; Talybont; Pentrebach; Goppa | 16 |
| Port Eynon | | | |
| Reynoldston | | | |
| Rhossili | | | |
| Three Crosses | | | |
| Upper Killay | | | |

== 2022 ward changes ==
In 2021 a large number of proposals by the Local Democracy and Boundary Commission for Wales were confirmed, to reduce the number of wards to Swansea Council, from 36 to 32, but with the number of councillors increasing from 72 to 75. This was designed to make the ratio between councillors and voters more equal.

Fifteen ward boundaries would be unaffected (though with a few name changes): Bishopston, Bonymaen (now Bon-y-maen), Cwmbwrla, Fairwood, Landore, Llansamlet, Mayals, Morriston, Mynyddbach (now Mynydd-bach), Penclawdd, Penderry, Penllergaer, Sketty, Townhill and Uplands.

The large Mawr ward ceased to exist, its communities divided amongst neighbouring wards and a new ward of Pontlliw and Tircoed created. A Mumbles ward was created by merging the Newton and Oystermouth wards. A Llwchwr ward was created by merging Kingsbridge, Lower Loughor and Upper Loughor. A new Waterfront ward was created from parts of the Castle ward and St Thomas ward. A new Waunarlwyd ward was created from part of Cockett. Dunvant, Killay North and Killay South were merged to create a Dunvant and Killay ward. The Gorseinon and Penyrheol wards were combined to become Gorseinon and Penyrheol.

== Pre-2022 wards ==
Pre-2022 electoral ward map of Swansea

Prior to a 2021 ward boundary review, the city was divided into 36 electoral wards. Most of these wards were coterminous with communities (parishes) of the same name. Each community can have an elected council. The following table lists pre-2022 council wards, communities and associated geographical areas. Communities with a community council are indicated with a '*':

| Map # | Ward | County Councillors | Communities (Parishes) | Places covered | Population | Land Area (km^{2}) |
|---|---|---|---|---|---|---|
| 1 | Bishopston^{c} | 1 | Bishopston* | Barland Common, Caswell, Bishopston, Clyne Common, Manselfield, Murton, Oldway | 3,341 | 5.89 |
| 2 | Bon-y-maen^{c} | 2 | Bon-y-maen | Pentrechwyth, Pentre Dwr, Winch Wen | 6,342 | 8.47 |
| 3 | Castle^{c} | 4 | Castle | Swansea city centre, Brynmelin, Dyfatty, Maritime Quarter, parts of Mount Pleasant and Sandfields | 11,933 | 3.03 |
| 4 | Clydach^{c} | 2 | Clydach* | Clydach, Faerdre, Glais (East) and Penydre | 7,320 | 8.46 |
| 5 | Cockett^{c} | 4 | Cockett | Cadle, Cwmdu, Coedweig, Gendros, Gors, Fforestfach, Waunarlwydd | 12,586 | 8.6 |
| 6 | Cwmbwrla^{c} | 3 | Cwmbwrla | Brondeg, Brynhyfryd, Cwmdu, Gendros, Manselton | 8,217 | 1.5 |
| 7 | Dunvant^{c} | 2 | Dunvant | Dunvant, Killay | 4,679 | 2.41 |
| 8 | Fairwood | 1 | Upper Killay*, Three Crosses ward of the community of Llanrhidian Higher* | Upper Killay, Three Crosses | 2,774 | 13.44 |
| 9 | Gorseinon | 1 | Gorseinon Central and Gorseinon East wards of the community of Gorseinon* | Gorseinon town | 3,275 | 2.23 |
| 10 | Gower | 1 | Ilston*, Llangennith, Llanmadoc and Cheriton *, Llanrhidian Lower*, Penrice*, Port Eynon*, Reynoldston,* Rhossili* | Cheriton, Fairyhill, Horton, Knelston, Landimore, Llanddewi, Llangennith, Llanmadoc, Llanrhidian, Middleton, Nicholaston, Oldwalls, Overton, Oxwich Green, Oxwich, Parkmill, Penmaen, Penrice, Port Eynon, Reynoldston, Rhossili, Grovesend, Llanmorlais, Pentrebach, Pont-Lliw, Poundffald, Slade | 3,654 | 113.2 |
| 11 | Gowerton^{c} | 1 | Gowerton* | Gowerton village, Penclawdd, Waunarlwydd | 4,928 | 7.55 |
| 12 | Killay North | 1 | Killay* (North ward) | Carnglas, Olchfa and Waunarlwydd | 3,436 | 1.99 |
| 13 | Killay South | 1 | Killay* (South ward) | Dunvant, Ilston, Sketty | 2,297 | 1.24 |
| 14 | Kingsbridge | 1 | Llwchwr* (Garden Village and Kingsbridge wards) | Garden Village, Stafford Common | 4,089 | 4.82 |
| 15 | Landore^{c} | 2 | Landore | Hafod, Landore, Morfa, Plasmarl | 6,121 | 2.23 |
| 16 | Llangyfelach | 1 | Llangyfelach*, Pontlliw* | Pantlasau, Tircoed | 4,426 | 17.12 |
| 17 | Llansamlet | 4 | Llansamlet, Birchgrove | Birchgrove, Glais, Heol Las, Llansamlet, Morriston, Talycoppa, Summerhill and Trallwn | 12,003 | 15.54 |
| 18 | Lower Loughor | 1 | Llwchwr* (Lower Loughor ward) | Loughor | 2,146 | 1.61 |
| 19 | Mawr^{c} | 1 | Mawr* | Felindre, Craigcefnparc, Garnswllt, Ryhdypandy | 1,800 | 57.81 |
| 20 | Mayals | 1 | Mumbles* (Mayals ward) | Blackpill, Mayals, West Cross | 2,834 | 4.52 |
| 21 | Morriston^{c} | 5 | Morriston | Caemawr, Cwmrhydyceirw, Morriston town, Parc Gwernfadog, Pant-lasau, Ynysforgan and Ynystawe | 16,781 | 7.32 |
| 22 | Mynydd-Bach^{c} | 3 | Mynydd-Bach | Clase, Clasemont, Park View Estate, Penfillia Estate, Treboeth, Tirdeunaw, Pinewood, Mynydd Garnlywd and Bryn Rock | 8,756 | 3.57 |
| 23 | Newton | 1 | Mumbles* (Newton ward) | Caswell, Langland Bay | 3,150 | 2.36 |
| 24 | Oystermouth | 1 | Mumbles* (Oystermouth ward) | Norton, Mumbles, Thistleboon | 4,315 | 2.01 |
| 25 | Penclawdd | 1 | Llanrhidian Higher* (Llanmorlais and Penclawdd wards) | Blue Anchor, Llanmorlais, Penclawdd, Crofty and Wernffrwd | 3,672 | 14.3 |
| 26 | Penderry^{c} | 3 | Penderry | Penlan, Portmead, Blaen-y-Maes, Fforesthall and Caereithin | 10,981 | 4.04 |
| 27 | Penllergaer | 1 | Penllergaer* | Penllergaer and part of Gorseinon | 2,434 | 6.01 |
| 28 | Pennard^{c} | 1 | Pennard* | Bishopston, Fairwood Common, Kittle, Parkmill, Southgate | 2,648 | 11.64 |
| 29 | Penyrheol | 2 | Grovesend*, Gorseinon* (Gorseinon West and Penyrheol wards) | Grovesend and Waun Gron | 5,780 | 8.61 |
| 30 | Pontarddulais^{c} | 2 | Pontarddulais* | Pontarddulais town | 5,293 | 15.61 |
| 31 | St. Thomas^{c} | 2 | St. Thomas | Bon-y-maen, Dan-y-graig, Landore, Port Tennant, SA1 Waterfront, Swansea Docks, Kilvey Hill and the Grenfell Park Area, St. Thomas | 6,373 | 5.91 |
| 32 | Sketty^{c} | 5 | Sketty | Carnglas, Clyne Valley (Gwerneinon), Derwen Fawr, Hendrefoilan, Killay, Singleton Park, Sketty village, Tycoch, Cwmgwyn | 13,799 | 6.87 |
| 33 | Townhill^{c} | 3 | Townhill | Cwm-Gwyn, Mayhill, Mount Pleasant, Townhill | 8,443 | 1.8 |
| 34 | Uplands^{c} | 4 | Uplands | Brynmill, St. Helens, Cwmgwyn, Ffynone and The Lons, Uplands | 13,355 | 2.31 |
| 35 | Upper Loughor | 1 | Llwchwr* (Upper Loughor ward) | Loughor | 2,845 | 1.61 |
| 36 | West Cross | 2 | Mumbles* (West Cross ward) | Norton, Mumbles and Newton, West Cross | 6,475 | 2.48 |

* = Communities which elect a community council
^{c} = Ward coterminous with community of the same name

== See also ==
- List of electoral wards in Wales
