= List of places in Swansea =

Map of places in Swansea compiled from this list
See the list of places in Wales for places in other principal areas.

This is a list of cities, towns and villages in the principal area of Swansea, Wales.

== A ==
- Alltwen

== B ==
- Birchgrove, Bishopston, Blackpill, Blaen-Y-Maes, Bolgoed, Bon-y-maen, Brynhyfryd, Brynmelyn, Brynmill, Bryntywod, Burry Green

== C ==
- Cadle, Caemawr, Carnglas, Caswell, Cheriton, Clase, Clydach, Clyne, Cockett, Copley, Craigcefnparc, Crofty, Cwmbwrla, Cwmdu, Cwmfelin, Cwm Gwyn

== D ==
- Danygraig, Derwen Fawr, Dunvant

== E ==
- Enterprise Zone

== F ==
- Fairwood, Fairyhill, Felindre, Fforestfach, Frederick Place

== G ==
- Garden Village, Garnswllt, Gendros, Gorseinon, Gowerton, Graig Trewyddfa, Greenhill, Grovesend

== H ==
- Hafod, Hendrefoilan, Heol-Las, Horton

== I ==
- Ilston

== K ==
- Killay, Kingsbridge, Kittle, Knelston

== L ==
- Landore, Landimore, Langland, Leason, Llandewi, Llangennith, Llangyfelach, Llanmadoc, Llanmorlais, Llanrhidian, Llansamlet, Llethryd, Llewitha, Loughor

== M ==
- Manselton, Maritime Quarter, Mawr, Mayals, Mayhill, Middleton, Morfa, Morriston, Mount Pleasant, Mumbles, Murton, Mynydd-Bach, Mynydd Bach Y Glo

== N ==
- Newton, Nicholaston, Norton, North Hill,

== O ==
- Olchfa, Oldwalls, Overton, Oystermouth, Oxwich, Oxwich Green

== P ==
- Pantlasau, Parkmill, Penclawdd, Peniel Green, Penlan, Peniel Green, Penllergaer, Penmaen, Pennard, Penrice, Pentrebach, Pentrechwyth, Pentre-Dwr, Pentrepoeth, Penyrheol, Pitton, Pitton Green, Plasmarl, Pontarddulais, Pontlliw, Port Eynon, Portmead, Port Tennant, Poundffald

== R ==
- Ravenhill, Reynoldston, Rhydypandy, Rhossili

== S ==
- SA1 Waterfront, Sandfields, Scurlage, Sketty, Sketty Park, Slade, Southgate, St. Thomas, Swansea, Swansea Docks

== T ==
- Thistleboon, Three Crosses, Tirdeunaw, Tircoed forest village, Tirpenry, Townhill, Treboeth, Tycoch

== U ==
- Uplands, Upper Killay

== W ==
- Waunarlwydd, Waun Wen, Wernffrwd, Wernfadog, West Cross, Winch Wen

== Y ==
- Ynysforgan, Ynystawe

== See also ==
- List of places in Swansea (categorised)
