= List of standardised Welsh place-names in Swansea =

Location of the City and County of Swansea in Wales.

The list of standardised Welsh place-names, for places in Swansea, is a list compiled by the Welsh Language Commissioner to recommend the standardisation of the spelling of Welsh place-names, particularly in the Welsh language and when multiple forms are used, although some place-names in English were also recommended to be matched with the Welsh. The list contains 170 entries, as of November 2023.

The list is based on recommendations provided by the Place-names Standardisation Panel, convened by the Commissioner, for expert advice on the standardisation of Welsh place-names. The panel bases their decisions on a set of guidelines (currently dating to June 2023), specific to Welsh settlement names (such as those of villages, towns, and cities) and topographic features (such as lakes, mountains and rivers). The panel does not cover house or building names, although similar principles could be applied to them or to names for new developments (for which the Commissioner offers their own advice to local authorities and housing developers). The panel may also have used additional guidelines.

The list was first published in 2018, and took years to put together. Upon creation, these lists were published under the Open Government Licence 3.0.

== List ==
Recommended standardised names		Not recommended names		Type	Grid reference
Welsh	English	Welsh	English	Type	Grid reference
Aberclydach	Aberclydach			Settlement	SN6801
Abertawe	Swansea			Settlement	SS6592
Bachygwreiddyn	Bachygwreiddyn			Settlement	SN6000
Berry	Berry			Settlement	SS4787
Berth-lwyd	Berth-lwyd			Area	SS5696
Blackpill	Blackpill			Settlement	SS6190
Blue Anchor	Blue Anchor			Settlement	SS5495
Bolgoed	Bolgoed			Area	SN6002
Bôn-y-maen	Bôn-y-maen		Bon-y-maen	Area	SS6895
Brynhyfryd	Brynhyfryd			Settlement	SS6595
Brynmill	Brynmill			Settlement	SS6392
Bryntelych	Bryntelych			Area	SN6002
Burry	Burry			Settlement	SS4590
Burry Green	Burry Green			Settlement	SS4691
Bwlchymynydd	Bwlchymynydd			Settlement	SS5798
Cadle	Cadle			Settlement	SS6297
Cae-mawr (Treforys)	Cae-mawr		Caemawr	Settlement	SS6698
Cae-mawr (Clydach)	Cae-mawr			Settlement	SN6800
Caereithin	Caereithin			Settlement	SS6396
Carn-glas	Carn-glas		Carnglas	Settlement	SS6193
Casllwchwr	Loughor			Settlement	SS5698
Caswell	Caswell			Settlement	SS5987
Cefnhengoed	Cefnhengoed		Cefn Hengoed	Settlement	SS6895
Cefn-y-garth	Cefn-y-garth			Settlement	SN7000
Cheriton	Cheriton			Settlement	SS4593
Cilâ	Killay			Settlement	SS6093
Cilâ Uchaf	Upper Killay			Settlement	SS5892
Cilfái	Kilvey			Area	SS6896
Y Clas	Clase			Settlement	SS6597
Clun-du	Clun-du			Settlement	SS6698
Clwyd Gwilym	Clwyd Gwilym			Settlement	SN7413
Clydach	Clydach			Settlement	SN6901
Coalbrook	Coalbrook			Area	SN5900
Y Cocyd	Cockett			Settlement	SS6294
Craig-cefn-parc	Craig-cefn-parc			Settlement	SN6703
Crofty	Crofty			Settlement	SS5294
Y Crwys	Three Crosses			Settlement	SS5794
Crymlyn Burrows	Crymlyn Burrows			Area	SS7093
Cwmbwrla	Cwmbwrla			Settlement	SS6494
Cwmcerdinen	Cwmcerdinen			Settlement	SN6307
Cwm-du	Cwm-du		Cwmdu	Settlement	SS6494
Cwmdulais	Cwmdulais			Settlement	SN6103
Cwm-felin-fach	Cwm-felin-fach		Cwm-felin-Fach	Settlement	SS6799
Cwmrhydyceirw	Cwmrhydyceirw			Settlement	SS6699
Derwen-fawr	Derwen-fawr		Derwen Fawr	Area	SS6191
Dyfnant	Dunvant	Dynfant		Settlement	SS5993
Faerdre	Vardre			Settlement	SN6901
Fagwyr	Fagwyr			Settlement	SN6702
Fairwood	Fairwood			Area	SS5693
Felindre	Felindre			Settlement	SN6302
Felinfrân	Felinfrân			Settlement	SS6998
Fforest-fach	Fforest-fach		Fforestfach	Settlement	SS6295
Ffynonne	Ffynonne		Ffynone	Settlement	SS6493
Garn-swllt	Garn-swllt		Garnswllt	Settlement	SN6209
Gellifedw	Birchgrove			Settlement	SS7098
Gendros	Gendros			Settlement	SS6395
Y Glais	Y Glais		Glais	Settlement	SN7000
Glandŵr	Landore			Settlement	SS6595
Goetre	Goetre			Area	SS5993
Gorseinon	Gorseinon			Settlement	SS5898
Graigfelen	Graigfelen		Graig Felen	Settlement	SN6801
Graigtrewyddfa	Graigtrewyddfa		Graig Trewyddfa	Settlement	SS6697
Hafod	Hafod			Settlement	SS6594
Heol-las	Heol-las			Settlement	SS6998
Horton	Horton			Settlement	SS4785
Kittle	Kittle			Settlement	SS5789
Landimôr	Landimore			Settlement	SS4693
Langland	Langland			Settlement	SS6087
Leason	Leason			Area	SS4892
Limeslade	Limeslade			Settlement	SS6287
Little Reynoldston	Little Reynoldston			Settlement	SS4889
Llanddewi	Llanddewi			Settlement	SS4689
Llandeilo Ferwallt	Bishopston			Settlement	SS5789
Llangyfelach	Llangyfelach			Settlement	SS6498
Llangynydd	Llangennith			Settlement	SS4291
Llanilltud Gŵyr	Ilston			Settlement	SS5590
Llanmadog	Llanmadog		Llanmadoc	Settlement	SS4493
Llanmorlais	Llanmorlais			Settlement	SS5394
Llanrhidian	Llanrhidian			Settlement	SS4992
Llansamlet	Llansamlet			Settlement	SS6897
Llan-y-tair-mair	Knelston			Settlement	SS4688
Llethryd	Llethryd			Area	SS5391
Lôn-las	Lôn-las			Area	SS7097
Lunnon	Lunnon			Settlement	SS5489
Manselfield	Manselfield			Settlement	SS5988
Mayals	Mayals			Settlement	SS6090
Mayhill	Mayhill			Settlement	SS6494
Middleton	Middleton			Settlement	SS4287
Mount Pleasant	Mount Pleasant			Settlement	SS6593
Murton	Murton			Settlement	SS5889
Y Mwmbwls	Mumbles			Settlement	SS6187
Mynydd-bach	Mynydd-bach		Mynydd-Bach	Settlement	SS6597
Mynydd-bach-y-glo	Mynydd-bach-y-glo			Settlement	SS6195
Newton	Newton			Settlement	SS6088
Nicholaston	Nicholaston			Settlement	SS5288
Norton (Oxwich)	Norton			Settlement	SS4986
Norton (Mumbles)	Norton			Settlement	SS6188
Yr Olchfa	Yr Olchfa			Settlement	SS6193
Oldwalls	Oldwalls			Settlement	SS4891
Oldway	Oldway			Settlement	SS5888
Overton	Overton			Settlement	SS4685
Oxwich	Oxwich			Settlement	SS4986
Pantlasau	Pantlasau			Area	SN6500
Parkmill	Parkmill			Settlement	SS5489
Pen Pyrod	Worm's Head			Topographical feature	SS3887
Pen-clawdd	Pen-clawdd		Penclawdd	Settlement	SS5495
Pengelli	Grovesend			Settlement	SN5900
Peniel Green	Peniel Green			Area	SS6997
Pen-lan	Pen-lan		Penlan	Settlement	SS6496
Penlle'r-gaer	Penlle'r-gaer		Penllergaer	Settlement	SS6198
Pen-maen	Pen-maen		Penmaen	Settlement	SS5388
Pennard	Pennard			Settlement	SS5688
Pen-rhys	Penrice			Settlement	SS4987
Pentre-bach	Pentre-bach		Pentrebach	Settlement	SN6005
Pentre-chwyth	Pentre-chwyth		Pentrechwyth	Settlement	SS6695
Pentredŵr	Pentredŵr		Pentre Dwr	Settlement	SS6996
Pentre-poeth	Pentre-poeth			Settlement	SS6698
Pentre'r-ardd	Garden Village			Settlement	SS5997
Pentre'rgaseg	Pentre'rgaseg			Settlement	SS6795
Pen-y-dre	Pen-y-dre		Penydre	Settlement	SN6902
Penyrheol	Penyrheol			Settlement	SS5899
Penyrheol	Penyrheol			Area	SS6192
Pitton	Pitton			Settlement	SS4287
Plas-marl	Plas-marl		Plasmarl	Settlement	SS6696
Pontarddulais	Pontarddulais			Settlement	SN5903
Pont-lliw	Pont-lliw		Pontlliw	Settlement	SN6101
Pontybrenin	Kingsbridge			Settlement	SS5897
Port Tennant	Port Tennant			Settlement	SS6893
Portmead	Portmead			Settlement	SS6396
Poundffald	Poundffald			Settlement	SS5694
Pwll-du	Pwll-du		Pwlldu	Settlement	SS5787
Reynoldston	Reynoldston			Settlement	SS4890
Rhosili	Rhosili		Rhossili	Settlement	SS4188
Rhyd-y-gwin	Rhyd-y-gwin			Settlement	SN6703
Rhydypandy	Rhydypandy			Area	SN6601
Rhyndwyglydach	Rhyndwyglydach			Parish	SN6805
Scurlage	Scurlage			Settlement	SS4687
Sgeti	Sketty			Settlement	SS6292
Sgeti Isaf	Lower Sketty			Settlement	SS6191
Singleton	Singleton			Settlement	SS6292
Southgate	Southgate			Settlement	SS5588
St Thomas	St Thomas			Settlement	SS6693
Taironnen	Taironnen			Area	SN6503
Tai'rysgol	Tai'rysgol			Settlement	SS6997
Tircanol	Tircanol			Settlement	SS6798
Tirdeunaw	Tirdeunaw			Settlement	SS6597
Tirpenry	Tirpenry			Area	SS6798
Townhill	Townhill			Settlement	SS6393
Trallwn	Trallwn			Settlement	SS6996
Tre-boeth	Tre-boeth		Treboeth	Settlement	SS6596
Trefansel	Manselton			Settlement	SS6595
Treforys	Morriston			Settlement	SS6698
Tre-gof	Tre-gof			Settlement	SS6998
Tregŵyr	Gowerton			Settlement	SS5996
Trewyddfa	Trewyddfa			Area	SS6697
Tŷ-coch	Tŷ-coch		Tycoch	Settlement	SS6293
Tŷ-draw	Tŷ-draw			Settlement	SS6894
Tyn-y-cwm	Tyn-y-cwm			Settlement	SN6202
Uplands	Uplands			Settlement	SS6392
Waunarlwydd	Waunarlwydd			Settlement	SS6095
Waun-gron	Waun-gron			Settlement	SN5902
Waun-gron	Waun-gron			Settlement	SS6596
Waun-wen	Waun-wen		Waun Wen	Area	SS6594
Wernffrwd	Wernffrwd			Settlement	SS5194
Wernolau	Wernolau			Settlement	SS5695
West Cross	West Cross			Settlement	SS6189
Winsh-wen	Winsh-wen		Winsh-Wen	Settlement	SS6896
Ynysforgan	Ynysforgan			Settlement	SS6799
Ynystawe	Ynystawe			Settlement	SN6800
Ystumllwynarth	Oystermouth			Settlement	SS6188
