= List of places in Swansea (categorised) =

This is a list of places in the City and County of Swansea, South Wales.

== Administrative divisions ==
=== Communities ===
- Birchgrove
- Bishopston
- Bonymaen
- Castle
- Clydach
- Cockett
- Cwmbwrla
- Dunvant
- Gorseinon
- Gowerton
- Grovesend and Waungron
- Ilston
- Killay
- Landore
- Llangennith, Llanmadoc and Cheriton
- Llangyfelach
- Llanrhidian Higher
- Llanrhidian Lower
- Llansamlet
- Llwchwr
- Mawr
- Morriston
- Mumbles
- Mynydd-Bach
- Penderry
- Penllergaer
- Pennard
- Penrice
- Pontarddulais
- Pontlliw and Tircoed
- Port Eynon
- Reynoldston
- Rhossili
- Sketty
- St Thomas
- Three Crosses
- Townhill
- Uplands
- Upper Killay

== Towns ==
- Gorseinon
- Loughor
- Morriston
- Pontarddulais
- Penllergaer

== Prehistoric sites ==
- Carreg Bica
- Bulwark Hillfort, The
- Burry Holms Chapel
- Cefn Bryn
- Sweynes Howes
- Parc Cwm long cairn

== Geographical ==
=== Beaches ===
There are over seventy named beaches in the Swansea area. Some of the larger beaches have seaside resort amenities and are easily accessible by road. For those seeking more adventure and tranquillity there are some beaches that are only accessible on foot by trekking over cliffs or through farmland.

This is a list of the larger, more well-known beaches:

- Bracelet Bay
- Broughton Bay
- Brandy Cove
- Caswell Bay
- Fall Bay
- Langland Bay
- Limeslade Bay
- Mewslade Bay
- Oxwich Bay
- Port Eynon Bay
- Pwlldu Bay
- Rhossili Bay
- Slade Bay
- Swansea Bay
- Three Cliffs Bay

=== Rivers and waterways ===
- Blackpill stream
- Lower Clydach River
- Upper Clydach River
- Dulais
- Glan-y-wern Canal
- River Ilston
- Afon Llan
- Afon Lliw
- River Loughor
- River Tawe
- Tennant Canal
- Swansea Canal

=== Lakes and reservoirs ===
- Brynmill Park lake
- Lake Fendrod
- Lower Lliw reservoir
- Upper Lliw reservoir

=== Mountains and hills ===
- Bryn Carnglas
- Cefn Hengoed
- Colts Hill
- Kilvey Hill
- Mumbles Hill
- Mynydd-Bach
- Mynydd y Betws
- Mynydd y Gwair
- Townhill

=== Country parks ===
- Clyne Valley Country Park
- Kilvey Community Woodland
- Lliw Reservoirs country park
- Penllergaer

=== Nature reserves ===
- Broad Pool
- Crymlyn Bog nature reserve
- Crymlyn Burrows
- Kilvey Community Woodland
- Rosehill Quarry
- Swansea Vale

=== Geographical interest ===
- Gower Peninsula
- Cefn Bryn
- Burry Holms
- Lower Swansea valley

== Retail parks ==
- Parc Fforestfach, Fforestfach
- Morfa Retail Park, Landore
- Parc Tawe
- Pontarddulais Road Retail Park, Fforestfach
- Swansea Enterprise Park

== Industrial estates and business parks ==
- Swansea Enterprise Park and Swansea Vale
- Swansea West Business Park
- Carmarthen Road
- Garngoch Industrial Estate, Gorseinon
- Gorseinon Business Park, Gorseinon
- Kingsbridge Business Park, Gorseinon
- Crofty Industrial Estate, Penclawdd
- Pontarddulais Estate, Pontarddulais
- Players Field Industrial Estate, Clydach
- Morfa Industrial Estate, Morfa
- Millbrook Yard & Estate, Landore
- Morfa Road Industrial Estate, Hafod
- SA1 Swansea Waterfront
- Penllergaer Business Park, Penllergaer
- Felindre

== Farmers' markets ==
- Clydach Local Produce Market, Clydach (last Saturday each month)
- Grovesend Local Producers Market, Grovesend (fourth Saturday each month)
- Mumbles Farmers Market, Mumbles (second Saturday each month)
- Penclawdd Local Produce Market, Penclawdd (third Saturday each month)
- Pontarddulais Local Produce Market, Pontarddulais (second Wednesday each month)
- Sketty Local Produce Market, Sketty (first Saturday each month)
- Waterfront Local Produce Market, Maritime Quarter (first Sunday each month)

== Urban parks ==
- Brynmill Park
- Cwmdonkin Park, Uplands
- Llewellyn Park, Treboeth
- Singleton Park, Sketty
- Victoria Park

== Transport ==
=== Primary roads ===
- Fabian Way (A483 road)
- M4 motorway (Junctions 44 to 47)

=== Bus ===
- Gorseinon bus station
- Pontarddulais bus station
- Swansea bus station

=== Railway lines ===
- Heart of Wales line
- South Wales Main Line (terminus)
- Swansea District line (freight route)
- West Wales lines (terminus)

=== Railway stations ===
- Gowerton railway station
- Llansamlet railway station
- Pontarddulais railway station
- Swansea railway station

=== Cycle routes ===
- NCR 4
- NCR 43

=== Shipping ===
- Swansea Docks (cargo)
- Swansea Marina (leisure boats)
- River Loughor
- River Tawe (leisure boats)

=== Airports ===
- Swansea Airport

== See also ==
- Lists of places in Wales
- List of buildings and structures in Swansea
- List of cultural venues in Swansea
