= List of cultural venues in Swansea =

This is a list of cultural venues in the City and County of Swansea, Wales.

== Sport ==
=== Stadia ===
List of stadiums with seating capacity:

- Liberty Stadium (20,280)
- St Helens Rugby and Cricket Ground (10,500)
- Pryderi Park Stadium

=== Indoor venues ===
- Landore Bowls Stadium

=== Playing fields ===
- King George V Playing Field, Sketty
- Stafford Common

=== Golf courses ===
- Clyne Golf Club, Mayals
- Fairwood Park Golf Course, Fairwood Common
- Gower Golf Club, Gowerton
- Inco Golf Course, Clydach
- Langland Bay Golf Course, Oystermouth
- Pennard Golf Course, Pennard
- Morriston Golf Course, Morriston

=== Leisure centres ===
- Bishopston Sports Centre
- Cefn Hengoed Leisure Centre, Llansamlet
- City of Swansea Gymnastics Club
- Morriston Leisure Centre
- Olchfa Pool
- Penlan Leisure Centre
- Pentrehafod Sports Hall and Pool
- Penyrheol Leisure Centre
- Pontarddulais Community Leisure Centre
- Wales National Pool, Sketty
- Swansea Leisure Centre
- Swansea University Sports Centre

== Performing arts ==
List of performing arts venues and their seating capacities:

- Albert Hall (800)
- Swansea Arena (3,500)
- Guildhall
  - Brangwyn Hall (1,070)
  - George Hall (200)
  - Lord Mayor's Reception Room (30-130)
- Dylan Thomas Centre (110)
- Dylan Thomas Theatre (144)
- Grand Theatre
  - Main Theatre (1,000)
  - Arts Wing (175)
- Great Hall, Swansea University (700)
- Patti Pavilion (900)
- Penyrheol Theatre (500)
- Taliesin Arts Centre (330) Official Site
- YMCA Theatre

=== Choral venues ===
- Tabernacle Chapel, Morriston (3,000)

=== Open-air venues ===
- Castle Square, city centre
- Singleton Park, Sketty
- Felindre, venue for the 2006 National Eisteddfod of Wales

== Historic and architectural venues ==
This is a list of historic and architectural places and their use as a cultural venue:

- Oystermouth Castle (Shakespeare performances)

== Museums and art galleries ==
- 1940s Swansea Bay, Crymlyn Burrows
- Attic Gallery, Maritime Quarter
- Dylan Thomas Centre
- Egypt Centre, University of Wales, Swansea
- Elysium Gallery
- Glynn Vivian Art Gallery
- Gower Heritage Centre
- Mission Gallery, Maritime Quarter
- National Waterfront Museum (until 2005, the Maritime and Industrial Museum)
- Swansea Museum

== Places of worship ==
These are a few of the places of worship in Swansea, many of them in the city centre:

- Cathedral Church of Saint Joseph, Greenhill (Roman Catholic)
- City Church Swansea Dyfatty St SA1 1QQ (Pentecostal)

Dharmavajra Buddhist Centre, Uplands (Buddhist)

- Ebenezer Baptist Church (Evangelical)
- High Street Unitarian Church, Swansea (Unitarianism)
- Kafel Centre, (Racial Attacks and Harassment Monitoring Association)
- Kingdom Hall of Jehovah's Witnesses, Uplands (Jehovah's Witnesses)
- Mount Pleasant Baptist Church (Evangelical)
- Pantygwydr Baptist Church (Baptist)
- St. Benedict's, Sketty (Roman Catholic)
- St. David's Priory (Roman Catholic)
- St Gabriel's, Brynmill (Church in Wales (Anglican))
- St. Mary's Church (Church in Wales (Anglican))
- St. Paul's Church, Sketty (Church in Wales (Anglican))
- Sketty Methodist Church, (Methodist)
- Waterfront Community Church (Apostolic)

== See also ==
- List of places in Wales
- List of places in Swansea
