= 1995 City and County of Swansea Council election =

1995 Welsh local government election

The first election to the City and County of Swansea Council was held on 4 May 1995. It was followed by the 1999 election. On the same day there were elections to the other 21 local authorities in Wales and community councils in Wales.

== Overview ==
All council seats were up for election. These were the first elections held following local government reorganisation and the abolition of West Glamorgan County Council. The ward boundaries for the new authority were based on the previous Lliw Valley Borough Council and Swansea City Council although the number of members elected for individual wards was reduced. Conservative candidates were heavily defeated.

City and County of Swansea Council election result 1995
Party	Seats	Gains	Losses	Net gain/loss	Seats %	Votes %	Votes	+/−
Labour	57							
Independent	7							
Liberal Democrats	6							
Conservative	1							
Plaid Cymru	0							
Green	0							
Plaid dros Gymru	1						511	

== Candidates ==
Most sitting members of West Glamorgan County council sought election to the new authority. A number were also members of the previous district councils but others contested a ward against a sitting district councillor.

== Results by ward ==
=== Bishopston (one seat) ===
Bishopston 1995
Party	Candidate	Votes	%	±%
Liberal Democrats	Fred T. Hughes*	641		
Independent	Keith Edmund Marsh	582		
Labour	C.E. Lowit	164		
Turnout				
Liberal Democrats win (new seat)				

=== Bonymaen (two seats) ===
Bonymaen 1995
Party	Candidate	Votes	%	±%
Labour	Mair Eluned Gibbs	1,185		
Labour	David Watkins	1,044		
Liberal Democrats	Brian Charles Thomas	186		
Liberal Democrats	Trevor Warden	140		
Turnout				
Labour win (new seat)				
Labour win (new seat)				

=== Castle (three seats) ===
Castle 1995
Party	Candidate	Votes	%	±%
Labour	Robert Alan Lloyd	1,756		
Labour	Barbara Joyce Hynes	1,723		
Labour	Dereck John Roberts	1,623		
Liberal Democrats	Robert Speht	592		
Green	Benjamin David Grigg	515		
Liberal Democrats	Cynthia Wharrad	463		
Wales Militant Labour	Mark Evans	378		
Turnout				
Labour win (new seat)				
Labour win (new seat)				
Labour win (new seat)				

=== Clydach (one seat) ===
Clydach 1995
Party	Candidate	Votes	%	±%
Labour	Bryan Edwin Ayres	540		
Plaid Cymru	James Vernon Davies	351		
Turnout				
Labour win (new seat)				

=== Cockett (four seats) ===
Cockett 1995
Party	Candidate	Votes	%	±%
Labour	Lilian Maud Hopkin	2,414		
Labour	Victor Cyril Alexander	2,194		
Labour	David Anthony	2,104		
Labour	Denzil Porter	1,953		
Plaid Cymru	David Rhys Lloyd	1,240		
Liberal Democrats	Stuart Ball	458		
Liberal Democrats	Ken Shingleton	411		
Liberal Democrats	Philip Stanford	409		
Liberal Democrats	Arthur Westwood	316		
Conservative	Timothy Mark Phillips	286		
Turnout				
Labour win (new seat)				
Labour win (new seat)				
Labour win (new seat)				
Labour win (new seat)				

=== Cwmbwrla (two seats) ===
Cwmbwrla 1995
Party	Candidate	Votes	%	±%
Liberal Democrats	Peter Malcolm Black	2,130		
Liberal Democrats	Christopher Ashleigh Holley	1,947		
Labour	John James	808		
Labour	Wayne Beard	782		
Conservative	Sarah John	75		
Turnout				
Liberal Democrats win (new seat)				
Liberal Democrats win (new seat)				

=== Dulais East (one seat) ===
Dulais East 1995
Party	Candidate	Votes	%	±%
Labour	Phil Downing	409		
Independent	Cled Morgan	338		
Turnout				
Labour win (new seat)				

=== Dunvant (one seat) ===
Dunvant 1995
Party	Candidate	Votes	%	±%
Labour	Veronica Wood	784		
Liberal Democrats	John Newbury	751		
Conservative	Bob Simmonds	123		
Turnout				
Labour win (new seat)				

=== Fairwood (one seat) ===
Fairwood 1995
Party	Candidate	Votes	%	±%
Independent	John Gunther Bushell*	566		
Labour	R.B. Hart	286		
Conservative	J.G. Bennett	124		
Turnout				
Independent win (new seat)				

=== Gorseinon Central (one seat) ===
Gorseinon Central 1995
Party	Candidate	Votes	%	±%
Labour	Morlais Thomas	Unopposed		
Labour win (new seat)				

=== Gorseinon East (one seat) ===
Gorseinon East 1995
Party	Candidate	Votes	%	±%
Labour	Glyn Seabourne	Unopposed		
Labour win (new seat)				

=== Gower (one seat) ===
Gower 1995
Party	Candidate	Votes	%	±%
Independent	Richard David Lewis*	601		
Liberal Democrats	H.W. Evans	485		
Labour	N. Davies	204		
Conservative	L.D. Morgan	139		
Turnout				
Independent win (new seat)				

=== Gowerton East (one seat) ===
Gowerton East 1995
Party	Candidate	Votes	%	±%
Labour	Ronald Morgan Thomas	371		
Conservative	Peter Davies	278		
Liberal Democrats	Chris Stockton	63		
Turnout				
Labour hold		Swing		

=== Gowerton West (one seat) ===
Gowerton West 1995
Party	Candidate	Votes	%	±%
Labour	Harry Thomas	494		
Conservative	Lyndon Jones	271		
Liberal Democrats	Robert Dickens	72		
Turnout				
Labour hold		Swing		

=== Killay North (one seat) ===
Killay North 1995
Party	Candidate	Votes	%	±%
Labour	Perry Stephen Buck	507		
Conservative	Goorge Smith Gunn*	409		
Liberal Democrats	P.S. Bushell	331		
Turnout				
Labour hold		Swing		

=== Killay South (one seat) ===
Killay South 1995
Party	Candidate	Votes	%	±%
Liberal Democrats	Gerald Glyn Clement	548		
Labour	R.S. Johnson	301		
Conservative	P. Williams*	220		
Turnout				
Liberal Democrats hold		Swing		

=== Kingsbridge (two seats) ===
Kingsbridge 1995
Party	Candidate	Votes	%	±%
Labour	William Gethin Evans	991		
Labour	Len Howell	850		
Liberal Democrats	Claire Barker	315		
Labour hold		Swing		
Labour hold		Swing		

=== Landore (two seats) ===
Landore 1995
Party	Candidate	Votes	%	±%
Labour	Holland William Ayres	1,062		
Labour	Derek Herbert Cox	1,000		
Liberal Democrats	Eric Chapman	400		
Liberal Democrats	Caroline Freeman	373		
Independent	Norman Gates	221		
Independent Labour	Dai John	172		
Labour hold		Swing		
Labour hold		Swing		

=== Llangyfelach (two seats) ===
Llangyfelach 1995
Party	Candidate	Votes	%	±%
Independent	David Gareth Sullivan	866		
Independent	Audrey R.A. Clement	772		
Labour	Aneurin Rees	490		
Labour	John Martin	343		
Independent win (new seat)				
Independent win (new seat)				

=== Llansamlet (three seats) ===
Llansamlet 1995
Party	Candidate	Votes	%	±%
Labour	Lawrence David Bailey	1,647		
Labour	June Evans	1,636		
Labour	Paul Lloyd	1,492		
Liberal Democrats	George Jowett	296		
Liberal Democrats	Caroline Spooner	266		
Liberal Democrats	Valerie Sullivan	252		
Labour win (new seat)				
Labour win (new seat)				
Labour win (new seat)				

=== Lower Loughor (one seat) ===
Lower Loughor 1995
Party	Candidate	Votes	%	±%
Labour	Daniel Raymond James	480		
Independent	Ritchie Evans	138		
Liberal Democrats	Diana Barker	66		
Labour win (new seat)				

=== Mawr (one seat) ===
Mawr 1995
Party	Candidate	Votes	%	±%
Plaid dros Gymru	Ioan Merritt Richard	511		
Labour	Fred Wilson	225		
Independent	Alun Lewis	73		
Plaid dros Gymru win (new seat)				

=== Mayals (one seat) ===
Mayals 1995
Party	Candidate	Votes	%	±%
Liberal Democrats	Beryl Marshall	529		
Conservative	Paul Valerio	260		
Independent	David Charles Evans	219		
Labour	Bob Sykes	172		
Liberal Democrats hold		Swing		

=== Morriston (four seats) ===
Morriston 1995
Party	Candidate	Votes	%	±%
Labour	Robert Francis-Davies	2,952		
Labour	William John F. Davies	2,886		
Labour	Michael John Hedges	2,875		
Labour	Robert John Lloyd	2,836		
Liberal Democrats	Michael Cunningham	825		
Liberal Democrats	David Saunders	753		
Liberal Democrats	Rebecca Storey	561		
Conservative	James Draper	390		
Labour win (new seat)				
Labour win (new seat)				
Labour win (new seat)				
Labour win (new seat)				

=== Mynyddbach (three seats) ===
Mynyddbach 1995
Party	Candidate	Votes	%	±%
Labour	Ceinwen Thomas	2,382		
Labour	Doreen Jones	2,259		
Labour	Byron George Owen	2,209		
Liberal Democrats	Michael Farrington	428		
Liberal Democrats	Ted Spooner	385		
Liberal Democrats	Cynthia Rix	360		
Labour win (new seat)				
Labour win (new seat)				
Labour win (new seat)				

=== Newton (one seat) ===
Newton 1995
Party	Candidate	Votes	%	±%
Liberal Democrats	Susan Mary Waller	733		
Conservative	Rod Dove	282		
Labour	David Harris	220		
Liberal Democrats hold		Swing		

=== Oystermouth (one seat) ===
Oystermouth 1995
Party	Candidate	Votes	%	±%
Conservative	Joan Thyrza Peters	441		
Labour	Chris Stilwell	379		
Liberal Democrats	Stephen Evans	337		
Independent	Malcolm Prosser	173		
Conservative win (new seat)				

=== Penclawdd (one seat) ===
Penclawdd 1995
Party	Candidate	Votes	%	±%
Independent	Howard John Morgan	unopposed		
Independent win (new seat)				

=== Penderry (four seats) ===
Penderry 1995
Party	Candidate	Votes	%	±%
Labour	Trevor Burtonshaw	1,696		
Labour	Grenville Phillips	1,692		
Labour	Tom Jones	1,678		
Labour	June Elizabeth Burtonshaw	1,672		
Liberal Democrats	Sarah Bellow	309		
Liberal Democrats	Arran John Coole	285		
Liberal Democrats	Kerry Rix	256		
Labour win (new seat)				
Labour win (new seat)				
Labour win (new seat)				
Labour win (new seat)				

=== Penllergaer (one seat) ===
Penllergaer 1995
Party	Candidate	Votes	%	±%
Labour	Dennis Lawlor	489	59.2	
Independent	D. Morgan	337	40.8	
Labour win (new seat)				

=== Pennard (one seat) ===
Pennard 1995
Party	Candidate	Votes	%	±%
Independent	Margaret Smith*	911		
Labour	Mark C. Child	293		
Independent win (new seat)				

=== Penyrheol (two seats) ===
Penyrheol 1995
Party	Candidate	Votes	%	±%
Labour	David Thomas Vernon Davies	Unopposed		
Labour	David Islwyn Elfed Jones	Unopposed		
Labour win (new seat)				
Labour win (new seat)				

=== Pontarddulais (one seat) ===
Pontarddulais 1995
Party	Candidate	Votes	%	±%
Labour	Gareth Williams	615		
Independent	Byron Lewis	171		
Labour win (new seat)				

=== Sketty (four seats) ===
Sketty 1995
Party	Candidate	Votes	%	±%
Independent	Rosina June Stanton	2,959		
Labour	Mehar Chand Verma	1,944		
Labour	Gordon Carruthers	1,794		
Labour	Clive Morgan	1,764		
Labour	Bob Davies	1,707		
Conservative	Bob Massey-Shaw	1,634		
Conservative	John Philip Glew	1,560		
Conservative	Alan Preece	1,430		
Liberal Democrats	Mike Day	1,373		
Conservative	Thomas Huw Rees	1,338		
Liberal Democrats	Elwyn Jones	1,059		
Liberal Democrats	Roger Thomas	845		
Liberal Democrats	Les Wharrad	621		
Independent win (new seat)				
Labour win (new seat)				
Labour win (new seat)				
Labour win (new seat)				

=== St Thomas (two seats) ===
St Thomas 1995
Party	Candidate	Votes	%	±%
Labour	Cyril Johnstone	1,401		
Labour	Alan Richards	1,303		
Wales Militant Labour	Ronnie Job	401		
Wales Militant Labour	Roy Davies	310		
Liberal Democrats	Kevin Parry	158		
Liberal Democrats	Nick Barlow	116		
Labour win (new seat)				
Labour win (new seat)				

=== Talybont (one seat) ===
Talybont 1995
Party	Candidate	Votes	%	±%
Labour	John Treharne Miles	528		
Independent	Owen Leroy Evans	334		
Labour win (new seat)				

=== Townhill (two seats) ===
Townhill 1995
Party	Candidate	Votes	%	±%
Labour	Tyssul Lewis	1,538		
Labour	David Hopkins	1,391		
Liberal Democrats	Beryl Edwards	703		
Liberal Democrats	Bob Taylor	430		
Wales Militant Labour	Dave Warren	149		
Labour win (new seat)				
Labour win (new seat)				

=== Uplands (four seats) ===
Uplands 1995
Party	Candidate	Votes	%	±%
Labour	Bill Richards	2,083		
Labour	David Phillips	2,007		
Labour	Nortridge Perrott	1,994		
Labour	Maureen Stuckey	1,879		
Conservative	Dick Phillips	1,596		
Conservative	Jean Taverner	1,431		
Conservative	Brian Hill-Mackintosh	1,202		
Conservative	Paul Tate	1,179		
Green	David Howells	565		
Liberal Democrats	Lilian Pritchard	495		
Liberal Democrats	Robert Ackland	412		
Liberal Democrats	Beverley Dugdale	395		
Liberal Democrats	Dave Morris	384		
Natural Law	Tim Rees	139		
Labour win (new seat)				
Labour win (new seat)				
Labour win (new seat)				
Labour win (new seat)				

=== Upper Loughor (two seats) ===
Upper Loughor 1995
Party	Candidate	Votes	%	±%
Labour	Gordon Dennis	653		
Labour	David Evans	632		
Independent	William John Griffiths	281		
Liberal Democrats	Linda Evans	151		
Labour win (new seat)				
Labour win (new seat)				

=== Vardre (one seat) ===
Vardre 1995
Party	Candidate	Votes	%	±%
Labour	Graham Cadwallader	567		
Plaid Cymru	Ieuan Owen	160		
Labour win (new seat)				

=== West Cross (two seats) ===
West Cross 1995
Party	Candidate	Votes	%	±%
Labour	Martin Caton	1,539		
Labour	Des Thomas	1,475		
Conservative	Lynne Davies	649		
Liberal Democrats	Chris Davies	349		
Liberal Democrats	Evelyn Pope	304		
Labour win (new seat)				
Labour win (new seat)				
