= Clyne Valley Country Park =

Country park in Swansea, Wales

Coordinates: 51.6036°N 4.0068°W

Clyne Valley Country Park (Welsh: Parc Gwledig Dyffryn Clun) is country park in Swansea, south Wales. It lies on either side of the valley of the Clyne River and comprises an area of over 700 acres (280 ha) of land running from the sea at Blackpill, Swansea, inland to Gowerton. It is an area of once splendid woodland with enormous beech, ash and oak trees mainly on the Mumbles side of the Clyne River, and, on the Swansea side, woods and mainly scrub land that has naturally regenerated a reclaimed refuse tip. The valley forms an important link in the ecological corridor that runs from the Brecon Beacons and the Black Mountain across commons and on into the Gower AONB. The Area of Outstanding Natural Beauty forms part of the valley's boundary along Clyne Common. Now dormant – apart from the rich habitat that has formed from neglect – the valley at one time was part of the Vivian estate. During the eighteenth and nineteenth centuries it was a highly active industrial area with a long history of coal mining, mineral workings, brick making, charcoal burning, railways and canals.

== Clyne Valley Community Project ==
The Clyne Valley Community Project (CVCP) is a grass roots project that has grown out of community concern that the valley, a valuable local resource and a part of the local heritage, is neglected and under-used. The aims of the project are:

- To improve access to the Clyne Valley by clearing and restoring a network of once used tracks and paths.
- To develop and encourage the use of the valley as a community resource by organising events and developing and supporting a wide range of activities in which the communities around the valley can participate.
- To encourage and promote biodiversity and to protect and enhance the natural habitat of species.
- To discover, explore and record evidence of the historical heritage of the valley

== Cycling in the Park ==
A cycle track crosses the centre of the valley, linking Blackpill on Swansea Bay with the inland village of Gowerton. It forms part of National Cycle Route 4 and passes close to the settlements of Killay and Dunvant. The route of the cycle track was once used by the Heart of Wales Line. Past industrial use is still evident along the track.

The wooded hillsides of the Clyne Valley have numerous dirt trails, used for mountain biking and walks.

In 2009 Swansea Council launched the Clyne Valley Management Plan to develop the use of the valley for leisure activities. The plan is grant-funded through the Forestry Commission's 'Better Woodlands for Wales' scheme, and includes a substantial investment into Mountain Bike facilities in Clyne. Several kilometres of new purpose-built way-marked mountain bike trails are being constructed as part of the plan. The Clyne Riders group has been specially constituted for this task.
