= Bon-y-maen (electoral ward) =

Coordinates: 51.64726°N 3.90925°W

Bon-y-maen Ward
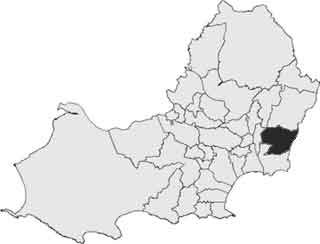
- Area: 8.47 km^{2} (3.27 sq mi)
- Population: 6,857 (2011 census)
  - Density: 810/km^{2} (2,100/sq mi)
- Principal area: Swansea
- Preserved county: West Glamorgan
- Country: Wales
- Sovereign state: United Kingdom
- UK Parliament: Swansea East
- Senedd Cymru – Welsh Parliament: Swansea East
- Councillors: Paul Lloyd (Labour); Mandy Evans (Labour)

Bon-y-maen (until 2022 Bonymaen) is an electoral ward in the City and County of Swansea, Wales, UK.

The ward is bounded by Neath Port Talbot county borough to the east and the Swansea wards of Llansamlet and Morriston to the north; St. Thomas to the south; and Landore to the west.

For the purposes of elections Bon-y-maen is divided into several polling districts: Winch Wen, Pentre Dwr, Hanover Square and Pentrechwyth. Bon-y-maen returns 2 councillors to the local council. The current councillors are Mandy Evans and Paul Lloyd (both Labour Party).

The electoral ward consists of some or all of the following areas: Bon-y-maen, Cefn Hengoed, Copper Quarter, Crymlyn Bog, Morfa, Pentrechwyth, Pentre Dwr, Winch Wen, in the parliamentary constituency of Swansea East.

== Election results ==
=== 2017 Swansea Council election ===
Bonymaen 2017
Party	Candidate	Votes	%	±%
Labour	Mandy Evans*	1,050		
Labour	Paul Lloyd*	1,010		
Plaid Cymru	Geraint Couch	249		
Conservative	Elaine Hughes	227		
Conservative	Wendy Olsen	210		
Turnout		2,746	29	−3.3
Labour hold		Swing		
Labour hold		Swing		

=== 2012 Swansea Council election ===
Bonymaen Ward (2 seats), 2012
Party	Candidate	Votes	%	±%
Labour	Paul Lloyd	959	32.49	
Labour	Mandy Evans	893	30.26	
Independent	Mair Gibbs*	514	17.41%	−26.56
Independent	John Hague*	493	16.70	−20.63
National Front	Sion Owens	92	3.11	−15.57
Majority				
Turnout		2,951	32	

=== 2008 Swansea Council election ===
Bonymaen Ward (2 seats), 2008
Party	Candidate	Votes	%	±%
Labour	Mair Gibbs*	1,052	43.97	
Independent	John Hague*	893	37.33	
BNP	Sion Owens	447	18.68	
Labour hold		Swing		
Independent hold		Swing		
Turnout		2,392		

=== 2004 Swansea Council election ===
Bonymaen 2004
Party	Candidate	Votes	%	±%
Independent	John Hague*	1,093		
Labour	Mair Gibbs*	936		
Plaid Cymru	Philip Couch	386		
Liberal Democrats	Vivienne Samuel	224		
Independent hold		Swing		
Labour hold		Swing		

=== 1999 Swansea Council election ===
At a by-election an Independent candidate captured the seat from Labour and held it at the next election in 1999.

Bonymaen 1999
Party	Candidate	Votes	%	±%
Independent	John Hague*	1,246		
Labour	Mair Gibbs*	1,240		
Labour	Wyndham Davies	632		
Liberal Democrats	Nora O'Sullivan	311		
Independent hold		Swing		
Labour hold		Swing		

=== 1995 Swansea Council election ===
The first election to the new unitary City and County of Swansea Council took place in 1995. Both seats were won by Labour.

Bonymaen 1995
Party	Candidate	Votes	%	±%
Labour	Mair Gibbs	1,185		
Labour	David Watkins	1,044		
Liberal Democrats	Brian Thomas	186		
Liberal Democrats	Trevor Warden	140		
Labour win (new seat)				
Labour win (new seat)				
