= Pluck Lake =

Lake in Morfa, Swansea, Wales

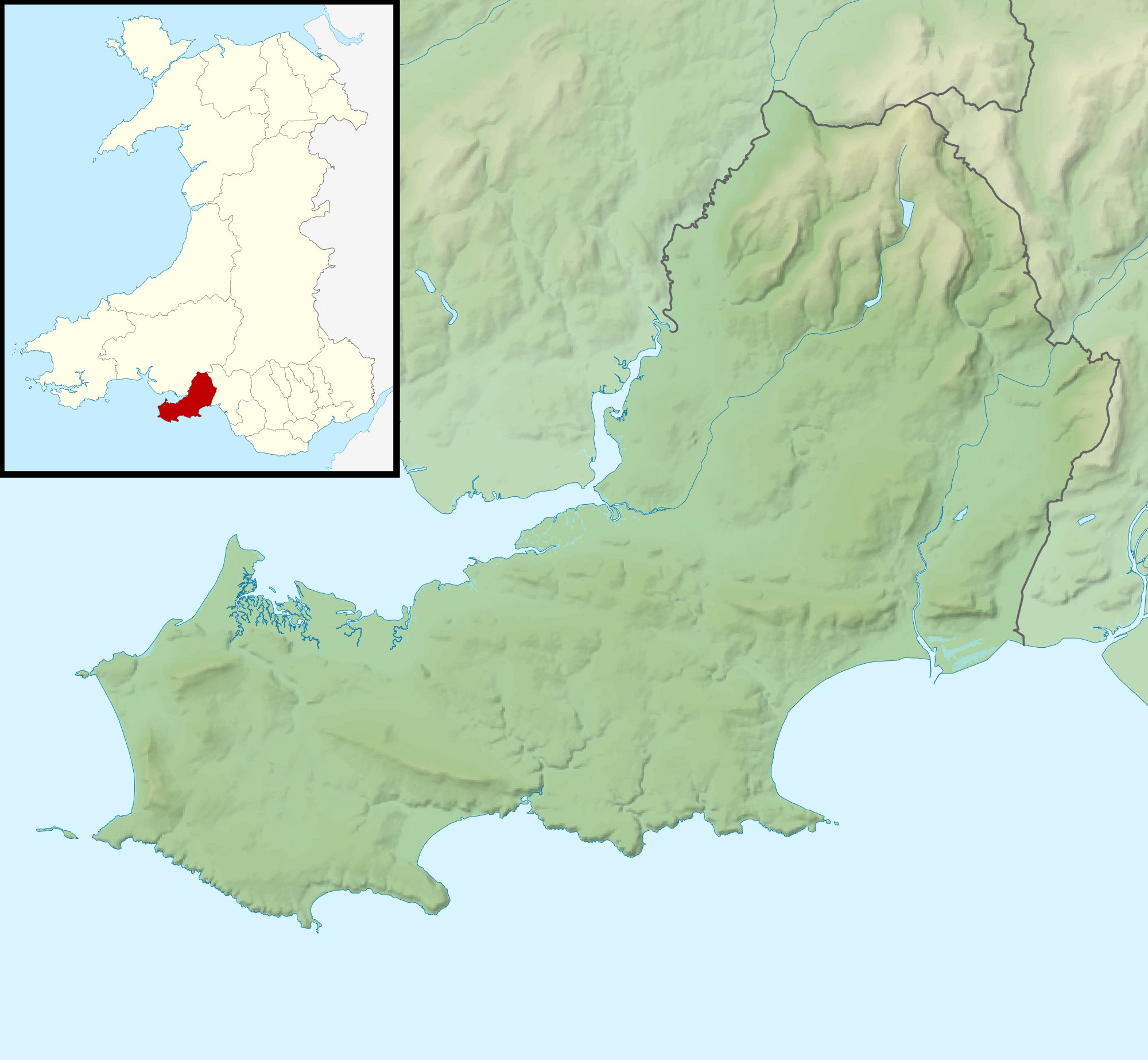
- Location within Swansea
- Location: Morfa, Swansea, Wales
- Coordinates: 51°38′40″N 3°55′29″W
- Basin countries: United Kingdom

Pluck Lake is a lake to the east of Swansea city centre in the Morfa area north of Kilvey Hill. It forms part of Kilvey Community Woodland. Pluck Lake, is a refuge for blue-tailed damselfly and the emperor dragonfly. In April 2008 a crocodile was supposedly sighted in the waters of the lake attracting some attention from the media and members from The Centre for Fortean Zoology and was nicknamed the Morfadile or Pluck Ness Monster.
