= Morriston (electoral ward) =

Coordinates: 51.66475°N 3.93890°W

Morriston Ward
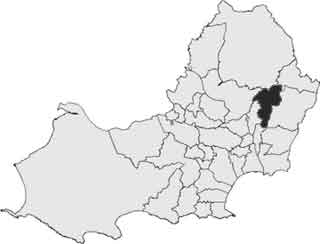
- Area: 7.32 km^{2} (2.83 sq mi)
- Population: 16,928 (2011 census)
  - Density: 2,313/km^{2} (5,990/sq mi)
- Principal area: Swansea
- Preserved county: West Glamorgan
- Country: Wales
- Sovereign state: United Kingdom
- UK Parliament: Swansea East
- Senedd Cymru – Welsh Parliament: Swansea East
- Councillors: John Davies (Labour); Robert Stewart (Labour); Robert Davies (Labour); Andrea Harrington (Labour); Yvonne Jardine (Labour)

Morriston ((Welsh:Treforys or Treforus)) is an electoral ward in Swansea, Wales. It is coterminous with the Morriston community. Morriston is one of two five member wards in the City and County of Swansea local authority area. In population terms, it is the largest ward in the Welsh Assembly constituency of Swansea East and it is the largest ward in the City and County of Swansea.

The electoral ward consists of some or all of the following geographical areas: Caemawr, Cwmrhydyceirw, Graig Felen, Morriston, Parc Gwernfadog, Pant-lasau, Ynysforgan and Ynystawe, in the parliamentary constituency of Swansea East. The ward is bounded by the wards of Llansamlet and Clydach to the east; Bonymaen and Landore to the south; Mynydd-Bach and Llangyfelach to the west; and Mawr to the north.

The ward is broken down into a number of polling districts by the local council. These are: Parc-y-Duc, Glantawe, Pentrepoeth, Tircanol, Caemawr, Cwmrhydyceirw East, Cwmrhydyceirw West, Parc Gwernfadog and Ynystawe.

== History ==
Morriston first became an electoral ward in the late nineteenth century with the formation of Glamorgan County Council. The first county councillor to be elected in 1889 was the Liberal, David Davies.

== Politics ==
Morriston is one of only two wards in Swansea which returns five councillors to the local council, the other being Sketty. Morriston currently returns five Labour councillors: Mike Hedges, Robert Francis-Davies, John Davies, Bob Lloyd and Rob Stewart.

In the 2008 local election the Ward was contested by all five incumbent Labour Councillors, and by five Liberal Democrats, five Conservatives, two Plaid Cymru candidates and one British National Party candidate. The poll took place on 1 May 2008, along with elections in every other ward of Swansea.

The turnout of the 2012 local elections in Morriston was 29.95%. The results were:

Candidate	Party	Votes	Status
John Davies	Labour	2599	Labour hold
Robert Stewart	Labour	2500	Labour hold
Robert Davies	Labour	2342	Labour hold
Andrea Harrington	Labour	2302	Labour hold
Yvonne Jardine	Labour	2190	Labour hold
Adrian Davies	Independent	869	
Dic Jones	Plaid Cymru	800	
James Hatton	Conservative	504	
Bill Hughes	Conservative	501	
Sheila Morgan	Conservative	467	
Richard James Strick-Jenkins	Conservative	404	
Ken Anderson	Liberal Democrats	351	
Jennifer Margaret Bickerstaff	Conservative	341	
Rosemarie Bridgeman	Liberal Democrats	276	
Owen John Roberts	Liberal Democrats	254	
Anjali Kadam	Liberal Democrats	187	
