= Llansamlet (electoral ward) =

Coordinates: 51.66546°N 3.89555°W

Llansamlet Ward
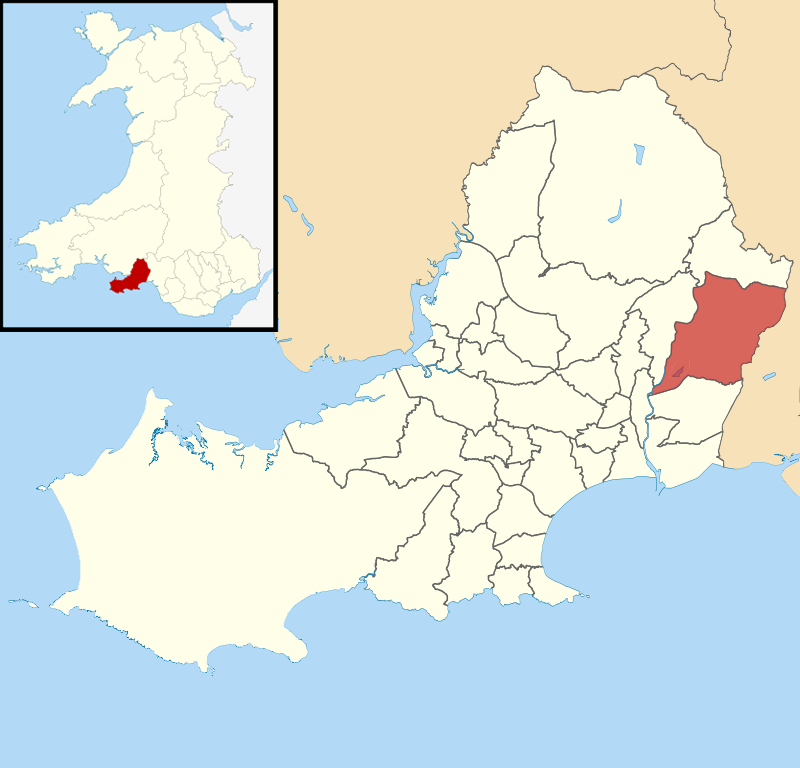
- Location of Llansamlet ward (post-2012) within the City and County of Swansea
- Area: 15.54 km^{2} (6.00 sq mi)
- Population: 14,433 (2011 census)
  - Density: 929/km^{2} (2,410/sq mi)
- Principal area: Swansea
- Preserved county: West Glamorgan
- Country: Wales
- Sovereign state: United Kingdom
- UK Parliament: Swansea East
- Senedd Cymru – Welsh Parliament: Swansea East
- Councillors: Ryland Doyle (Labour); Penny Matthews (Labour); Uta Clay (Labour); Robert Clay (Labour)

Llansamlet is an electoral ward (coterminous with the Llansamlet community) in the City and County of Swansea, Wales, UK.

The electoral ward consists of some or all of the following geographical areas: Birchgrove, Glais, Heol Las, Llansamlet, Morriston, Peniel Green, Pentre-Dwr, Talycopa, Trallwn and Summer Hill in the parliamentary constituency of Swansea East. The Llansamlet ward is bounded by the wards of Clydach to the north, Morriston to the west, Neath Port Talbot county borough to the east, and Bonymaen to the south.

== Local elections ==
Llansamlet councillor and Lord Mayor of Swansea, Dennis James, died in April 2013. His death led to a by-election:

Llansamlet Ward by-election, 4 July 2013
Party	Candidate	Votes	%	±%
Labour	Robert Clay	1,368	74.95	
Conservative	James Hatton	236	12.93	
Liberal Democrats	Samuel Rees	113	6.19	N/A
National Front	Claire Thomas	108	5.91	N/A
Majority		1,132	62.02	
Turnout		1,825	16.9	

In the 2012 local elections, the turnout was 30.32%. The results were:

Llansamlet Ward, 2012
Party	Candidate	Votes	%	±%
Labour	Ryland Doyle	2,185		
Labour	Penny Matthews	2,154		
Labour	Uta Clay	2,051		
Labour	Dennis James	1,971		
Independent	June Evans	952		
Conservative	Roger Evans	354		
Conservative	Joshua Gaskell	335		
Conservative	Leigh Moss	328		
Majority				
Turnout		10,330	30.32	

== Districts ==
The suburb of Llansamlet is the area where part of the Swansea Enterprise Park is located.

Trallwn is a suburb to the east of the ward comprising a large housing estate and a primary school, Trallwn Primary School. Just to the south of Trallwn is Pentre Dwr, a predominantly farming and rural area. There are a number of horse riding schools here. To the west of Pentre Dwr and Talycopa (behind Trallwn shops) is a small housing district called Summer Hill. Trallwn, Talycopa and Summer Hill are not part of the Llansamlet area.
