= Cockett =

Cockett: Welsh: Y Cocyd
- Waunarlwydd Road

- Location within Swansea
- Population: 13,362 (Ward and Community 2011)
- OS grid reference: SS629939
- Community: Cockett
- Principal area: Swansea
- Preserved county: West Glamorgan
- Country: Wales
- Sovereign state: United Kingdom
- Post town: SWANSEA
- Postcode district: SA2, SA5
- Dialling code: 01792
- Police: South Wales
- Fire: Mid and West Wales
- Ambulance: Welsh
- UK Parliament: Swansea West
- Senedd Cymru – Welsh Parliament: Swansea West
- List of places UK Wales Swansea 51.62718°N 03.98196°W Map of the community

Cockett (Welsh: Y Cocyd) is a district and community in Swansea, Wales falling within Cockett ward. It is located about 1.5 miles (2.4 km) north-west of Swansea city centre. It includes the eastern half of Gowerton.

Cockett, in common with much of western Swansea, was the result of late Victorian and early twentieth century expansion. More housing estates were developed during the 20th century and further housing was constructed near the Townhill district in the early 2000s. The area now has a broad mix of housing stock. 83 per cent of the property in the Cockett neighbourhood is owner occupied. The South Wales Police regional headquarters for Swansea were based in Cockett, as is Dylan Thomas Community School. The South Wales Police regional headquarters are now located closer to the city centre however. There are a few shops in central Cockett, but the nearest shopping districts are on Carmarthen Road (A483) to the north and the Swansea West Business Park to the north-west.

The main road through Cockett is the A4216 road linking Sketty to the south with Fforestfach to the north. Cockett railway station is a currently disused railway station to the north, by Station Road. The old platforms on the West Wales Lines are still in place and there are proposals by South West Wales Integrated Transport Consortium to reinstate this station in the future, which would provide a 10-minute journey to Swansea railway station in the city centre. Cockett is served by First Cymru buses from Swansea bus station: numbers 15 and 17 to Gowerton; number 43 to Morriston Hospital and numbers 400 and 404 to Llanelli.
