= Mawr =

Coordinates: 51.70896°N 3.98421°W

- Area: 57.81 km^{2} (22.32 sq mi)
- Population: 1,850 (2011 census)
  - Density: 32/km^{2} (83/sq mi)
- Principal area: Swansea
- Preserved county: West Glamorgan
- Country: Wales
- Sovereign state: United Kingdom
- Police: South Wales
- Fire: Mid and West Wales
- Ambulance: Welsh
- UK Parliament: Gower
- Senedd Cymru – Welsh Parliament: Gŵyr Abertawe
- List of places UK Wales Swansea Map of the community

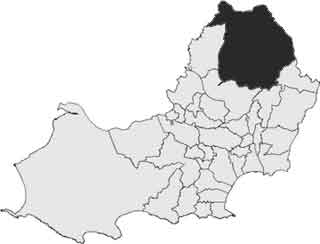
Pre-2022 Mawr electoral ward

Mawr is a community (and former electoral ward) of the City and County of Swansea, in south Wales, U.K. Mawr has its own elected community council. Its name simply means "large", and it was given the name because it was the largest piece of land in the former parish of Llangyfelach.

== Description ==
Mawr falls within the parliamentary constituency of Gower. It is bounded by the communities of Pontarddulais to the west; Llangyfelach and Morriston to the south; Clydach to the southeast; Pontardawe of Neath Port Talbot to the northeast; Betws to the north and Tycroes to the north west. For the purposes of community elections it is broken down into three polling districts: Garnswllt, Craigcefnparc and Felindre.

Mawr consists of some or all of the following villages: Felindre, Bryntwood, Craigcefnparc, Garnswllt, Rhydypandy and rural uplands of Mawr. The ward is one of the most sparsely populated in Swansea, and it has the highest proportion of Welsh language speakers (38% of those over three years old at the 2011 census). Mawr was the second largest ward in Swansea by land area, and the largest community. Most of the community consists of rural farmland and open moorland.

== Local government ==
Mawr elects a community council of 12 members (with one vacancy in 2016), though in 2015 the council was found to be performing its duties inadequately and not addressing the problems identified in a 2011 report.

=== 2022 boundary changes ===
Until 2022 Mawr was an electoral ward to Swansea Council. Following a local government ward boundary review, at the 2022 local elections the Mawr ward ceased to exist, with the area absorbed into the neighbouring wards of Clydach, Llangyfelach and Pontarddulais.

=== 2012 local council elections ===
In the 2012 local council elections, the voter turnout for Mawr was 44.82%. The results were:

Candidate	Party	Votes	Status
Ioan Richard	The People's Representative	295	The People's Representative hold
Rhys Aeron Jones	Labour	213	
Linda Mary Frame	Plaid Cymru	149	

== Lliw Reservoirs country park ==
There are two man-made reservoirs near the village of Felindre, in the Lliw valley, called the Lower Lliw Reservoir and the Upper Lliw Reservoir. The reservoirs are managed by Welsh Water. The surrounding countryside is open to the public for recreational purposes.

The Lower Lliw Reservoir (or Felindre Reservoir) was originally opened in 1863 to provide water for Swansea and the surrounding area; it cost £160,000 to create. The Upper Lliw Reservoir opened in 1892 and cost £116,000 to build. The Lower Lliw Reservoir was reconstructed between 1976 and 1978, including a new rockfill dam, new overflow spillway and new pumping station.
