= Cefn Hengoed, Swansea =

Village in United Kingdom

Coordinates: 51°38′35″N 3°54′20″W

Cefn Hengoed is a suburban district in the City and County of Swansea, Wales falling into the Bon-y-maen ward. Cefn Hengoed is set on the top of a hill near the village of Bon-y-maen.

The local comprehensive school is Cefn Hengoed Comprehensive School and the local leisure facility is Cefn Hengoed Leisure Centre which was recently shut down due to budget cuts and renovations to the teachers lounge.
