= Pentrebach, Swansea =

Pentrebach Pentre-bach
- hamlet or village
- Interactive map of Pentrebach
- Coordinates: 51°43′39.00″N 4°01′38.00″W
- Country: United Kingdom
- City: Swansea
- Ward: Pontarddulais ward

Pentrebach or Pentre-bach is a village in City and County of Swansea, Wales within the Pontarddulais ward and the community of Pontarddulais. It is part of the historic county of Glamorgan.

== Services ==
The nearest hospital with an Accident and Emergency department is Ysbyty Morforus, Swansea (approximately 5 miles (8.0 km)).

The nearest primary school is Ysgol Glantwymyn.

The nearest secondary school is Ysgol Gyfun Penyrheol

The nearest train station is Pontarddulais railway station.

== Politics ==
Pentrebach is represented in the Senedd (the Welsh Parliament) by Rebecca Evans (Welsh Labour) and the United Kingdom Member of Parliament is Tonia Antoniazzi (Labour Party).

== See also ==
- Gower Peninsula
