= Clyne Common =

Lowland area in the Gower Peninsula, Wales

Coordinates: 51.592°N 4.027°W

Clyne Common (Welsh: Comin Clun) is a lowland area of common land in the Gower Peninsula, Wales. Clyne Common is the easternmost of a set of commons that includes Fairwood Common, Forest Common, Pengwern Common, and Welsh Moor. This group comprise a belt of land lying across the south western edge of the coalfield deposits in Swansea which were left in an unenclosed state when adjacent field systems were laid out.

Some of the land has been used as a golf course since the early 20th century. The Clyne Golf Club was formed in 1920, and the course was designed by golf architects Messrs Harry Colt and Harries. The golf course consists of two loops of nine holes, forming a figure of eight.
