= Blaen-y-Maes =

Coordinates: 51°39′18.00″N 3°58′49.00″W

Blaen-y-Maes is a local authority maintained housing estate of the City and County Swansea, Wales. It falls within the Penderry ward. The local football club, Blaen-y-Maes AFC, was founded in 1973, and currently plays in the Swansea Senior Football League Premier Division.
