= Morfa, Swansea =

Area in Swansea, Wales, UK

Coordinates: 51°38′33.00″N 3°56′20.00″W

Morfa is a district of Swansea, Wales. It straddles the Bon-y-maen and Landore wards and generally covers the eastern part of the district of Landore.

Morfa is originally an old Welsh word for "marsh", not so much used in current parlance but found in Welsh placenames. The area is named after the Morfa copperworks which once existed in the area.

== History ==
The Morfa Copperworks was started in 1835 and operated until the site closed in 1980. Several of the copperworks buildings still remain on the site.

Morfa was mainly an area of light industry in the late 20th century. Until the development of the Morfa retail park and the Swansea.com Stadium in the new millennium, the area was a post industrial brownfield site with a local sports and leisure complex.

On the west bank were large grass playing fields which were also used for outdoor concerts. The west bank was re-developed into the Liberty Stadium complex, now renamed the Swansea.com Stadium.

Copper Quarter apartment block

On the east bank of the River Tawe stood the Morfa stadium, indoor and outdoor tennis courts and rubber surfaced football fields. The area now consists of a new town centre comprising the Morfa Shopping Park shopping centre and the Copper Quarter residential area to the south of the retail park. About 700 new homes are being built by the developer Barratt.

Nearby is Pluck Lake known for a sighting of an unusual animal in April 2008.

== Morfa Shopping Park ==
The Morfa Shopping Park was developed on the site of the Morfa Stadium. It is an out-of-town shopping centre accessible from the A4067. It has 265,000 sq ft (24,600 m^{2}) of retail space. Retail units include a B&Q store – the largest B&Q store in Wales at 105,000 sq ft (9,800 m^{2}).
