= Craig-cefn-parc =

Village in Swansea, Wales

Coordinates: 51°42′33″N 3°54′57″W

- Location within Swansea
- Population: 887
- OS grid reference: SN689013
- Community: Craig-cefn-parc
- Principal area: Swansea
- Preserved county: West Glamorgan
- Country: Wales
- Sovereign state: United Kingdom
- Post town: SWANSEA
- Postcode district: SA6
- Dialling code: 01792
- Police: South Wales
- Fire: Mid and West Wales
- Ambulance: Welsh
- UK Parliament: Gower
- Senedd Cymru – Welsh Parliament: Gower

Craig-cefn-parc is a village near Clydach, outside Swansea, Wales. It falls within the Mawr ward of Swansea. The name means "park ridge rock". Cwm Clydach RSPB nature reserve is located at the south of the village, near the New Inn Public House, at the boundary between Craig-cefn-parc and Clydach. Craig-cefn-parc is famous for its mining history with several large drift mines employing hundreds of men. In the heart of the Lower Clydach River (Cwm Clydach nature reserve) are some of the old coal houses, there is also a coal tram located in the centre of the village to commemorate its mining history. Craig Cefn Parc school was closed in 2019. A small memorial garden was created lower down in the village for a place to reflect and sit for a while. The village has a small store, a community building and playing fields. In 2020 funding was obtained for a children's park and play area.
