= Killay, Swansea =

Community in Swansea, Wales

Coordinates: 51.61791°N 4.01800°W

Killay
- Community
- Principal area: Swansea
- Country: Wales
- Sovereign state: United Kingdom
- Police: South Wales
- Fire: Mid and West Wales
- Ambulance: Welsh
- List of places UK Wales Swansea Map of the community

Killay (Welsh: Cilâ) is a suburb and community in Swansea, Wales. Killay has its own community council. The village is set high above sea level, about 3.5 miles (5.6 km) west of Swansea city centre. It adjoins the town of Dunvant and the Tycoch area of Swansea. Gowerton lies to the north. The community had a population of 5,702 in 2011.

The north of the area is mainly residential and is deemed a relatively affluent area of Swansea. The south of the area consists of an unpopulated common, which is used for grazing and forms part of Gower Area of Outstanding Natural Beauty. There is also another community called Upper Killay.

== Geography ==
Killay Marsh Local Nature Reserve covers 21.3 acres (8.62 hectares) and comprises a mosaic of wetland habitats. Wet woodland (alder and willow carr), swamp and marsh habitat straddle the upper River Clyne with open marsh, fen, wet heath, with drier grassland and woodland on the slightly drier marginal area. The local nature reserve is a remnant of a much larger wetland area destroyed by land reclamation animation for development including housing and landfill between 1930 and 1970. The land is owned by the City and County of Swansea and has been managed by the Wildlife Trust of South and West Wales since 1995.

== Education ==
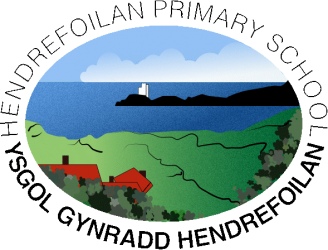
Hendrefoilan Primary School

Hendrefoilan Primary School is a primary school in Killay with 236 pupils enrolled as of 2023. The headteacher is Ms Aimee Field. In the 2022/23 school year, the school was doubly oversubscribed.

== Mining history ==
The village of Killay evolved as a direct result of the south Wales coal industry. There were a good number of mines in Killay, the Clyne valley and in the neighbouring village of Dunvant dating back as far as the 14th century. The largest company, but also one of the latest, to mine coal in the district was the Killan Colliery Company, which began operations in 1899. There were two drifts, one working the Penlan seam, the other the Penclawdd seam. In 1902 the colliery was taken over by W.W. Holmes and Co. By 1919 the mine had grown to be one of the largest in the area employing 755 men, mostly from the nearby village of Dunvant. In 1920 Henry Folland's Killan Collieries Ltd bought the colliery as a source of supply for his Grovesend Steel and Tinplate Company. In 1923 the Penclawdd drift was also producing house coal and had grown to over 1,500 yards (1,400 m) in length.

=== The Killan Colliery Disaster ===
On 27 November 1924, an inrush of water flooded the mine with such force that it tore out the roof. As soon as the news reached the surface, rescuers rushed to the mine to assist several trapped miners. Two bodies were recovered almost immediately, and it soon became apparent that a further eleven men were trapped in the mine. Pumps were brought in from other mines, and rescuers made frantic attempts to reach the captive miners. After fifty hours, a call reached the surface to send down ladders because eight men had been located. The men had survived by breathing from an air pocket and were soon freed. Divers were then sent to search for the remaining three men who were still missing, without success. It was not until 1 January 1925 that their bodies were finally retrieved.

The men who lost their lives in the disaster were:

- Archie Davis (28)
- Charles Evans (30)
- Phil Godbeer (32)
- Willie Goulding (22)
- Wilfred John (17)

The mine would never recover from the disaster, and was to close later in 1925.
