= Grovesend =

Coordinates: 51°41′16″N 4°02′17″W

- Population: 1,131 (village)
- Principal area: Swansea
- Preserved county: West Glamorgan
- Country: Wales
- Sovereign state: United Kingdom
- Post town: SWANSEA
- Postcode district: SA4
- Dialling code: 01792
- Police: South Wales
- Fire: Mid and West Wales
- Ambulance: Welsh
- UK Parliament: Gower
- Senedd Cymru – Welsh Parliament: Gŵyr Abertawe
- List of places UK Wales Swansea Map of the Grovesend and Waungron community

Grovesend (Welsh: Pengelli; Welsh pronunciation) is a village in the community of Grovesend and Waungron (Welsh: Pengelli a Waungron), City and County of Swansea in Wales. The community has a population of 1,131.

Over the last 100 years Grovesend has gone through the transition of being a big mining community to a quiet semi rural village. It is mainly a residential community, with the major amenity being the welfare club. Locals often travel to nearby areas such as Gorseinon or Pontarddulais for shopping. Grovesend also has a primary school, with about 100 pupils in, and a nursing home.

Grovesend has one football team Pengelli United FC. Despite being based in Swansea, like many teams of the west they compete in the Carmarthenshire League.

== Geology ==
Gorseinon is built upon the Grovesend formation. Lithological characteristics are predominantly argillaceous, comprising mudstones and siltstones, with well developed coals; minor lithic ("Pennant") sandstones; locally developed red mudstones in the type area. Description of the lower boundary of this formation is that the base is placed at the base of the Swansea Four-Feet Coal of the Swansea district (equivalent of the Llantwit No.3 Seam in the Pontypridd district and the Mynyddislwyn Seam east of the Taff valley), where it overlies mudstone seatearth at the top of the predominantly arenaceous Swansea Member in the Swansea district and the similar Hughes Member in the east of the coalfield. It is a conformable boundary in the west, but is assumed to be an unconformable one in the east (Woodland et al., 1957; Squirrell and Downing, 1969; Barclay, 1989). Also taken at the base of the laterally correlatable Rudge Coal in the Radstack part of the Somerset Coalfield, the High Coal of the Bristol Coalfield and the Avonmouth No.1 Coal of the Severn Coal Basin. Description of the upper boundary is The Grovesend Formation is the youngest unit found in the South Wales and Forest of Dean coalfields. It is overlain unconformably by sandstones of the Sherwood Sandstone Group in the Newent Coalfield, by mudstones of the Mercia Mudstone Group in the Oxfordshire Coalfield and either the Sherwood Sandstone or Mercia Mudstone groups in the Bristol/Somerset Coalfields.
