= Pentrechwyth =

Village in Swansea, Wales, UK

Coordinates: 51°38′25″N 3°55′11″W

Pentrechwyth (sometimes spelt Pentre-chwyth; English: village on the left) is a village in Swansea, Wales on the east bank of the River Tawe north of Kilvey Hill, falling within the Bon-y-maen ward. The village approximates to the built up area around Jersey Road just uphill from the junction with the A4217 road and most recently the Copper Quarter development on the old Addis site.

The cartoonist Glan Williams was born here.

It is home to Pentrechwyth Primary School.
