= Landimore =

Coordinates: 51.6162°N 4.2183°W

Landimore: Welsh: Llandîmôr
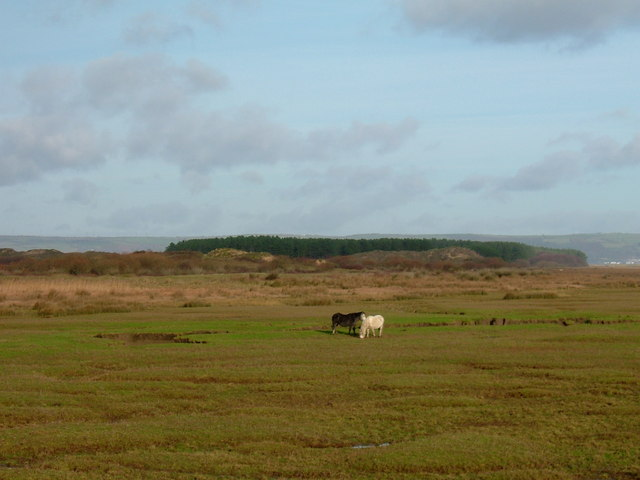
- Landimore Marsh

- Location within Swansea
- OS grid reference: SS465932
- Community: Llangennith, Llanmadoc and Cheriton
- Principal area: Swansea
- Preserved county: West Glamorgan
- Country: Wales
- Sovereign state: United Kingdom
- Post town: SWANSEA
- Postcode district: SA3
- Dialling code: 01792
- Police: South Wales
- Fire: Mid and West Wales
- Ambulance: Welsh
- UK Parliament: Gower
- Senedd Cymru – Welsh Parliament: Gŵyr Abertawe

Landimore (Welsh: Llandîmôr) is a hamlet on the north coast of the Gower, in the City and County of Swansea, south Wales. To the north are the extensive saltmarshes of Landimore Marsh, adjoining the Loughor estuary. Landimore Castle which is also known as Bovehill Castle is perched on a hill overlooking the village at OS grid reference SS 464993. Its ruinous remains are on private ground.
