= Tycoch =

Suburban district of Swansea, Wales

Coordinates: 51°37′22″N 3°59′29″W

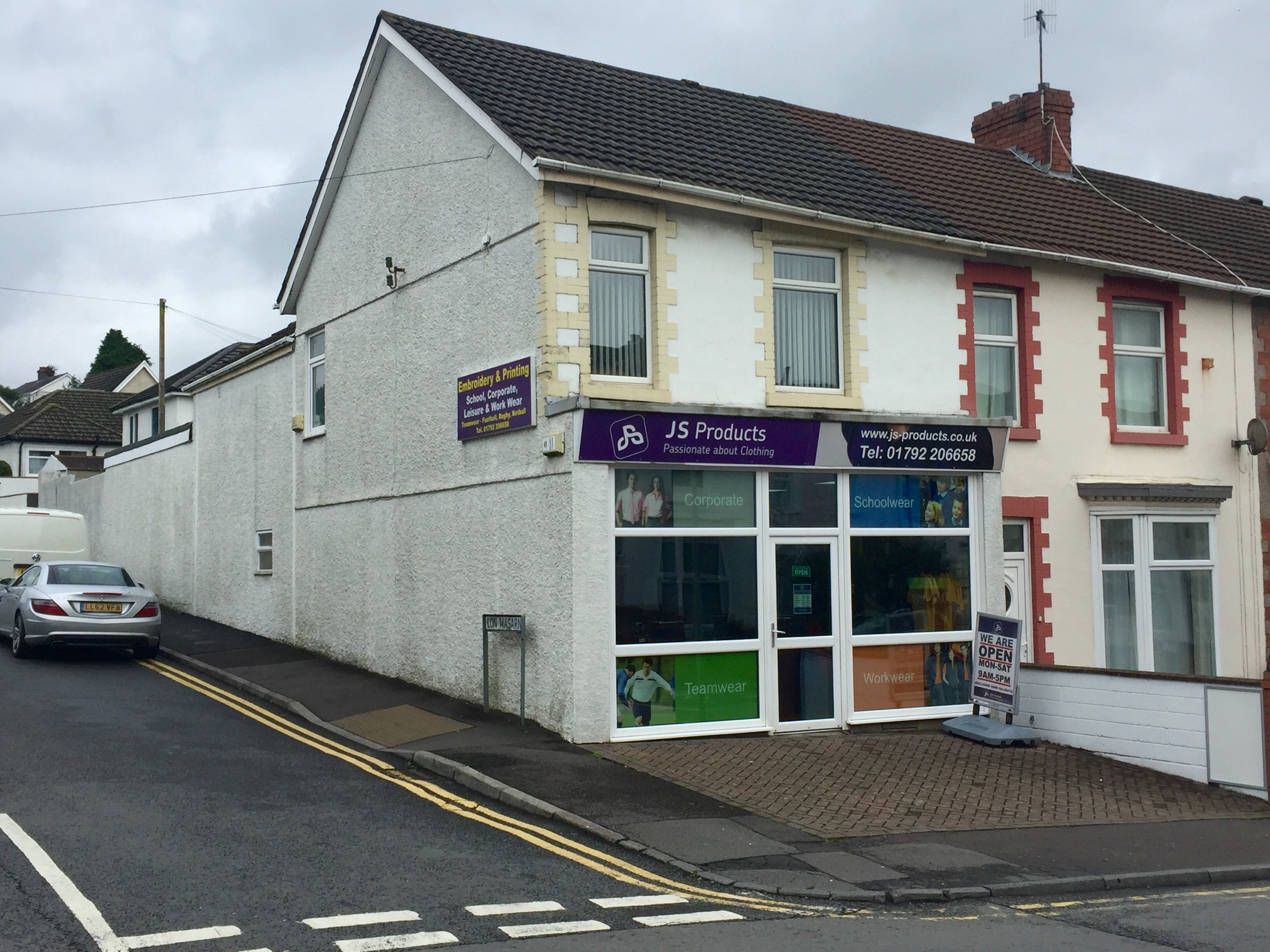
- 74 Tycoch Road

- Location within Swansea
- Community: Sketty
- Principal area: Swansea
- Country: Wales
- Sovereign state: United Kingdom
- Police: South Wales
- Fire: Mid and West Wales
- Ambulance: Welsh

Tycoch (also written Ty-coch) is a suburban district in the community of Sketty, in the City and County of Swansea in Wales. It is situated in the Sketty ward of the city, north-west of Sketty Cross. The area is chiefly residential. Housing around Carnglas Square is mostly pre-war, while that the higher ground at Llwyn Mawr dates from the 1970s onwards.

== Amenities ==
There are several shops and other commercial premises in and around Carnglas Square (the junction of Carnglas Road, Harlech Crescent, and Ty-coch Road) including a sub post office, a newsagent, a computer shop, an Indian takeaway, and a wine bar / bistro, but no pub. There is also a pharmacy, a hairdresser for ladies and gents, a professional tuition centre, a print shop, a computer specialist shop, a tanning salon, a clothes clinic and cleaners. The corner shop/newsagent closed on 8 December 2014 and re-opened as a Co-Operative small supermarket in March 2015. The building was extended and refurbished.

Sketty Primary School is in Llwyn Mawr Close, Carnglas, while tertiary education is provided at the Tycoch campus of Gower College Swansea (the former Swansea College) at the junction of Ty-coch Road and Vivian Road, not far from Sketty Cross.

The Church in Wales opened All Souls Church in Tycoch in 1957. There are in addition two chapels in the area.

In 1932 the Cefn Coed Hospital was opened in Tycoch, as a mental hospital. Swansea Bay University Health Board announced in 2012 intends to close the hospital, with plans for housing and a new adult acute mental health ward being built on the site. Ysbryd y Coed, a 60 bed unit for dementia patients has already been opened on the site.

Sports superstars Scott Mackay and Robert Phillips, and famous mariner Andrew Roberts all hail from the area.
