= Clydach (electoral ward) =

Electoral ward in Wales

Coordinates: 51.696°N 3.889°W

Clydach Ward
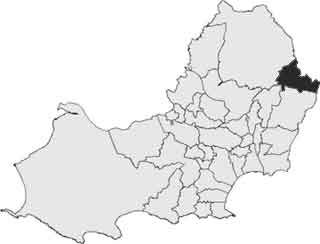
- Area: 8.46 km^{2} (3.27 sq mi)
- Population: 7,503 (2011 census)
  - Density: 887/km^{2} (2,300/sq mi)
- Principal area: Swansea
- Preserved county: West Glamorgan
- Country: Wales
- Sovereign state: United Kingdom
- UK Parliament: Gower
- Senedd Cymru – Welsh Parliament: Gower
- Councillors: Paulette Smith (Labour); Gordon Walker (Independent)

Clydach is an electoral ward (and a town) in the City and County of Swansea, Wales, UK.

The electoral ward of Clydach consists of some or all of the following areas: Clydach (town), Faerdre, Glais (East), Graig Felen and Penydre in the parliamentary constituency of Gower. The ward is bounded by Mawr to the west, and Morriston and Llansamlet to the south.

== Current representation ==
Clydach 2017
Party	Candidate	Votes	%	±%
Independent	Gordon David Walker*	1,211		
Labour	Paulette Bradley Smith*	1,134		
Labour	Julie Marlene Davies	825		
Plaid Cymru	Elgan Davies-Jones	387		
Conservative	David James Rowlands-Lean	311		
Conservative	Roda Ali	230		
Turnout			28.4	−8.0
Independent hold		Swing		
Labour hold		Swing		

== Recent history ==
The first election to the new unitary City and County of Swansea Council took place in 1995. The ward was won by Labour.

Clydach 1995
Party	Candidate	Votes	%	±%
Labour	Bryan Edwin Ayres	540		
Plaid Cymru	James Vernon Davies	351		
Labour win (new seat)				

In 1999, the number of seats increased from one to two. Labour held won seat (although the sitting Labour member was defeated) and the other seat was won by an Independent.

Clydach 1999
Party	Candidate	Votes	%	±%
Independent	Sylvia Mary Lewis	963		
Labour	Roger Llewellyn Smith	845		
Labour	Bryan Edwin Ayres*	844		
Plaid Cymru	James Vernon Davies	764		
Plaid Cymru	Diana Owen	697		
Independent	Denise Preece	509		
Independent win (new seat)				
Labour win (new seat)				

Clydach 2004
Party	Candidate	Votes	%	±%
Labour	Roger Llewellyn Smith*	1,107		
Liberal Democrats	Sylvia Mary Lewis*	761		
Plaid Cymru	James Vernon Davies	595		
Labour	Islwyn Hopkins	589		
Liberal Democrats	Julie Marlene Davies	486		
Conservative	Robert Andrew Evans	172		
Conservative	Jonathan Bray Stockting	131		
Labour hold		Swing		
Liberal Democrats hold		Swing		

Clydach 2008
Party	Candidate	Votes	%	±%
Labour	Roger Llewellyn Smith*	1,115		
Labour	Paulette Bradley Smith	820		
Liberal Democrats	Sylvia Mary Lewis*	710		
Independent	Julie Marlene Davies	509		
Liberal Democrats	Janice Maureen Jarman	322		
Conservative	Janice Birch	248		
Conservative	Barry John Stubbings	226		
Turnout			38.1	
Labour hold		Swing		
Labour gain from Liberal Democrats		Swing		

Clydach 2012
Party	Candidate	Votes	%	±%
Labour	Paulette Bradley Smith*	1,055		
Independent	Gordon David Walker	1,040		
Independent	Roger Llewellyn Smith*	915		
Labour	Gillian Wakeman	702		
Turnout			36.4	−1.7
Labour hold		Swing		
Independent gain from Labour		Swing		
