= Portmead =

Coordinates: 51°39′12″N 3°58′37″W

Portmead (or Port Mead) (Welsh: Porthfedd [pɔrθˈveːð]) is an outer suburb of Swansea, Wales, which falls within the Penderry ward. Portmead is mostly residential and approximates to the area either side of north western part of Pentregethin Road.
