= Garnswllt =

Village in the United Kingdom

Coordinates: 51.7628°N 3.9936°W

Garnswllt (Welsh pronunciation) is a rural village in the City and County of Swansea, Wales falling within the Mawr ward. It lies in the far north of Swansea near the border with Carmarthenshire.

Garnswllt is also a community ward for elections to Mawr Community Council.
