= Pentre Dwr =

Coordinates: 51°39′02.00″N 3°53′30.00″W

Pentre Dŵr is part of the Winch Wen area of Swansea. It approximates to the settlement east of Winch Wen and south of Trallwn along Crymlyn Road.
