= Ilston =

Coordinates: 51.59399°N 4.08026°W

- Village and community
- OS grid reference: SS556904
- Principal area: Swansea
- Country: Wales
- Sovereign state: United Kingdom
- Police: South Wales
- Fire: Mid and West Wales
- Ambulance: Welsh
- List of places UK Wales Swansea Map of the community

Ilston (Welsh: Llanilltud Gwyr) is a village and community in Swansea, southwest Wales. Ilston has its own community council.

== Description ==
The population of the community in the United Kingdom Census 2001 was 538 and 537 in 2011 and also includes the villages and hamlets of Parkmill, Nicholaston and Lunnon. The name of the village is thought to have originated from Saint Illtud.

This village in the heart of the Gower Peninsula is home to a brook, parish church and a National Trust abandoned limestone quarry.

The community is surrounded by common land used as grazing land, woodlands and fields.

There is a highly recommended two mile walk from the church through five different kinds of woods and over four small bridges following the brook past the first recorded Baptist Church in Wales (1649) ending at a Parkmill-based public house.

== Governance ==
Ilston has a community council, with 11 councillors representing the community wards of Ilston, Penmaen and Nicholaston.

Ilston is covered by the Pennard ward for elections to Swansea Council.

== See also ==
- Ilston Book
