= Reynoldston =

Coordinates: 51.5896°N 4.1937°W

- Village and community
- Principal area: Swansea
- Country: Wales
- Sovereign state: United Kingdom
- Police: South Wales
- Fire: Mid and West Wales
- Ambulance: Welsh
- List of places UK Wales Swansea Map of the community

Reynoldston is a rural village and a community in the City and County of Swansea, Wales, which had a population of 439 in 2011. The community has its own elected community council. The village is located deep in the heart of the Gower Peninsula.

It has one of the longest functioning community broadband schemes in the UK, which has started in 2003, and has continued despite the availability of ADSL.

Reynoldston commemorates the new millennium with 'The Millennium Stone' which can be found on the village green, just underneath a tree. The village was also featured on 90s Breakfast TV show, 'The Big Breakfast', when a number of stones from an ancient circle went missing without trace. No further investigation was held.
