= Dunvant =

Village and community in Swansea, Wales

Coordinates: 51.62710°N 4.03843°W

- Community
- Principal area: Swansea
- Country: Wales
- Sovereign state: United Kingdom
- Police: South Wales
- Fire: Mid and West Wales
- Ambulance: Welsh
- List of places UK Wales Swansea Map of the community

Dunvant (Welsh: Dyfnant, Dyfn 'deep' and nant 'stream or brook') is a suburban district and community in the City and County of Swansea, Wales, and falls within the Dunvant ward. It is situated in a valley some 4.5 miles west of Swansea city centre. The population as of the 2011 census was 4,383. It adjoins the area of Killay.

== History ==
Dunvant started out as a small village based around the coal industry. The area between Dunvant and Gowerton was once quite heavily industrialised. with four nearby collieries Killan, Bishwell, Bryn Mawr and Dunvant. Bishwell and Bryn Mawr to the south of Gowerton were short-lived and closed in the 1870s. However, the collieries in Dunvant have a longer history. Dunvant closed again in 1914. Killan ceased operations in 1925 following the disaster of 1924 in which five men were killed. At its peak it employed 900 men. Other industry included the Penlan (Dunvant) Brickworks and Quarry which although long since derelict is now an area of conservation and ecological diversity.

Development of this part of the South Wales Coalfield was due to the proximity of the Central Wales Line, which first opened to passengers in 1867 taking people from Swansea Victoria station via Blackpill through to Gowerton and beyond. At its peak, the railway carried up to 80 trains a day including express trains to Shrewsbury. Houses in the area sprung up in the form of ribbon development along the roads leading to the area in the early 1920s and 1930s. However, it was in the 1960s that larger housing estates appeared, creating the sub-urban area forming Dunvant today.

== Governance ==
Dunvant had its own community council, until it was dissolved in 2006.

Until 2022 Dunvant was an electoral ward to Swansea Council. Effective from the 2022 local elections it was merged with neighbouring Killay North and Killay South to become 'Dunvant and Killay', electing three county councillors.

== Education ==
Dunvant has two Primary Schools, Pen-y-Fro Primary situated on Priors Crescent (previously named Dyfnant Primary) and Dunvant School. Dunvant School opened to primary and secondary pupils in 1877 under the headship of Mr John Roach. The school replaced an earlier school in Killay. As the school expanded, the original buildings were insufficient and a number of temporary buildings were provided. The infants school originally operated from a corrugated iron building known as the Tin Shack until a new building was built in 1966 to the north of the junior school. The Tin Shack survived as part of the junior school until it was demolished in the mid 1980s.

In 1969, the new Olchfa School opened and many of the staff and older pupils transferred to the new school, with buildings belonging to the Dunvant Secondary School being transferred to the junior school.

Even with the new infants school and secondary school, accommodation at Dunvant became overcrowded due to the continued expansion of the large housing estates at Derlwyn and Broadmead. The overcrowding was alleviated in 1976 by the opening of the new Hendrefoilan Primary School in Killay.

In 2006, Dunvant Infant and Dunvant Junior Schools merged to form Dunvant Primary School. Many of the temporary buildings on the junior school site have now been removed, and a programme of building works is under way to bring the remaining buildings up to a modern standard.

== Sport and leisure ==
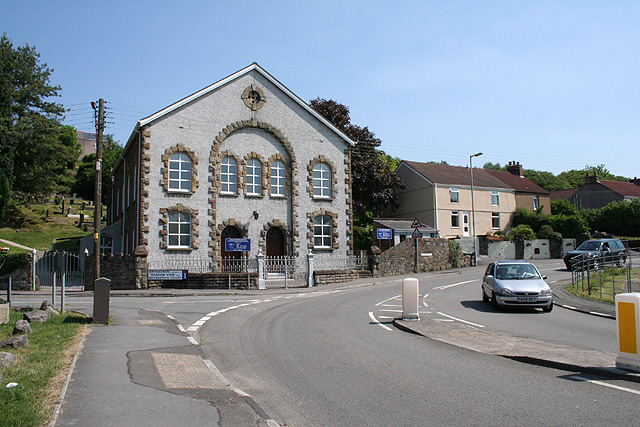
Ebenezer Congregational Chapel, first home of the Dunvant Male Choir - Côr Meibion Dyfnant

Rugby union club Dunvant RFC is based in the village.

Dunvant Male Choir is the longest-running male voice choir in Wales, having been founded in 1895.

The Clyne Valley Cycle Track part of National Cycle Network Route 4 runs through this village.

== Notable residents ==
- Sir Granville Beynon (1914-1996), physicist.
- John Ormond (1923–90), poet and film-maker.
- Heather Nicholson (1967- ), animal rights activist
- Ceri Richards (1903-1971), artist, acknowledged as Wales' most important artist of the mid-twentieth century, went to Dunvant infants and junior school.
- David John Thomas (1879-1925), Wales international rugby player

== Churches in Dunvant ==
- St Martin's
- Ebenezer
- St. Joachim and St. Anne Catholic Church
- Dunvant Gospel Hall
