= Llangyfelach =

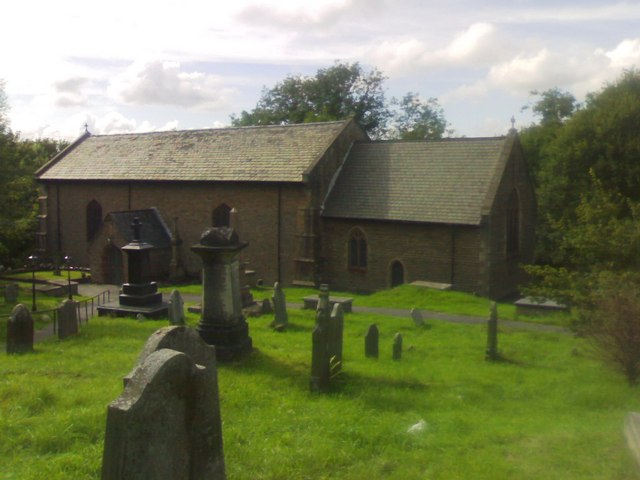
- The Parish Church of St David and Cyfelach

- Location within Swansea
- Population: 2,371
- OS grid reference: SS646988
- Principal area: Swansea
- Preserved county: West Glamorgan
- Country: Wales
- Sovereign state: United Kingdom
- Post town: SWANSEA
- Postcode district: SA5 & SA6
- Dialling code: 01792
- Police: South Wales
- Fire: Mid and West Wales
- Ambulance: Welsh
- UK Parliament: Gower
- Senedd Cymru – Welsh Parliament: Swansea East
- List of places UK Wales Swansea 51°40′18″N 3°57′17″W Map of the community

Llangyfelach is a village and community located in the City and County of Swansea, Wales, United Kingdom. Llangyfelach is situated about 4 miles north of the centre of Swansea, just west of Morriston. It falls within the Llangyfelach ward. To the west is open moorland. The population was 2,371 as of the 2021 UK census. The name is seemingly derived from a combination of 'llan' and 'Cyfelach' (the name of a saint), with a mutation to combine them for Llangyfelach.

== Description ==
Llangyfelach was once the name of a parish that covered much of the former Lordship of Gower. Today's community covers a smaller area including the site of the former Felindre tinplate works, which hosted the National Eisteddfod in 2006.

Bordering the village to the north is the M4 motorway, Junction 46. The village has its own primary school, crematorium, post office, the 'Plough and Harrow' pub, and a Scout hall.

At the centre of the village is the Parish Church of St David and Cyfelach. The site dates back to the 6th Century: St. David the Patron Saint of Wales founded an early Celtic monastery there. The present church has a 12th Century detached tower and a converted tithe barn as the present church. Contained within the church is the Llangyfelach Cross, a 9th Century Celtic stone.

Llangyfelach was the birthplace of the painter Evan Walters, and is mentioned in a folk song about the practice of 'pressing' men into military service.

It was also the birthplace of John Dillwyn Llewelyn FRS (1810–1882), botanist and pioneer photographer.

== Cancelled developments ==
There were proposals to develop a new 18 hole championship golf course and leisure complex near the village called Royal Fern Park. It was supposed to have "rivalled Celtic manor". In August 2008, it was announced that the plan was approved by the local council and would not be blocked by the Welsh Assembly. Part of the development would have included residential housing and a clubhouse with fitness and leisure facilities. However the decision went to a group of Am's and they cancelled it, saying the project fell foul of the structure plan.

== Sport ==
- Harry Payne is a Welsh rugby international who was born in Llangyfelach on 10 December 1907. He only ever had one cap, which was against New Zealand in 1935, where they won 13-12.
- Joe Rodon was born in Llangyfelach and lived there throughout his childhood. He was born on 22 October 1997. He currently plays for Leeds United in the English Championship. He is also a Welsh international, and currently has 50 caps.
