= Llansamlet =

District and community in Wales

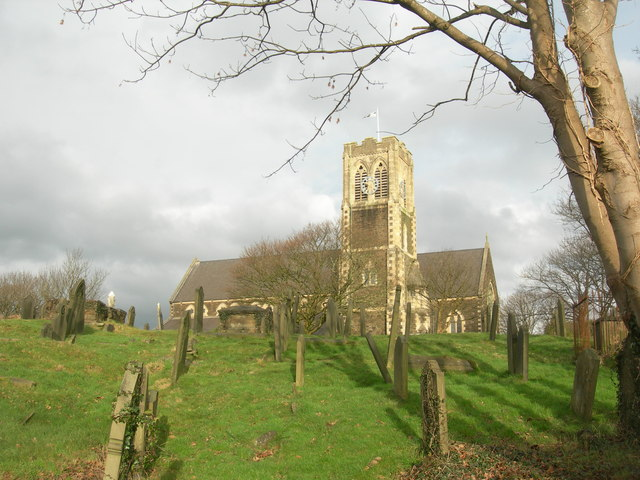
- St Samlet's church

- Location within Swansea
- Population: 7,041 (2011)
- OS grid reference: SS696975
- Principal area: Swansea
- Preserved county: West Glamorgan
- Country: Wales
- Sovereign state: United Kingdom
- Post town: SWANSEA
- Postcode district: SA1, SA6, SA7
- Dialling code: 01792
- Police: South Wales
- Fire: Mid and West Wales
- Ambulance: Welsh
- UK Parliament: Swansea East
- Senedd Cymru – Welsh Parliament: Swansea East
- List of places UK Wales Swansea 51.662°N 03.898°W Map of the community

Llansamlet is a suburban district and community of Swansea, Wales, falling into the Llansamlet ward. The area is centred on the A48 road (named Samlet Road and Clase Road in the area) and the M4 motorway.

Like other places in Wales having a name beginning with Llan, Llansamlet is named after a church, usually itself bearing the name of a saint – in this case, the church of Saint Samlet. There is a Saint Samlet's Church in the area on Church Road.

== History ==
Historically, the region was part of the Principality of Deheubarth until the Norman invasions between 1067 and 1101. From 1135 the Normans wrested the region from the Prince of Deheubarth and formed the basis for the Marcher Lordship of Kilvey of comital rank. After the Laws in Wales Act 1535 abolished Marcher lordships, the region was incorporated into the county of Glamorgan. The parish of Llansamlet became part of the borough of Swansea in two boundary changes in 1835 and 1918.

Llansamlet was an important coal mining area from at least the 14th century. Initially coal was mined for export. However, with the coming of the copper industry in the 18th century, much of the output was used for smelting purposes. In 1750 the principal mineral properties were acquired by Chauncy Townsend and they remained in his family until his great-grandson, Charles Henry Smith, relinquished them in 1872. By this time the best seams had been worked out and output was in decline. Coal-working finally ceased in the first half of the 20th century. Much of the former mining area is now occupied by the Swansea Enterprise Park.

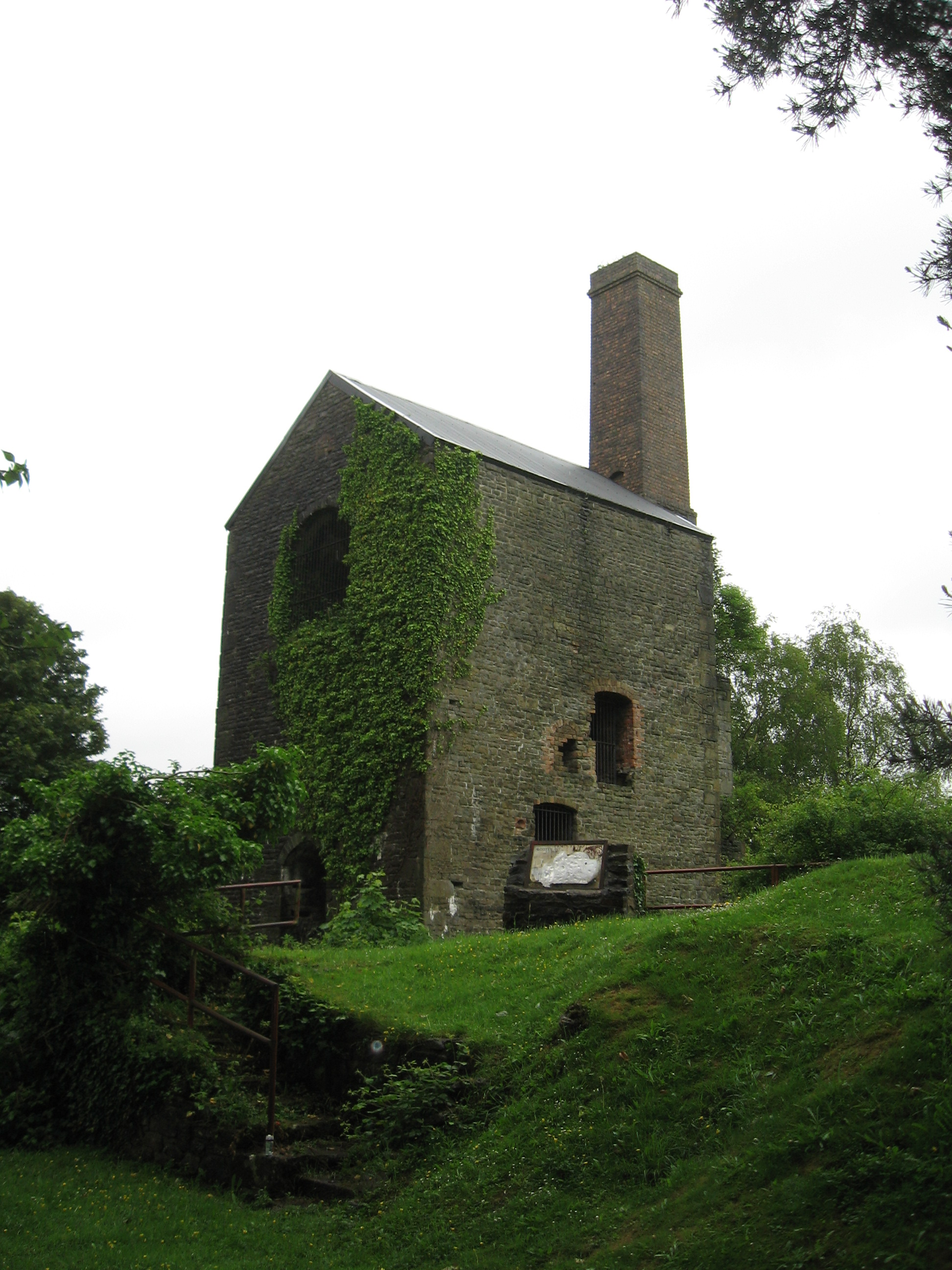
Engine house at Scotts Pit

One of the few surviving remains of the coal industry is Scotts Pit. The pit has a Cornish-style pumping engine house. Its construction can be dated to about 1823/1824. John Scott, the owner of the colliery, was a London solicitor who had taken a lease of the property in 1816. Coal was produced from 1819. In the same year, a locomotive was supplied by George Stephenson; however, it did not prove successful, and was soon withdrawn. Scott was unable to operate the pit profitably and pulled out in 1828. The pit then reverted to Charles Henry Smith. It continued in use, sometimes for coal winning, sometimes for pumping, until 1930. It was restored in the 1970s. It is often stated that the pit was sunk in the 1770s by a Captain John Scott, but there is no truth in this: it probably derives from a garbled oral tradition.

== Modern Llansamlet ==
Today the area consists of an urban belt centred on the A48 road and M4 motorway where new housing was built in the early 2000s. At the west of the area lies the Swansea Enterprise Park and Swansea Vale development area. The north of the area is mainly rural, consisting of farmland.

== Transport ==
Road transport links include the A48 trunk road to the M4 motorway (Junction 44). It has its own railway station to the east, served by the Transport for Wales Rail Swanline service between Cardiff and Swansea.

The railway runs through a cutting, designed by Isambard Kingdom Brunel. After a landslip when the line opened in 1850, Brunel designed four flying arches to hold the cutting walls apart. For extra stability, these arches were ballasted with high mounds of copper slag, an easily available waste product from the local copper industry in the Lower Swansea Valley. The four arches were completed in 1855 and are now Grade II listed structures.

== Notable residents ==
- Jack Kelsey, Welsh international goalkeeper
- Ruth Madoc, best known for appearing in the TV comedy show Hi-de-Hi!, grew up here.
- Dai Parker, Wales and British Lion rugby player, brother of Tom Parker, Welsh international rugby union captain
- Lucy Thomas, 19th century businesswoman
