= Bon-y-maen =

Bon-y-maen: Welsh: Bôn-y-maen
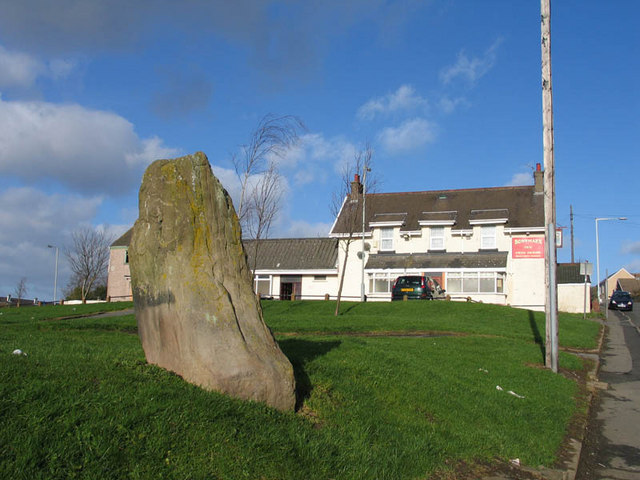
- Bon-y-maen's standing stone
- Population: 6,857 (2011)
- OS grid reference: SS6796
- Community: Bonymaen
- Principal area: Swansea
- Preserved county: West Glamorgan
- Country: Wales
- Sovereign state: United Kingdom
- Post town: SWANSEA
- Postcode district: SA1
- Dialling code: 01792
- Police: South Wales
- Fire: Mid and West Wales
- Ambulance: Welsh
- UK Parliament: Swansea East
- Senedd Cymru – Welsh Parliament: Swansea East
- List of places UK Wales Swansea Map of the community

Bon-y-maen (sometimes spelt Bonymaen; Welsh: Bôn-y-maen) is a community in Swansea, Wales located about 1.5 miles (2.4 km) north east of Swansea city centre. It falls within the coterminous Bonymaen ward for elections to Swansea Council.

Bôn-y-maen is Welsh for 'base of the stone' and there are legends that the same stone ends in Penmaen (Welsh for 'stone end') on the Gower Peninsula.

Overlooking Bon-y-maen on top of Kilvey Hill is the main TV transmitter for Swansea.

The local rugby team is Bonymaen RFC.

In 2017 over 200 new homes were planned for the ex-Morris Brothers bus works in Pentrechwyth (part of Bon-y-maen).

Bon-y-maen was a Communities First area.

== See also ==
- Bon-y-maen (electoral ward)
