= Sketty =

District of Swansea, Wales

Sketty: Welsh: Sgeti
- Location within Swansea
- Population: 14,301 (2011 census)
- OS grid reference: SS626929
- Principal area: Swansea
- Preserved county: West Glamorgan
- Country: Wales
- Sovereign state: United Kingdom
- Post town: SWANSEA
- Postcode district: SA2
- Dialling code: 01792
- Police: South Wales
- Fire: Mid and West Wales
- Ambulance: Welsh
- UK Parliament: Swansea West
- Senedd Cymru – Welsh Parliament: Swansea West
- List of places UK Wales Swansea 51.618°N 03.986°W Map of the community

Sketty (Welsh: Sgeti) is a suburban district and community in Swansea, Wales, about 2 miles (3.2 km) west of the Swansea city centre on Gower Road. It falls within the Sketty council ward of Swansea.

== Description ==
The area approximates to the Vivian Road, and Sketty Green. The village is centred on Sketty Cross, which is the junction of Gower Road, Vivian Road, and Dillwyn Road. Directly on the cross, on the West Gower Road/Vivian Road junction, The Vivian pub, known as The Vivs, can be found. A second pub, The Bush, was immediately on the east side of this junction, but is now closed.

In the immediate vicinity of Sketty Cross and the nearby Eversley Road, a variety of businesses can be found. There are many shops which include a launderette, two convenience stores, several hairdressers/barbers, a hearing centre, a pharmacist, a series of cafes, and (formerly) a sub post office (which closed in 2020). The suburb also features two restaurants - Slice and Gilligans - and an array of takeaways.

One of the longest-running businesses in the area is Kristy's Bakery on Eversley Road, which was established in Sketty in the early 1940s, after moving from a bombed-out premises in the town centre.

A small public library is located on Vivian Road to the north of the cross. Located slightly further to the north is the Tycoch campus of Gower College Swansea, (a further education college) on the corner of Vivian Road and Tycoch Road.

The current site of the Bishop Gore School is on the northwestern corner of Singleton Park. The school has been located in the area on De La Beche Road since 1952. Also on De La Beche Road, the Sketty Medical Practice can be found; and on the junction with Gower Road, St. Paul's Church (Church in Wales) is situated.

Sketty comprises a mix of housing, from Victorian and Edwardian villas, through pre- and post-war semis and detached houses, to the council estate at Sketty Park.

== Origin of the name ==
Sketty is an anglicisation of the Welsh Sgeti, which is also recorded in the form Y Sgeti (literally, "the Sketty"). It has been interpreted as a corruption of "Ynys Ceti", "Ceti’s island".

In The Place Names of Wales, by Thomas Morgan of Skewen, an alternative explanation is offered: Sketty as an anglicisation of the Welsh Is Maen Keti, meaning "below Keti's stone". Keti's Stone is an old name for the Neolithic burial chamber on Cefn Bryn known also as Arthur's Stone.

== Buildings ==
The Sketty area includes a number of notable buildings. Sketty was the domain of the copper magnate Vivian family of Sketty Hall and Singleton Abbey. In the mid-19th century John Henry Vivian employed the nationally renowned architect Henry Woodyer to design buildings for the estate, of which three survive.

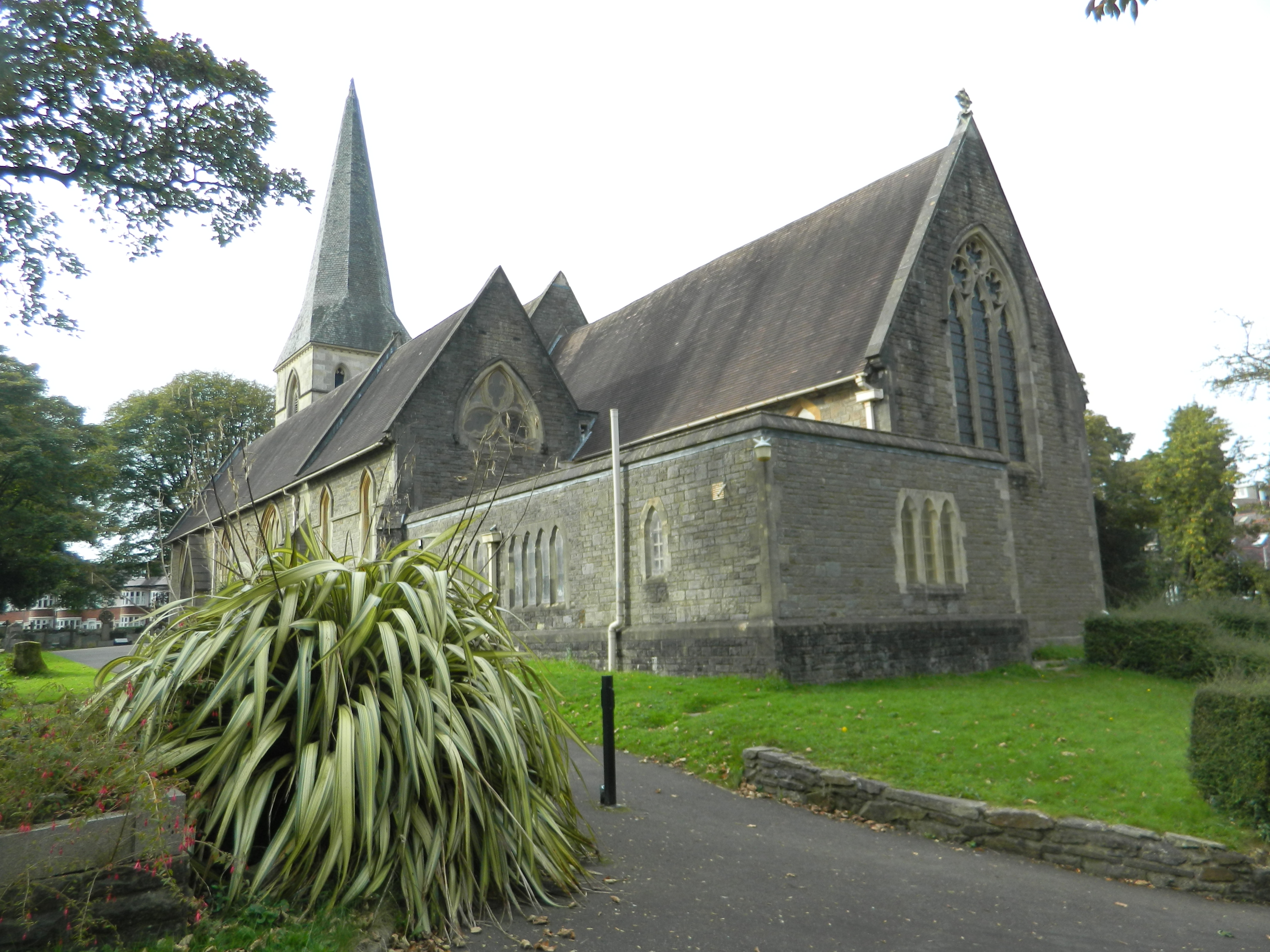
St Paul's Church

St Paul's Church was built in 1849–50 to Woodyer's design, added to in 1907 and again in 1928–9 by Glendinning Moxham. Woodyer also designed the school opposite (now known as the Stewart Hall) in 1853. His third building is Parc Beck, on the corner of Brynmill Lane. This incorporates a square, late 18th century villa named Parc Wern, made much larger, irregular and Gothic by Woodyer in 1851–3 for J. H. Vivian's son, Henry Hussey Vivian and his wife. Woodyer's designs were drastically compromised by later 19th-century heightening and elaboration. The building's current name commemorates a later owner, Roger Beck. It served as a nurses’ home before a recent conversion into flats.

St. Benedict's Roman Catholic Church, on Llythrid Avenue, was built in 1961 to a design by F. R. Bates, Son & Price. New Bethel Welsh Congregational Church, Carnglas Road, was built in 1869–70.

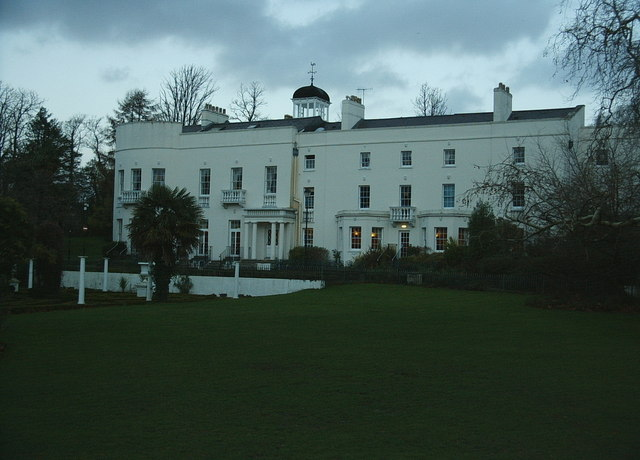
Sketty Hall

Sketty Hall, Sketty Lane, is a much-altered building dating back to the early 18th century. Also on Sketty Lane is Singleton Hospital, two ten-storey blocks by O. Garbutt Walton for the Welsh Regional Hospital Board, 1961, with later additions. Opposite is the University Sports Pavilion, a late work by Glendinning Moxham, designed 1930, built 1932.

Hendrefoelan House, on Hendrefoilan Road, is a severe grey stone mansion in the Tudor style, built c. 1860 for Lewis Llewelyn Dillwyn, MP for Swansea, by William B. Colling. It formerly housed the Adult Education Department of the Swansea University, but is now derelict.

Smaller domestic architecture worthy of note includes C.T. Ruthen's 29-47 Dillwyn Road (1905) and 1-11 De La Beche Road (1906); also Coedsaeson (1893) (now 11 Parc Wern Road) and a number of large individual houses and pairs in Gower Road (c. 1900), all attributable to Glendinning Moxham.

Lower Sketty, or Sketty Isha, or Derwen Fawr, was long dominated by the villas which industrialists and successful professional men erected overlooking Swansea Bay and the Mumbles. The spread of mid-20th-century housing estates has obliterated all but a few traces. The most significant of the villas was Sketty Park House, built c. 1818 for the Morris family from the materials of Clasemont House (1775), Sir John Morris of Morriston’s seat evacuated by the family once the fumes from their copper works and the mine workings underground became unbearable. Sketty Park House was itself demolished c. 1973, but a large Gothic belvedere from its ornamental grounds survives on a tree-covered mound in Saunders Way. Morris's descendant George Lockwood Morris the Wales rugby player lived at Machen Lodge, and his son Cedric Morris the artist and plantsman was born there.

Farther south, in Derwen Fawr Road, three white Regency villas can still be seen: Bible College, much heightened and enlarged; Emanuel School on the east side; and on the west side the best-preserved of the three, Gwern Eynon.

== Sketty Park ==
This area is centred on a council estate, although much of the housing has been bought by the former tenants under the right to buy scheme. The edges of the Sketty Park area have housing more typical of other areas of Sketty and Derwen Fawr. A parade of shops (including a barber's, food takeaway, and C.K.'s supermarket) and the Hen Dderwen public house are located in the centre of the area. Parkland Primary School and Olchfa Comprehensive School are located in the area. There is also a large church on Parkway road, Holy Trinity Church, as well as another church, Parklands Evangelical Church.

== Derwen Fawr ==
Derwen Fawr (English: Large Oak tree) is a district of south Sketty village, shown as Lower Sketty on Ordnance Survey maps. It is named after the principal road, Derwen Fawr Road, which joins the village of Sketty with Oystermouth Road. It is regarded as an up-market area, gaining its popularity because of the proximity of the sea, Singleton Park, the centre of Swansea, and the ease of access to Gower. It also has a number of well-established large houses, to which have been added a large number of more modestly sized houses.

It has a miniature model railway (open to the public on bank-holidays in the summer), and before 2009 was home to The Bible College of Wales. The edge of Derwen Fawr and Clyne Valley Country park is also the location of a civic amenity site, still open to the public. However, the attached landfill site, which was once the main facility for the City of Swansea, closed in the 1980s when the Tir John site in St. Thomas, Swansea took over as the Swansea's main refuse site.

A number of sporting facilities are located within the Derwen Fawr district. These consist of the Welsh National Swimming Pool, Blackpill Footgolf Course (formerly Blackpill Municipal Golf Links), and the King George V playing fields.
