= Pontarddulais =

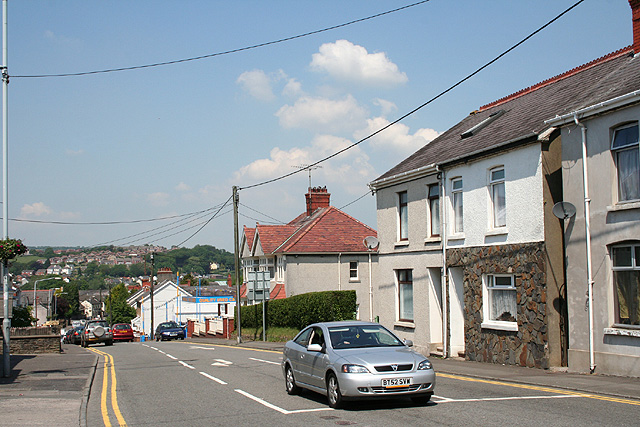

- Location within Swansea
- Population: 6,818 (2024 Census)
- OS grid reference: SN589037
- Community: Pontarddulais
- Principal area: Swansea
- Preserved county: West Glamorgan
- Country: Wales
- Sovereign state: United Kingdom
- Post town: SWANSEA
- Postcode district: SA4
- Dialling code: 01792
- Police: South Wales
- Fire: Mid and West Wales
- Ambulance: Welsh
- UK Parliament: Gower
- Senedd Cymru – Welsh Parliament: Gŵyr Abertawe
- List of places UK Wales Swansea 51.71°N 04.04°W Map of the community

Pontarddulais (Welsh pronunciation: [pɔntarˈðɨːlais]), also spelled Pontardulais (Welsh pronunciation: [pɔntarˈdɨːlais]), is a town and community in Swansea, Wales. It is 10 miles (16 km) northwest of the city centre. It is in the Pontarddulais ward of the City and County of Swansea Council. Pontarddulais adjoins the village of Hendy in Carmarthenshire. The built-up population was 9,073.

== History ==
An English translation of the name Pontarddulais is "Bridge over the Dulais", with Dulais meaning "black stream", probably due to its course through coal measures. The earlier name of Pontaberdulais referred to a dismantled 14th-century road bridge which carried the main highway between Swansea and Carmarthen over the River Loughor (Afon Llwchwr). The bridge was so named because of its position upstream of the mouth (aber) of the Dulais stream. This bridge was also known as Y Bont Fawr ("the big bridge"). The village that developed around this bridge took the shortened name of Pontardulais, also written incorrectly as Pontarddulais because of the assumption that the bridge was "over Dulais". The bridge also gave the town its nickname "Y Bont".

Most of the town lies within the parish of Llandeilo Tal-y-bont apart from the small section west of the bridge which lies in Llanedi parish. The bridge referred to in the name of Llandeilo Tal-y-bont (meaning "Saint Teilo's church at the end of the bridge") is not the same as that of Pontaberdulais. The church bridge was located near the old church on the earlier Roman road that crossed the river Loughor near Hendy. The medieval church of St Teilo was carefully dismantled stone-by-stone and reassembled in St Fagans National History Museum in Cardiff. Pontarddulais first gained attention in the wider world in 1843, during the Rebecca Riots, when rioters attacked the toll gate there, after crossing the bridge.

The path to industrialisation began in the early 19th century. In 1839 the railway arrived in the town when the Llanelli Dock Company built a line to transport anthracite coal from the Amman Valley to Llanelli. In 1866, a new line was built connecting Pontarddulais with Swansea which made the town an important railway junction. Pontarddulais was transformed from a rural settlement into an industrial community during the years 1872 to 1910 when six tinplate works were established. The population expanded greatly during this period, as workers from nearby communities and as far afield as Italy moved in to find work in the tinplate industry.

A new single-span bridge was built beside Y Bont Fawr in 1938, and the old bridge was demolished at the end of the World War II. The 1950 saw another major transformation in Pontarddulais. New, modern tinplate works in nearby Trostre and Felindre rendered the old works obsolete. The local works were taken over by other enterprises and redeveloped as light industry. However, they did not replace all the jobs lost due to the closure of the local tin plate works. Some of the local people had to find work elsewhere. Light industry gradually began deserting Pontarddulais in the late 20th century, transforming the community into a dormitory village.

== Education ==
The town's schools are Pontarddulais primary school, Pontarddulais Comprehensive School (both English medium) and Bryniago School, a Welsh medium primary school.

== Transport ==
Pontarddulais railway station is on the Heart of Wales Line, with trains to Swansea to the south and Shrewsbury to the north. The A48 traverses the town as St Teilo Street and Bolgoed Road. Junction 48 of the M4 Motorway serves Pontarddulais. There is also a frequent bus (the X13) that pick ups going between Swansea and Ammanford.

== Media and culture ==
Pontarddulais hosts many cultural events throughout the year, including Pontarddulais and Hendy carnival, which makes its way from Hendy Industrial Estate to Coed Bach Park in Pontarddulais on the last Saturday of June. Also held in the town is Pontarddulais Show, an agricultural show held on August Bank Holiday, and the Classic Car and Motor Show, held in September, both of which take place at Pontarddulais Agricultural Show Ground.

Pontarddulais is home to Côr Meibion Pontarddulais or Pontarddulais Male Choir, the most successful competitive choir in Wales, having won the main choir prize at the Welsh National Eisteddfod a record 15 times and the International Eisteddfod prize on two occasions. The choir also performed choral parts in the Pink Floyd film The Wall. and recorded with Roger Waters on his hit single "The Tide is Turning".

Local radio stations covering Pontraddulais include Hits Radio South Wales, its sister station Greatest Hits Radio South Wales, Swansea Bay Radio, Heart South Wales and Nation Radio Wales.

Pontarddulais is also home to Pontardulais Town Band. The band has many national and local accolades, and is one of the oldest town brass bands in Wales. The band continues to support local events, such as the Hendy and Pontarddulais carnival, and Remembrance Day Parades. Pontardulais Town Band won the Championship Section at the South East Wales Brass Band Association contest on 21 November 2009, held in the Blaenavon Workingmen's Hall. It was the first time for over 50 years that the Pontardulais Town Band has won a Class A or championship contest in Wales. The last time the band was ranked Class A was in 1958 when they represented Wales at the National Finals playing Variations on a Shining River, arranged by Frank Wright. The band finished the year joint runners-up in the championship section for the 2009 competitive year. In March 2010 the band competed in the Welsh Regional Championships in the Brangwyn Hall in Swansea and they attained 1st place in the first section resulting in them qualifying for the National Brass Band Championships of Great Britain. The band's current musical director is Paul Jenkins.

Some well-known literary figures have associations with Pontarddulais, including Edward Thomas and Dylan Thomas, who had several aunts and uncles in the town. It has been suggested that Dylan based part of his filmscript, Rebecca's Daughters, on the riots in the Bont. His lifelong friend, Wynford Vaughan Thomas, was the grandson of Daniel Lewis, one of the Rebecca leaders.

In 2014, the town was rated one of the most attractive postcode areas to live in Wales.

== Welsh language ==
According to the 2011 census, 31.6% of the community of Pontarddulais stated that they could speak Welsh. The Welsh Language Society Cymdeithas yr Iaith was established in Pontarddulais on 4 August 1962 and a commemorative plaque unveiled in 2013.

== Notable residents ==
- Ieuan Evans, Wales and British Lion rugby international
- John Walters, from Fforest, produced English/Welsh Dictionary 1770-94
- Eifion Jones, Glamorgan county cricketer
- Derwyn Jones, Wales rugby international
- Terry Price, Hendy, Wales, British Lion rugby international
- Robert Croft, from Fforest, Glamorgan county and England cricketer
- James Harris, Glamorgan county cricketer
- Dennis O'Neill, tenor
- David Cuthbert Thomas, (1895 – 18 March 1916) Welsh soldier of the First World War
- Tony Chappel, former Welsh professional snooker player
- David James Jones, Welsh philosopher
- Brett Johns, Mixed martial artist
- Jeremy Miles, Member of the Senedd and Welsh Government Minister

== Twinning ==
- Hourtin, Gironde, France
- Cobh, County Cork, Ireland

== Redevelopment ==
A £30 million redevelopment was agreed early in 2008, for a new road next to the town with shops and housing. Several supermarkets expressed an interest in having a superstore in the town, with enthusiastic support from shopkeepers in the local area. Tesco opened the 45,000 sq ft (4,200 m^{2}) store on 10 October 2011.
