= Gowerton =

Gowerton: Welsh: Tre-gŵyr
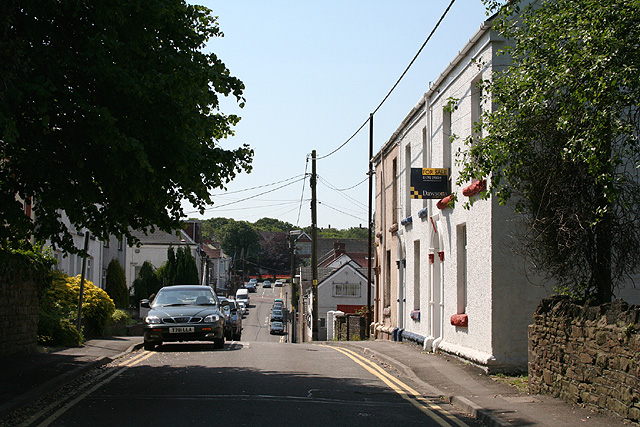

- Location within Swansea
- Population: 8,183
- OS grid reference: SS595965
- Principal area: Swansea
- Preserved county: West Glamorgan
- Country: Wales
- Sovereign state: United Kingdom
- Post town: SWANSEA
- Postcode district: SA4
- Dialling code: 01792
- Police: South Wales
- Fire: Mid and West Wales
- Ambulance: Welsh
- UK Parliament: Gower
- Senedd Cymru – Welsh Parliament: Gŵyr Abertawe
- List of places UK Wales Swansea 51.648°N 4.043°W Map of the community

Gowerton (Welsh: Tre-gŵyr) is a large village and community, about 4 miles (6 km) northwest of Swansea city centre, Wales. Gowerton is often known as the gateway to the Gower Peninsula. Gowerton's original name was Ffosfelin. The village falls within the Gowerton electoral ward of the City and County of Swansea Council, which elects one councillor. The community had a population of 5,212 and the built-up area with Waunarlwydd 8,183.

In 1980, the Welsh National Eisteddfod (named after Dyffryn Lliw, see below) was held at the Elba sports complex in the village. The Eisteddfod stone (Gorsedd stones) is located on the roundabout (grid ref. 585966) on the B4295 road to Penclawdd.

== Geography ==
Nearby villages/towns are Penclawdd (west), Three Crosses and Dunvant (south), Waunarlwydd (east, contiguous with Gowerton), Gorseinon (north) and Loughor (north-west).

From 1974 to 1996, Gowerton was part of the district of Lliw Valley (Dyffryn Lliw) within West Glamorgan.

People from Gowerton are often referred to as "starch". When the local area processed steel for export, the steel owners and white-collar workers lived in the Gowerton area; hence the name "starch". On the other hand, many of the manual workers resided in neighbouring Penclawdd and are known by the affectionate term "donks".

Gowerton is twinned with La Gacilly in Brittany, France.

== Politics ==
Gowerton elects a community council of thirteen members in two wards: East and West.

== Education ==
Gowerton has three schools: Gowerton Primary school, Gowerton Comprehensive School and Ysgol Gyfun Gŵyr (Welsh medium comprehensive school).

== Religion ==
Gowerton once had five church or chapel buildings: St John's Church (built 1882), Tabernacl (opened 1893) Temple United Reformed Church (opened 1888), Bethel (opened 1873) and Bethania (opened 1891). However, only two, St John's Church and Temple URC, still remain. Bethel has lain in ruins for two decades and both Tabernacl and Bethania have been demolished.

== Transport ==
Bus services are provided by First Cymru and NAT. These depart Gowerton from Hill Street.

First Cymru provide a half-hourly service (no. 16) through the village to Swansea and Gorseinon.

Gowerton railway station is on the West Wales Line, between Swansea and Llanelli. Gowerton once had two railway stations, but today only one remains. This was made single-track in 1986. Work began in November 2012 to restore the double track to Gowerton by mid-2013, this has now been completed.

== Sport ==
The local rugby club is Gowerton RFC.

Gowerton's Elba Sports Complex is home to Swansea Senior League Second Division, Gowerton FC.

Gowerton has a golf range and a nine-hole, par 3 golf course.

== See also ==
- Villages in Gower
