= Swansea Council =

Local government of Swansea

Swansea Council Cyngor Abertawe (Welsh)

Type
- Type: Principal council of Swansea

History
- Founded: 1 April 1996
- Preceded by: West Glamorgan County Council; Swansea City Council; Lliw Valley Borough Council

Leadership
- Lord Mayor: Penny Matthews, Labour since 16 May 2026
- Leader: Rob Stewart, Labour since 9 September 2014
- Chief Executive: Martin Nicholls since 21 November 2022

Structure
- Seats: 75 councillors
- Graph of the party split among 75 seats.
- Political groups: Administration (44) Labour (44) Other parties (31) Liberal Democrats (14) Conservative (5) Uplands (2) Green (1) Independent (9)
- Length of term: 5 years

Elections
- Voting system: First past the post
- Last election: 5 May 2022
- Next election: 6 May 2027

Meeting place
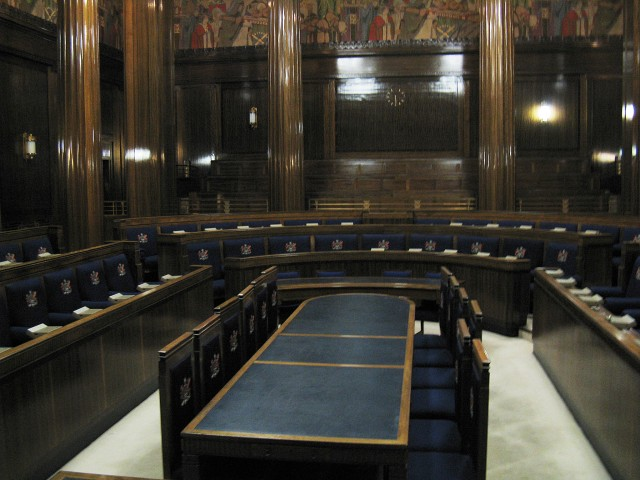
- Guildhall, Swansea

Website
- www.swansea.gov.uk

Swansea Council (Welsh: Cyngor Abertawe), formally the City and County of Swansea Council (Welsh: Cyngor Dinas a Sir Abertawe), is the local authority for the city and county of Swansea, one of the principal areas of Wales. The principal area also includes rural areas to the north of the built-up area of Swansea and the Gower Peninsula to the west. The council consists of 75 councillors representing 32 electoral wards.

Since 2012 the council has been controlled by the Labour Party.

== History ==
Swansea was an ancient borough. The town's first charter was granted sometime between 1158 and 1184 by William de Newburgh, 3rd Earl of Warwick. The charter granted the townsmen (called burgesses) certain rights to develop the area. A second charter was granted in 1215 by King John. The borough was reformed under the Municipal Corporations Act 1835 to become a municipal borough.

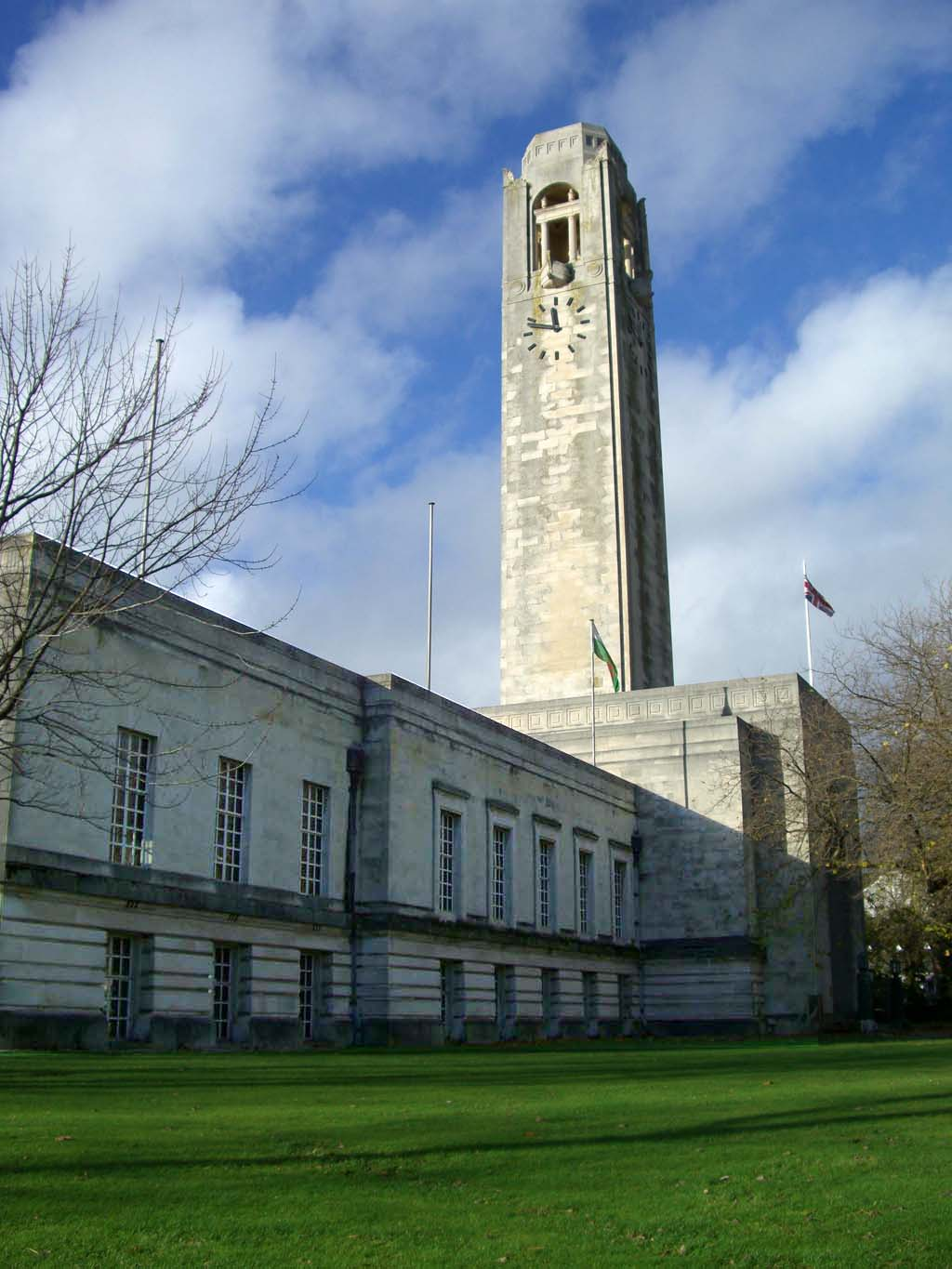
The Guildhall, the Council's meeting place

When elected county councils were established in 1889 under the Local Government Act 1888, Swansea was considered large enough to run its own county-level services, and so it became a county borough, independent from Glamorgan County Council. Swansea County Borough Council was the local authority from 1889 until 1974. It gained city status in 1969, allowing the council to call itself Swansea City Council.

In 1974, under the Local Government Act 1972, Swansea became a lower-tier district council, with the new West Glamorgan County Council providing county-level services. The district of Swansea created in 1974 was larger than the old county borough, also covering the area of the abolished Gower Rural District. In 1996, under the Local Government (Wales) Act 1994, further local government reform saw West Glamorgan County Council abolished and the district of Swansea merged with parts of the Lliw Valley district to form a unitary authority, called the 'City and County of Swansea' (Welsh: Dinas a Sir Abertawe.)

== Political control ==
The first election to the new council was held in 1995, initially operating as a shadow authority before coming into its powers on 1 April 1996. Political control of the council since 1996 has been as follows:

Party in control	Years
Labour	1996–2004
No overall control	2004–2012
Labour	2012–present

=== Leadership ===
The role of Lord Mayor of Swansea is largely ceremonial. Political leadership is provided by the leader of the council. The first leader following the reforms in 1996, Tom Jones, was the last leader of West Glamorgan County Council. The leaders of Swansea Council since 1996 have been:

Councillor	Party	From	To
Tom Jones	Labour	1 Apr 1996	28 Jul 1997
Mike Hedges	Labour	1997	2001
Lawrence Bailey	Labour	2001	Jun 2004
Chris Holley	Liberal Democrats	Jun 2004	May 2012
David Phillips	Labour	May 2012	28 Aug 2014
Rob Stewart	Labour	9 Sep 2014	

=== Composition ===
Following the 2022 election and subsequent changes of allegiance up to June 2026, the composition of the council was:

Party	Seats
Labour	44
Liberal Democrats	14
Conservative	5
Uplands	2
Green	1
Independents@Swansea	1
Independent	8
Total	75

The Liberal Democrats, local party Independents@Swansea, and four of the independent councillors sit together as the 'Liberal Democrats and Independent Opposition Group'. The other four independent councillors are not aligned to a group. The next election is due in 2027.

== Elections ==
Since 2012, elections have taken place every five years. The last election was 5 May 2022.

Year	Seats	Labour	Liberal Democrats	Conservative	Plaid Cymru	Green	Independent	Notes
1995	72	57	6	1	0	0	8	Labour majority control
1999	72	45	11	4	3	0	9	Labour majority control
2004	72	32	19	4	5	0	12	No overall control; "Swansea Administration" coalition
2008	72	30	23	4	1	0	14	No overall control; "Swansea Administration" coalition
2012	72	49	12	4	0	0	7	Labour majority control
2017	72	48	7	8	0	0	9	Labour majority control
2022	75	45	11	7	0	1	11	Labour majority control

Party with the most elected councillors in bold. Coalition agreements in notes column.

Between 1996 and 2004, the council was under Labour control. Between 2004 and 2012 there was no overall control and the council was led by a coalition of the Liberal Democrats, Independents and the Conservatives, termed the Swansea Administration. Labour regained control of the council at the 2012 election and retained control at the 2017 and 2022 elections.

=== Electoral wards ===
Following a local government boundary review, the number of wards in Swansea was reduced from 36 to 32. The changes took effect from the 2022 local elections. The boundaries of 15 wards remained unchanged, but a number of other wards were merged, or radically altered, with new wards such as Mumbles and Waterfront created.

The following table lists the post-2022 county/community wards, the numbers of councillors elected and the communities they cover. Communities with a community council are indicated with a '*':

Ward	County Councillors	Communities (Parishes)	Places covered
Bishopston^{c}	1	Bishopston*	Barland Common, Caswell, Bishopston, Clyne Common, Manselfield, Murton, Oldway
Bon-y-maen^{c}	2	Bon-y-maen	Pentrechwyth, Pentre Dwr, Winch Wen
Castle^{c}	4	Castle	Swansea city centre, Brynmelin, Dyfatty, Mount Pleasant (part) and Sandfields
Clydach	3	Clydach*, Mawr* (Craig-Cefn-Parc ward)	Clydach, Craig-cefn-parc, Faerdre, Glais (East) and Penydre
Cockett^{c}	3	Cockett	Cadle, Cwmdu (part), Coedweig, Gendros, Gors, Fforestfach
Cwmbwrla^{c}	3	Cwmbwrla	Brondeg, Brynhyfryd, Cwmdu, Gendros, Manselton
Dunvant and Killay	3	Dunvant, Killay	Dunvant, Killay
Fairwood	1	Upper Killay*, Llanrhidian Higher* (Three Crosses ward)	Upper Killay, Three Crosses
Gorseinon and Penyrheol	3	Gorseinon*, Grovesend and Waungron	Gorseinon town, Grovesend, Waungron
Gower	1	Llangennith, Llanmadoc and Cheriton*, Llanrhidian Lower*, Penrice*, Port Eynon*, Reynoldston,* Rhossili*	Cheriton, Fairyhill, Horton, Knelston, Landimore, Llanddewi, Llangennith, Llanmadoc, Llanrhidian, Middleton, Nicholaston, Oldwalls, Overton, Oxwich Green, Oxwich, Penrice, Port Eynon, Reynoldston, Rhossili, Grovesend, Llanmorlais, Pentrebach, Pont-Lliw, Poundffald, Slade
Gowerton^{c}	2	Gowerton*	Gowerton village, Penclawdd
Landore^{c}	2	Landore	Hafod, Landore, Morfa, Plasmarl
Llangyfelach	1	Llangyfelach*, Mawr* (Felindre ward)	Felindre, Llangyfelach, Tyn-y-cwm
Llansamlet	4	Llansamlet, Birchgrove	Birchgrove, Glais, Heol Las, Llansamlet, Morriston, Talycoppa, Summerhill and Trallwn
Llwchwr^{c}	3	Llwchwr*	Loughor
Mayals	1	Mumbles* (Mayals ward)	Blackpill, Mayals
Morriston^{c}	5	Morriston	Caemawr, Cwmrhydyceirw, Morriston town, Parc Gwernfadog, Pant-lasau, Ynysforgan and Ynystawe
Mumbles	3	Mumbles* (Newton and Oystermouth wards)	Langland, Mumbles, Newton, Oystermouth, Thistleboon
Mynydd-bach^{c}	3	Mynyddbach	Clase, Clasemont, Park View Estate, Penfillia Estate, Treboeth, Tirdeunaw, Pinewood, Mynydd Garnlywd and Bryn Rock
Pen-clawdd	1	Llanrhidian Higher*	Blue Anchor, Llanmorlais, Penclawdd, Crofty and Wernffrwd
Penderry^{c}	3	Penderry	Penlan, Portmead, Blaen-y-Maes, Fforesthall, Tre-boeth and Caereithin
Penllergaer^{c}	1	Penllergaer*	Penllergaer
Pennard	1	Pennard*, Ilston*	Bishopston, Fairwood Common, Kittle, Parkmill, Penmaen, Southgate
Pontarddulais	2	Pontarddulais*, Mawr (Garnswllt ward)	Pontarddulais town, Garnswllt, Pentrebach
Pontlliw and Tircoed^{c}	1	Pontlliw and Tircoed*	Pontlliw, Tircoed
St. Thomas^{c}	2	St. Thomas	Dan-y-graig, Port Tennant, Kilvey Hill and the Grenfell Park Area, St. Thomas
Sketty^{c}	5	Sketty	Carnglas, Clyne Valley (Gwerneinon), Derwen Fawr, Hendrefoilan, Killay, Singleton Park, Sketty village, Tycoch, Cwmgwyn
Townhill^{c}	3	Townhill	Cwm-Gwyn, Mayhill, Mount Pleasant, Townhill
Uplands^{c}	4	Uplands	Brynmill, St. Helens, Cwmgwyn, Ffynone and The Lons, Uplands
Waterfront^{c}	1	Waterfront	Maritime Quarter, SA1 Swansea Waterfront
Waunarlwydd^{c}	1	Waunarlwydd	Waunarlwydd
West Cross	2	Mumbles* (West Cross ward)	Norton, West Cross

* = Communities which elect a community council
^{c} = Ward coterminous with community of the same name

== Council premises ==
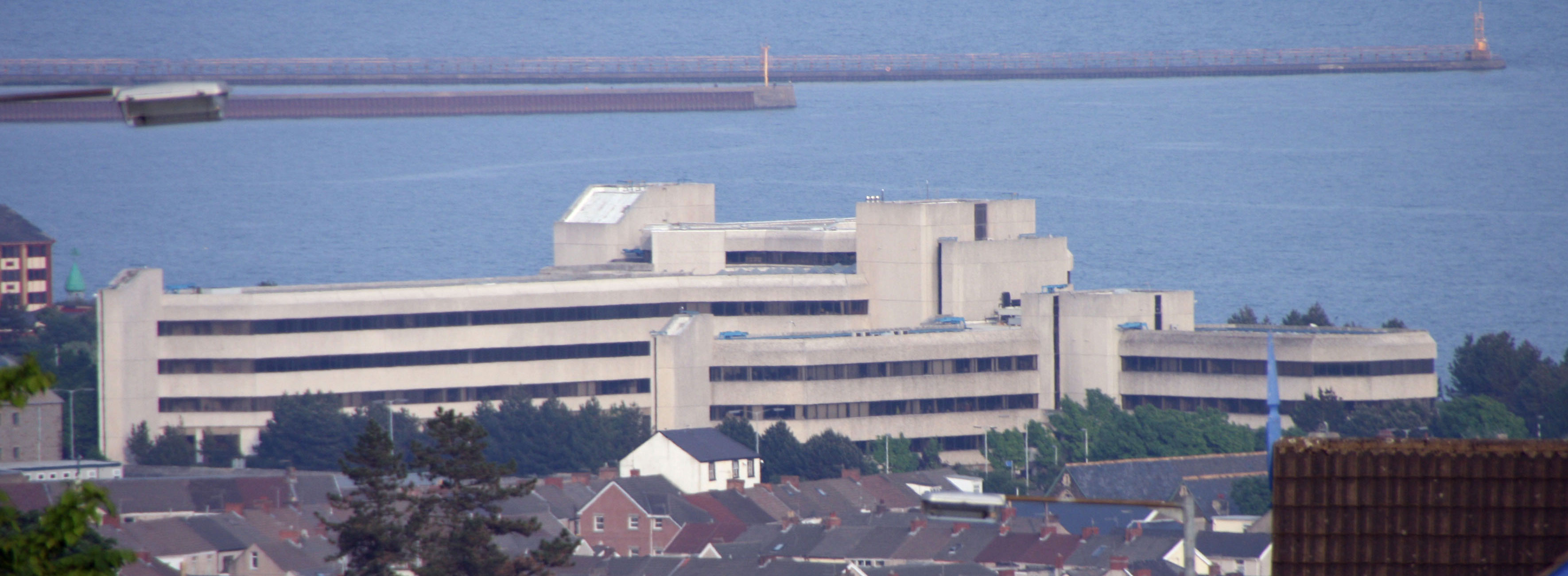
Civic Centre, Oystermouth Road, Swansea, SA1 3SN: Council's main offices

Council meetings are generally held at Swansea Guildhall, which was completed in 1934 for the old county borough council. The council's main offices are at the Civic Centre, on Oystermouth Road, overlooking Swansea Bay. The Civic Centre was completed in 1982 as County Hall for the former West Glamorgan County Council.

- Mansion House
- Palace Theatre, Swansea

== Mayoralty ==
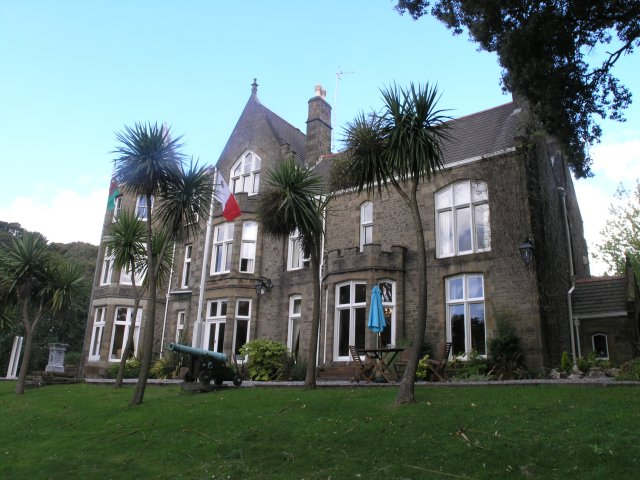
Mansion House, Ffynone

The Lord Mayor of Swansea (Welsh: Arglwydd Faer Abertawe) is a senior member of the elected Council. Swansea has had a Mayor since it became a borough in 1835. The dignity of Lord Mayor was conferred on the city by Queen Elizabeth II on 22 March 1982 to celebrate the wedding of Charles, Prince of Wales. The status was confirmed on 1 April 1996 when the Unitary Authority of the City and County of Swansea came into being.

The style of the Lord Mayor is "The Right Worshipful the Lord Mayor of Swansea". The official residence is the Mansion House in Ffynone, which was originally built as the home of a previous mayor, Evan Matthew Richards. It was purchased by the then County Borough of Swansea in 1922 and renamed the Mansion House.

== Corporate identity ==
=== Logo ===
The logo of the City and County of Swansea depicts a stylised Osprey. It is shown with the name of the council written beneath it or beside it, both in Welsh (Cyngor Abertawe) and English (Swansea Council). An older version of the logo displayed the text written in a ring around the Osprey pictogram.

=== Coat of arms ===
The official coat of arms used by the council today were granted by the College of Arms in 1922. The motto is 'Floreat Swansea'.

The Arms are blazoned as follows:

Per Fess wavy Azure and barry wavy of six Argent, of the first a double-towered Castle or, in Chief on an Inescutcheon of the third a Lion passant guardant Gules; And for the Crest, On a Wreath of the Colours an Osprey rising holding in the Beak a Fish proper; Supporters: on the dexter side a Lion Gules gorged with a Mural Crown or, and on the sinister side a Dragon Gules gorged with a Mural Crown or'.

The Arms are symbolic to an extent: the blue and white wavy bars represent the sea, since Swansea is a port town; the Castle represents the Medieval fortifications of the Town; the lion as dexter supporter and on the Inescutcheon commemorates the link with the de Breos family; and the dragon as sinister supporter is the National Emblem of Wales and is a supporter in the Achievement of Arms of the present Lord Swansea.

In April 1974, the City of Swansea was merged with the Gower Rural District to form the new District and City of Swansea. The Arms granted to the Corporation of the County Borough of Swansea in 1922 were transferred unchanged to the new City Council in May 1975. The Certificate of Transfer of the College of Arms dated 11 March 1976 confirmed the re-granting of the Arms. With the 1996 reorganisation of local government, the arms were transferred a second time to the present City Council.

== See also ==
- List of portreeves and mayors of Swansea
- List of parliamentary constituencies in West Glamorgan
