= Landore (electoral ward) =

Coordinates: 51.64678°N 3.93813°W

Landore Ward
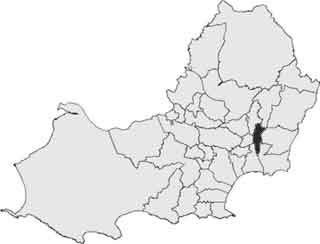
- Area: 2.23 km^{2} (0.86 sq mi)
- Population: 6,168 (2011 census)
  - Density: 2,766/km^{2} (7,160/sq mi)
- Principal area: Swansea
- Preserved county: West Glamorgan
- Country: Wales
- Sovereign state: United Kingdom
- UK Parliament: Swansea East
- Senedd Cymru – Welsh Parliament: Swansea East
- Councillors: Beverly Hopkins (Labour); Mike White (Labour)

Landore (Welsh: Glandŵr) is an electoral ward in the City and County of Swansea, Wales, UK.

== Description ==
Landore is bounded by the wards of Castle to the south west; Cwmbwrla to the west; Mynydd-Bach to the north west; Morriston to the north; Bonymaen to the east; and St. Thomas to the south east.

The electoral ward consists of some or all of the following areas: Castle Graig, Brynhyfryd, Hafod, Landore, Morfa and Plasmarl, in the parliamentary constituency of Swansea East. However the Landore ward can be split into three chief areas from north to south: Plasmarl, Landore and Hafod.

For electoral purposes, Landore is divided into a number of polling districts: Plasmarl, Cnap Llwyd, Glandwr and Hafod.

The Elected Councillors for the Landore Ward are Cllr Viv Abbott (Liberal Democrat) and Cllr Rob Speht (Liberal Democrat).

=== Districts ===
Landore

Landore is a residential area. It has seen a number of new developments during the early millennium decade, such as the Liberty Stadium, now the Swansea.com Stadium, which opened in 2005 and a new out-of-town retail park built around the same time.

Morfa

Morfa is a former area of light industry, which is now dominated by a retail park in the north western part of the ward.

Hafod

Hafod is a small area to the far south of the ward.

== 2012 local council elections ==
For the 2012 local council elections, the turnout in Landore was 35.10%. The results were:

Candidate	Party	Votes	Status
Beverly Hopkins	Labour	1040	Labour gain
Mike White	Labour	1030	Labour gain
Vivian Abbott	Liberal Democrat	472	
Rob Speht	Liberal Democrat	423	
Roger Berry	Independent	77	
Kate Horton	Conservatives	39	
Henri Lloyd Davies	Conservatives	28	

== Swansea County Borough Council ==
Landore was one of the ten wards created to Swansea County Borough Council, electing two representatives in the November 1889 elections.

== See also ==
- Lower Swansea valley
