= List of portreeves and mayors of Swansea =

This is a list of chief civic officers of Swansea in south Wales, who were entitled portreeve until 1835 (except for a short period with mayors 1655-59), mayor 1835-1982, and lord mayor since 1982.

Swansea was the chief town of the medieval marcher Lordship of Gower and was granted borough status in the twelfth century. The origins of the office of portreeve are unclear but the role is mentioned in a charter of 1306. The Municipal Corporations Act 1835 reformed local government and established the office of mayor.

Swansea became a county borough in 1888, was granted city status in 1969, became a City and District within the new county of West Glamorgan in 1974, and a unitary City and County in 1996. Over this time its boundaries have expanded to include most of the ancient lordship of Gower.

== Portreeves before Cromwell ==
Portreeves were elected at Michaelmas (29 September) each year.

Term	Name
1432-33	John Dawkin
1462-63	William Thomas
1476-77	John Thomas
1477-78	John Fourboure
1478-79	John Cradock
1487-88	David Melyn
1499-1500	John Elishe
1500-01	Robert Rees
1545-46	Thomas ap Evan
1547-48	John Thomas Sadler
1551-52	Owen Taylor
1553-54	John Thomas Flemynge
1557-58	David Emlet
1559-60	John Thomas Flemynge
1560-61	Roger Jankin
1561-62	Richard Yeroth
1562-63	Thomas Sadler
1563-64	John Franklen
1567-68	William Watkins
1568-69	John Thomas Sadler, the younger
1569-70	John Thomas Flemynge
1573-74	Ryse ap John ap Ieuan
1580-81	Sir William Herbert
1581-82	Thomas Sadler
1582-83	Robert Price
1583-84	Robert Smyth
1584-85	Philip Hughes
1585-86	Thomas Owen
1587-88	Owen Philipp
1589-90	Thomas Owen
1590-91	Owen Price
1591-92	Thomas Owen
1592-93	William Flemynge
1593-94	Thomas Johns
1594-95	George Herbert
1596-97	William John Harry
1597-98	John Morgan
1598-99	Richard Sadler
1599-1600	Jenkin Franklen
1600-01	Owen Philippe
1601-02	William Flemynge
1602-03	William John Harry
1603-04	Jenkin Franklen
1604-05	John Thomas Bevan
1605-06	John David Edwards
1606-07	William Watkins
1607-08	John Daniel
1608-09	George Herbert
1609-10	John Robartes
1610-11	William John Harry
1611-12	John Davids
1612-13	John David
1613-14	Henry Flemynge
1614-15	John Daniell
1615-16	Walter Thomas
1616-17	William John Harry
1617-18	John David
1618-19	Owen Price
1619-20	Mathew Francklen
1620-21	John Daniel
1621-22	Harry Vaughan
1622-23	John William John
1623-24	Owen Price
1624-25	Henry Flemynge
1625-26	Walter Thomas
1626-27	Rice David
1627-28	Patrick Jones
1628-29	Mathew Francklen
1629-30	John Bennett
1630-31	John Williams
1631-32	Rice David
1632-33	Francis Affter
1633-34	David Jones
1634-35	Patrick Jones
1635-36	Mathew Francklen
1636-37	John Williams
1637-38	Patrick Jones
1638-39	Mathew Francklen
1639-40	Lewis Jones
1640-41	John Williams
1641-42	Patrick Jones
1642-43	Mathew Francklen
1643-44	Lewis Jones
1644-45	John Williams
1645-46	Patrick Jones
1646-47	John Daniel
1647-48	John Bowen
1648-49	William Bayly
1649-50	Mathew Francklen
1650-51	Lewis Jones
1651-52	Mathew Davies
1652-53	Thomas Williams
1653-54	John Daniel
1654-55	John Bayly or William Bayly

== Mayors under Cromwell ==
In 1655 Lord Protector Oliver Cromwell, who was also Lord of Gower, issued a charter with a new constitution for Swansea with a mayor as chief officer. This lapsed the year after his death.

Term	Name
1655-56	Lewis Jones
1656-57	John Daniel
1657-58	William Bayly
1658-59	Thomas Williams

== Portreeves after Cromwell ==
Term	Name
1659–60	William Jones
1660–61	Leyson Seys
1661–62	Leyson Seys
1662–63	Leyson Seys
1663–64	Isaac Affter
1664–65	William Vaughan
1665–66	William Bayly
1666–67	Lewis Jones
1667–68	Isaac Affter
1668–69	Robert Jones
1669–70	Gamaliel Hughes
1670–71	William Thomas
1671–72	David Bevans
1672–73	Lewis Jones
1673–74	Isaac Affter
1674–75	William Herbert
1675–76	Robert Jones
1676–77	Gamaliel Hughes
1677–78	William Thomas
1678–79	Thomas Phillips
1679–80	Thomas Phillips
1680–81	Thomas Phillips
1681–82	Thomas Phillips
1682–83	Thomas Phillips
1683–84	Thomas Phillips
1684–85	Thomas Phillips
1685–86	Thomas Phillips
1686–87	Thomas Phillips
1687–88	Thomas Phillips
1688–89	Thomas Phillips
1689–90	Gamaliel Hughes
1690–91	Owen Rogers
1691–92	Owen Rogers
1692–93	Jenkin Jones
1693–94	William Seys
1694–95	Edward Mansell
1695–96	Edward Mansell
1696–97	John Francklen
1697–98	William Seys
1698–99	George Rice
1699–1700	Owen Rogers
1700–01	John Reece
1701–02	David Jones
1702–03	Jenkin Jones
1703–04	Lewis Thomas
1704–05	Walter Hughes
1705–06	Gabriel Powell
1706–07	Christopher Rogers
1707–08	Griffith Phillip
1708–09	David Thomas
1709–10	Griffith Phillip
1710–11	John Rice
1711–12	Joseph Ayres
1712–13	Jenkin Jones
1713–14	Gabriel Powell
1714–15	Walter Hughes
1715–16	Walter Hughes
1716–17	Abraham Ayres
1717–18	Anthony Cupitt
1718–19	Richard Parry
1719–20	Griffith Phillips
1720–21	John Mansell
1721–22	Walter Hughes, the younger
1722–23	Walter Hughes
1723–24	Robert Rogers
1724–25	David Thomas
1725–26	William Philips
1726–27	Gabriel Powell
1727–28	Walter Hughes
1728–29	Robert Hughes
1729–30	Abraham Ayres (died); Walter Vaughn
1730–31	Walter Vaughn
1731–32	John Mansell
1732–33	William Watkins
1733–34	John Powell
1734–35	Walter Hughes
1735–36	Walter Vaughn
1736–37	John France
1737–38	John Morgan
1738–39	Walter Vaughn
1739–40	Hugh Powell
1740–41	Gabriel Powell
1741–42	John Mansell
1742–43	John Collins
1743–44	John Powell
1744–45	John France
1745–46	Richard Powell
1746–47	John Powell
1747–48	John Whitney
1748–49	Edward Phillips
1749–50	John Morgan
1750–51	Hugh Powell
1751–52	Walter Vaughn
1752–53	John Collins
1753–54	John Jenkins
1754–55	Hopkin Walter
1755–56	Christopher Rogers
1756–57	John France
1757–58	James Thomas
1758–59	Walter Vaughn
1759–60	John Collins
1760–61	John Jenkins
1761–62	Hopkin Walter; Philip Rogers
1762–63	Christopher Rogers; John Gwyther; James Thomas
1763–64	James Thomas
1764–65	David Vaughn
1765–66	Robert Ball
1766–67	William Davies
1767–68	Thomas Madocks
1768–69	William Powell
1769–70	William Jeffreys
1770–71	Iltid Thomas
1771–72	Philip Rogers
1772–73	James Thomas
1773–74	William Davies
1774–75	Thomas Madocks
1775–76	Gabriel Jeffreys
1776–77	Gabriel Powell the younger
1777–78	William Jeffreys
1778–79	Thomas Powell
1779–80	Iltid Thomas
1780–81	William Powell
1781–82	Philip Rogers
1782–83	Thomas Harcourt Powell; Rowland Prichard; Phillip Rogers
1783–84	Rowland Prichard
1784–85	Thomas Maddocks
1785–86	Thomas Maddocks
1786–87	Gabriel Jeffreys
1787–88	William Powell
1788–89	John Roberts
1789–90	Griffith Jenkins
1790–91	William Grove
1791–92	Thomas Morgan
1792–93	William Jeffreys
1793–94	Rowland Prichard
1794–95	William Jones
1795–96	Gabriel Powell
1796–97	Gabriel Jeffreys
1797–98	Thomas Powell
1798–99	Thomas Maddocks
1799–1800	Griffith Jenkins
1800–01	William Grove
1801–02	Thomas Morgan
1802–03	Charles Collins
1803–04	John Jeffreys
1804–05	William Jeffreys
1805–06	Rowland Prichard
1806–07	William Jones
1807–08	Gabriel Jeffreys
1808–09	Griffith Jenkins
1809–10	Sir John Morris
1810–11	William Grove
1811–12	John Morris
1812–13	Charles Collins
1813–14	William Jeffreys
1814–15	John Jeffreys
1815–16	John Grove
1816–17	Robert Nelson Thomas
1817–18	Thomas Edward Thomas
1818–19	William Grove
1819–20	Griffith Jenkins
1820–21	John Jones
1821–22	John Charles Collins, MD
1822–23	William Grove
1823–24	Calvert Richard Jones
1824–25	Richard Jeffreys
1825–26	Lewis Thomas
1826–27	Gabriel Powell
1827–28	Sir John Morris
1828–29	John Grove
1829–30	Thomas Thomas
1830–31	Charles Collins
1831–32	Thomas Grove
1832–33	Thomas Edward Thomas
1833–34	Silvanus Padley
1834–35	Calvert Richard Jones
1835–36	Calvert Richard Jones

== Modern mayors ==
Local government in England and Wales was reformed under the Municipal Corporations Act 1835 and the new reformed borough was headed by a mayor instead of a portreeve. Mayors were originally elected on 9th November each year, but the Representation of the People Act 1948 moved the beginning of the municipal year to May with effect from 1949.

Mayors commemorated in Swansea Guildhall

Term	Name
1835–36	Nathaniel Cameron
1836–37	Nathaniel Cameron
1837–38	Richard Mansel Phillips
1838–39	John Grove
1839–40	Lewis Weston Dillwyn
1840–41	Matthew Moggridge
1841–42	Richard Aubrey
1842–43	George Gwynne Bird
1843–44	Starling Benson
1844–45	John Richardson
1845–46	Charles Henry Smith
1846–47	Timothy Brimble Essery
1847–48	Lewis Llewelyn Dillwyn
1848–49	Michael John Michael
1849–50	Christopher James
1850–51	Owen Gething Williams
1851–52	Thomas Edward Thomas
1852–53	John Joce Strick
1853–54	George Grant Francis
1854–55	John Trevillian Jenkin
1855–56	Evan Matthew Richards
1856–57	John Oakshot
1857–58	William Henry Michael
1858–59	John Trevillian Jenkin
1859–60	Thomas Edward Thomas
1860–61	John Crow Richardson
1861–62	John Trevillian Jenkin
1862–63	Evan Matthew Richards
1863–64	Charles Bath
1864–65	Jeremiah Clarke Richardson
1865–66	George Burden Strick
1866–67	Thomas Phillips
1867–68	George Browne Brock
1868–69	Charles Thomas Wilson
1869–70	John Jones Jenkins
1870–71	Washington Hamilton Brown
1871–72	John Glasbrook
1872–73	Thomas Ford
1873–74	Thomas Powell
1874–75	Frank Ash Yeo
1875–76	James Livingston
1876–77	John Ivor Evans
1877–78	Wiliam Thomas
1878–79	James Rogers
1879–80	John Jones Jenkins
1880–81	John Jones Jenkins
1881–82	Thomas Davies
1882–83	Edward Rice Daniel
1883–84	Robert John Dickson Burnie
1884–85	William Williams
1885–86	William John Rees
1886–87	Frank Ash Yeo
1887–88	Lawrence Tulloch
1888–89	James Jones
1889–90	Thomas Freeman
1890–91	Sir John Dillwyn-Llewelyn
1891–92	Albert Mason
1892–93	Henry Alfred Chapman
1893–94	Lt. Col. William Pike
1894–95	William Henry Edwards
1895–96	Frederick Bradford
1896–97	Howel Watkins
1897–98	J. Aeron Thomas
1898–99	Richard Martin
1899–1900	William Watkins
1900–01	William Watkins
1901–02	Griffith Thomas
1902–03	Griffith Thomas
1903–04	Griffith Thomas
1904–05	William Henry Spring
1905–06	Gwilym Morgan
1906–07	David Harris
1907–08	John Henry Lee
1908–09	Morgan Tutton
1909–10	David Matthews
1910–11	David Matthews
1911–12	Edwin George Protheroe
1912–13	David Williams
1913–14	Thomas Taliesyn Corker
1914–15	Daniel Jones
1915–16	Thomas Merrells
1916–17	David Davies
1917–18	Benjamin Jones
1918–19	William Henry Miles
1919–20	Alexander Sinclair
1920–21	Percy Molyneux
1921–22	William Owen
1922–23	David John Davies
1923–24	George Henry Colwill
1924–25	John Lewis
1925–26	David Griffiths
1926–27	David John Bassett
1927–28	Thomas William Howells
1928–29	Thomas John Richards
1929–30	Thomas Arthur Lovell
1930–31	John Miller
1931–32	John Barclay Owen
1932–33	Daniel Evans
1933–34	Edward Harris
1934–35	William James Davies
1935–36	Albert Richard Ball
1936–37	Richary Henry
1937–38	William Daniel Rees
1938–39	David Richards
1939–40	John Richard Martin
1940–41	Thomas James
1941–42	Thomas William Allison
1942–43	Thomas William Hughes
1943–44	William Harries (died 10 Aug 1944)
1944–45	Howell John Thomas (Sept–Nov)
1944–45	Thomas William Watkins
1945–46	William Dewitt
1946–47	Harry Davies
1947–48	Sir William Albert Jenkins
1949–50	Richard Gronow
1950–51	William George Rees
1951–52	Daniel Jones
1952–53	William Thomas Mainwaring Hughes
1953–54	David John Fisher
1954–55	Thomas Samuel Harris
1955–56	Percy Morris
1956–57	George Henry Libby
1957–58	Alfred Ernest Harries
1958–59	William Evans
1959–60	William George
1960–61	Sidney Cuthbert Jenkins
1961–62	Andrew Morgan
1962–63	Rosanna Cross
1963–64	Frederick Shail
1964–65	Aubrey Willis Pile
1965–66	Francis Charles Jones
1966–67	Thomas Richard Davies
1967–68	David Thomas Jeffreys
1968–69	David Arthur Jenkins
1969–70	David Franklyn Bevan
1970–71	Arthur Leonard Reed
1971–72	Arthur John Kenneth Hare
1972–73	Christopher Thomas
1973–74	Eunice Jones
1974–75	William Henry Minney
1975–76	Herbert Tudor Morgan
1976–77	Williem Werner Sivertsen
1977–78	Patricia Lucy Jenkins
1978–79	Susan Jones
1979–80	Gwilym Webber
1980–81	Robert Alan Lloyd
1981–82	Paul Harold Valerio

== Lord mayors ==
The office of mayor was upgraded to Lord Mayor by Letters Patent on 22 March 1982.

Mayors and Lord Mayors commemorated in Swansea Guildhall

Term	Name
1982	Paul Harold Valerio
1982–83	E. Tyssul Lewis
1983–84	Charles L. Thomas
1984–85	Michael J. Murphy
1985–86	Trevor Gordon Burtonshaw
1986–87	Lilian Maud Hopkin
1987–88	Holland Alan Ayres
1988–89	Howard John Morgan
1989–90	Lorna J. Aldron
1990–91	Colin Hammacott
1991–92	Byron G. Owen
1992–93	Charles Birss
1993–94	Robert G. Davies
1994–95	Walter Dyer
1995–96	Grenville Phillips
1996–97	Desmond W.W. Thomas
1997–98	Gareth Williams
1998–99	David I.E. Jones
1999–2000	Robert J. Lloyd
2000–01	W. John Davies
2001–02	Robert Francis-Davies
2002–03	June Burtonshaw
2003–04	Lawrence Bailey
2004–05	Margaret Smith
2005–06	Mair Gibbs
2006–07	Christopher Holley
2007–08	Susan Waller
2008–09	Gareth Sullivan
2009–10	R. Alan Lloyd
2010–11	Richard Lewis
2011–12	Ioan Richard
2012–13	Dennis H. James
2013–14	June Stanton
2014–15	Ceinwen Thomas
2015–16	John Newbury
2016–17	David Hopkins
2017–18	Philip Downing
2018–19	David Phillips
2019–20	Peter Black
2020–21	Mark Child
2021–22	Mary Jones
2022–23	Mike Day
2023–24	L. Graham Thomas
2024–25	Paxton Hood-Williams
2025–26	Cheryl Philpott
2026-27	Penny Matthews

== See also ==
- City and County of Swansea Council
- District of Swansea
- Swansea County Borough Council
