= Swansea East =

Swansea East may refer to:

- Swansea East (UK Parliament constituency)
- Swansea East (Senedd constituency)
