= Castle, Swansea =

Community and electoral ward in Wales

Coordinates: 51.6195°N 3.9514°W

Castle: Welsh: Castell
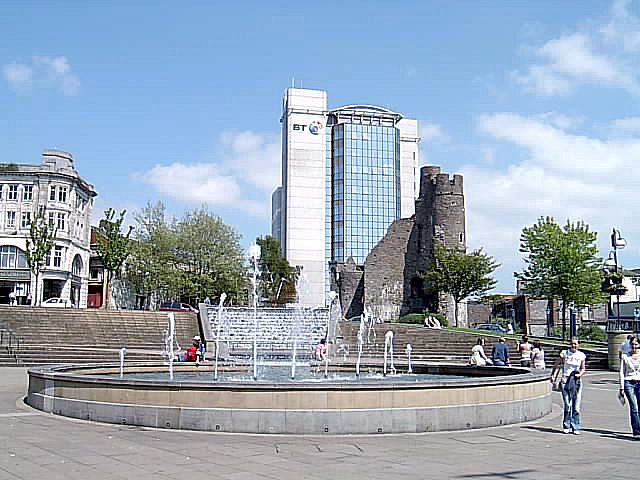
- Castle Plaza
- Population: 15,883 (2011)
- OS grid reference: SS6593
- Community: Castle
- Principal area: Swansea
- Preserved county: West Glamorgan
- Country: Wales
- Sovereign state: United Kingdom
- Post town: SWANSEA
- Postcode district: SA1
- Dialling code: 01792
- Police: South Wales
- Fire: Mid and West Wales
- Ambulance: Welsh
- UK Parliament: Swansea West
- Senedd Cymru – Welsh Parliament: Swansea West
- List of places UK Wales Swansea Map of the community

Castle (Welsh: Castell) is a community and electoral ward in the City and County of Swansea, Wales. Castle covers most of the heart of the City of Swansea, with Swansea Castle at its centre.

== Description ==
The electoral ward matches the community boundaries and consists of some or all of the following areas: Swansea city centre, Brynmelin, Dyfatty, Greenhill, parts of Mount Pleasant, Sandfields and Waun Wen in the parliamentary constituency of Swansea West. The ward borders the wards of St. Thomas to the east; Landore and Cwmbwrla to the north; Townhill and Uplands; and Waterfront to the south.

For electoral purposes, Castle is divided into a number of polling districts: City Centre, Sandfields, George Street, Mount Pleasant, XE1 High Street, XE2 High Street, North Hill, Baptist Well, XH1 Brynmelin and XH2 Brynmelin. Castle returns 4 councillors to the local council.

The Castle ward is a Communities First area.

The community does not have its own community council.

=== 2021 boundary review ===
Following a local government boundary review, the Maritime Quarter area of Castle was removed to form part of a new Waterfront ward (and community), effective from the 2022 local elections. Despite being reduced in size, Castle ward continues to elect four county councillors.

== Demographics ==
The overall population in the Castle ward and community according to the 2011 UK Census was 15,883.

They had an ethnic breakdown of:

Ethnic breakdown:

Ethnic group	Count	%
White British	11,742	73.9
White Irish	105	0.7
White Other	834	5.3
Black/African/Caribbean	400	2.5
Asian	1,862	11.7
Mixed ethnicity	213	1.3
Other (e.g. Arab)	727	4.6

The number of people identifying themselves as Welsh was 7,321 (46.1%), Considerably lower than the figure for the county as a whole.

== Local election results ==
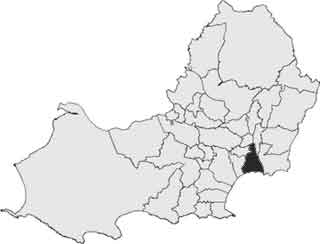
Castle ward

Since 1995 the Castle Ward has been a four-member ward for the purposes of City and County of Swansea Council elections. The ward is a major Labour Party stronghold.

=== 2017 ===
Castle 2017
Party	Candidate	Votes	%	±%
Labour	Sybil Edith Crouch*	1,820		
Labour	Erika Theresa Kirchner*	1,772		
Labour	Fiona Margaret Gordon*	1,763		
Labour	David Phillips*	1,716		
Conservative	Paul Raymond Morris	568		
Conservative	Sonya Winifred Rachel Morris	534		
Conservative	Mohammad Amin Doha	425		
Conservative	Akshit Sanjiv Khanna	411		
Plaid Cymru	Shan Couch	349		
Plaid Cymru	Damian Paul Martin	254		
UKIP	Stan Robinson	247		
Liberal Democrats	Charlene Anika	237		
Liberal Democrats	Owen John Roberts	235		
Green	David John Smith	220		
Plaid Cymru	Harri Llwyd Roberts	210		
Liberal Democrats	Thomas Davies	203		
Plaid Cymru	David Richards	191		
Liberal Democrats	Benjamin James Williams	191		
TUSC	Alec Thraves	112		
TUSC	Claire Louise Job	97		
TUSC	Colin Thomas John	89		
Turnout			29.8	+0.8
Labour hold		Swing		
Labour hold		Swing		
Labour hold		Swing		
Labour hold		Swing		

=== 2012 ===
Following the May 2012 election the ward was represented by four Labour Party councillors:

Castle 2012
Party	Candidate	Votes	%	±%
Labour	Erika Theresa Kirchner*	1,629		
Labour	Sybil Crouch	1,623		
Labour	David Phillips*	1,610		
Labour	Fiona Margaret Gordon	1,582		
Liberal Democrats	Gareth Peter Jones	533		
Liberal Democrats	Alan Jeffery	531		
Liberal Democrats	Tanya Auxiliadora May	511		
Liberal Democrats	Vicky Lewis	440		
Plaid Cymru	Patrick John Powell	274		
Plaid Cymru	Gez Couch	261		
Plaid Cymru	Harri Llwyd Roberts	254		
Green	Steve Clegg	248		
Plaid Cymru	Damian Paul Martin	248		
Conservative	Paul Raymond Morris	241		
Conservative	Stephen Joseph Gallagher	230		
Conservative	Sonya Winifred Rachel Morris	228		
Conservative	Natasha Rhian Tomaszewski	207		
Independent	Phil Crayford	207		
Green	Ross Walters	193		
TUSC	Martin John White	148		
Turnout			29.0	+0.7
Labour hold		Swing		
Labour hold		Swing		
Labour hold		Swing		
Labour hold		Swing		

Prior to the 2012 election the City and County of Swansea councillors for Castle Ward were:

- Erika Kirchner, Labour
- Alan Lloyd, Labour
- David Phillips, Labour

Councillor Barbara Hynes, who had represented Castle for 21 years, died in September 2011 resulting in a byelection.

=== 2008 ===
In the 2008 local elections, there were 21 candidates, each hoping to secure one of four seats. All four sitting Labour councillors were looking to retain their seats. However, the Conservatives, Plaid Cymru and the Liberal Democrats were all fielding four candidates each. The other candidate who was hoping to take a seat represented the Socialist Party.

=== 1999 ===
In 1999, the number of seats increased from three to four. David Phillips had previously represented the Uplands ward.

Castle 1999
Party	Candidate	Votes	%	±%
Labour	Alan Lloyd*	1,622		
Labour	Barbara Joyce Hynes*	1,579		
Labour	David Phillips	1,477		
Labour	Dereck John Roberts*	1,440		
Plaid Cymru	Yvonne Marie Davies	1,111		
Liberal Democrats	Yvonne Marjorie Holley	937		
Green	Benjamin David Grigg	632		
Conservative	Paul Raymond Morris	503		
Conservative	Sonya Winifred R. Morris	477		
United Socialists	David Richard Warren	273		
Labour hold		Swing		
Labour hold		Swing		
Labour hold		Swing		
Labour win (new seat)				

=== 1995 ===
The first election to the new unitary City and County of Swansea Council took place in 1995. All three seats were won by Labour.

Castle 1995
Party	Candidate	Votes	%	±%
Labour	Alan Lloyd	1,756		
Labour	Barbara Joyce Hynes	1,723		
Labour	Dereck John Roberts	1,623		
Liberal Democrats	Robert Speht	592		
Green	Benjamin David Grigg	515		
Liberal Democrats	Cynthia Wharrad	463		
Wales Militant Labour	Mark Evans	378		
Labour win (new seat)				
Labour win (new seat)				
Labour win (new seat)				

=== 1889 ===
Castle was one of the ten wards created to Swansea County Borough Council, electing two representatives in the November 1889 elections. The election was fought on local issues and the winning candidates had no party affiliation.

* = sitting councillor prior to the election
