= 2001 Swansea East by-election =

Swansea East by-election, 2001
- 27 September 2001

The Swansea East seat in the Welsh Assembly. Triggered by death of incumbent
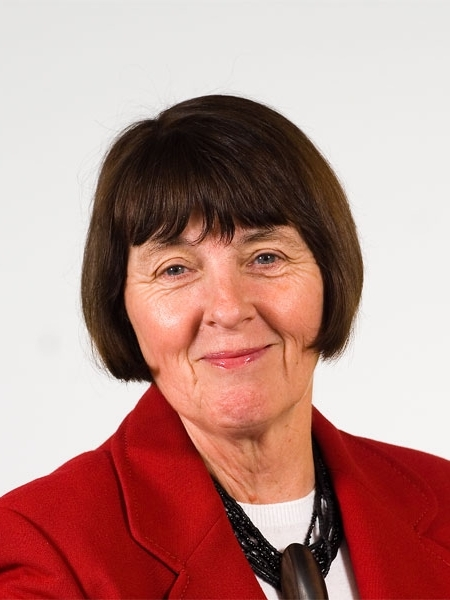
| | First party | Second party |
|---|---|---|
| | | Pla |
| Candidate | Val Lloyd | John G. Ball |
| Party | Labour | Plaid Cymru |
| Popular vote | 7,484 | 2,465 |
| Percentage | 58.1% | 19.2% |
| Swing | ▲12.5% | ▼8.2% |
| | Third party | Fourth party |
| | Lib | Con |
| Candidate | Rob Speht | Gerald Rowbottom |
| Party | Liberal Democrats | Conservative |
| Popular vote | 1,592 | 675 |
| Percentage | 12.4% | 5.2% |
| Swing | ▼6.6% | ▼2.8% |
AM before election
Val Feld
Labour
Elected AM
Val Lloyd
Labour

The 2001 Swansea East by-election is a by-election that was held for the Welsh Assembly constituency of Swansea East on Thursday 27 September 2001, following the death of its sitting Assembly Member, Val Feld.

The election was the first by-election to be held for a seat in the Welsh Assembly, taking place two years after the inaugural elections in 1999.

== Result ==
Eight candidates were nominated for the election.

The Labour Party held the seat with a greater increased majority.

Swansea East by-election, 2001
| Party | Candidate | Votes | % | ±% |
|---|---|---|---|---|
| Labour | Val Lloyd | 7,484 | 58.1 | +12.5 |
| Plaid Cymru | John G. Ball | 2,465 | 19.2 | −8.2 |
| Liberal Democrats | Rob Speht | 1,592 | 12.4 | −6.6 |
| Conservative | Gerald Rowbottom | 675 | 5.2 | −2.8 |
| UKIP | Tim C. Jenkins | 243 | 1.9 | New |
| Green | Martyn Shrewsbury | 206 | 1.6 | New |
| Socialist Alliance | Alan Thomson | 173 | 1.3 | New |
| New Millennium Bean Party | Captain Beany | 37 | 0.3 | New |
| Majority | | 5,019 | 38.9 | +20.7 |
| Turnout | | 12,875 | 22.6 | −13.5 |
| Labour hold | | Swing | +10.0 | |

== Previous result ==
Welsh Assembly Election 1999: Swansea East
| Party | Candidate | Votes | % | ±% |
|---|---|---|---|---|
| Labour | Val Feld | 9,495 | 45.6 | N/A |
| Plaid Cymru | John G. Ball | 5,714 | 27.4 | N/A |
| Liberal Democrats | Peter Black | 3,963 | 19.0 | N/A |
| Conservative | William Hughes | 1,663 | 8.0 | N/A |
| Majority | | 3,781 | 18.2 | N/A |
| Turnout | | 20,835 | 36.1 | N/A |
| Labour win (new seat) | | | | |
