= Mike Hedges (politician) =

Welsh Labour politician and Senedd Minister for Swansea East

Mike Hedges MS
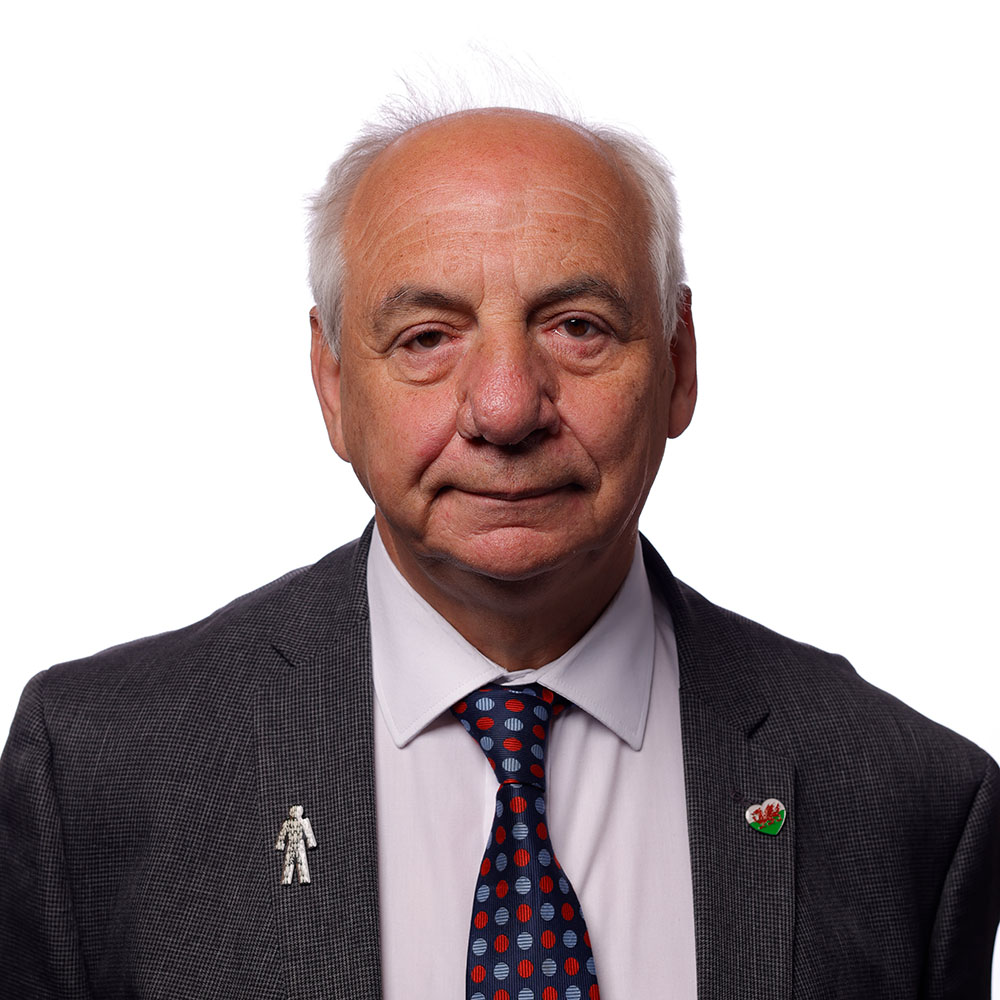
- Hedges in 2026

Member of the Senedd
- Incumbent
- Assumed office 5 May 2011
- Preceded by: Val Lloyd
- Constituency: Gwyr Abertawe (2026-)
- Majority: 9,700 (45.0%)
- Constituency: Swansea East (2011-2026)

Leader of City and County of Swansea Council
- In office 1999–2001
- Preceded by: Tom Jones
- Succeeded by: Lawrence Bailey

Member of City and County of Swansea Council for Morriston
- In office 1989–2012

Personal details
- Born: 8 July 1956 (age 70) Swansea, Wales
- Party: Welsh Labour and Co-operative (since 2021)
- Spouse: Anne Hedges 1956-2026
- Education: Swansea University Cardiff University
- Occupation: Lecturer
- Profession: Politician

Michael John Hedges (born 8 July 1956) is a Welsh Labour and Co-operative politician, who has been the Member of the Senedd (MS) since 2011, first for the constituency of Swansea East, and then Gŵyr Abertawe since 2026.

== Personal life ==
Hedges has lived in Morriston for many years but was born in the Plasmarl area of Swansea. He is married to Anne and has a daughter.

He attended Plasmarl, Parklands and Penlan Schools, and went on to higher education at Swansea University and Cardiff University.

Active in local sport, Hedges has been a football referee and coach, and was secretary of Morriston town for several years. Hedges is president of Ynystawe Cricket and Football Club and is a social member of both Morriston RFC and Glais RFC.

== Professional background ==
Originally a research scientist for British Steel Corporation at Port Talbot, Hedges has spent the last 27 years as a senior lecturer in Pontypridd, specialising in computing and information technology.

== Political history ==
Hedges was elected to represent Morriston on the City and County of Swansea Council in 1995. He was re-elected in 1999, 2004 and 2008. He was previously a member of West Glamorgan County Council from 1989. He held a number of senior posts on the Council, including Council Leader and Cabinet Member for Finance & Technical Services. He was also Vice-Chair of the Council's Scrutiny Committee and the Welsh Local Government Association spokesperson on both social services and information.

Hedges has been a governor of Swansea University, Swansea Institute, Mynyddbach and Morriston Comprehensives and Swansea College. He is chair of the governors of Glyncollen Primary School and Ynystawe Primary School.

Hedges was a non-executive director of Swansea NHS Trust between 1999 and 2005. His political interests include education, health, local government, sports provision and social deprivation.

He is a member of the Fabian Society's executive committee.

== Parliamentary career ==
Hedges was first elected as an Assembly Member for Swansea East in May 2011 and re-elected in 2016 and 2021. He has sat as a Labour Co-operative member since re-election in 2021. In February 2022, Hedges was one of three Labour MSs to support introducing rent controls in Wales.

== Committee membership and cross party group membership ==
Hedges currently sits as a member on the Senedd's Finance Committee, Public Accounts Committee and Health and Social Care Committee. He is also Chair of the Cross Party Group (CPG) on Rented Housing and Leasehold Properties and the CPG on Older People & Ageing as well as a member of the CPGs on Autism, Beer & The Pub, Co-operatives & Mutuals, Cancer, Deaf Issues and PCS Union and protection of Rabbits.

Senedd
Preceded by Val Lloyd	Member of the Senedd for Swansea East; 2011 – 2026	Succeeded by Constituency abolished
Preceded by Constituency created	Member of the Senedd for Gŵyr Abertawe; 2026 – present	Incumbent
