= Val Lloyd =

British politician (1943–2026)

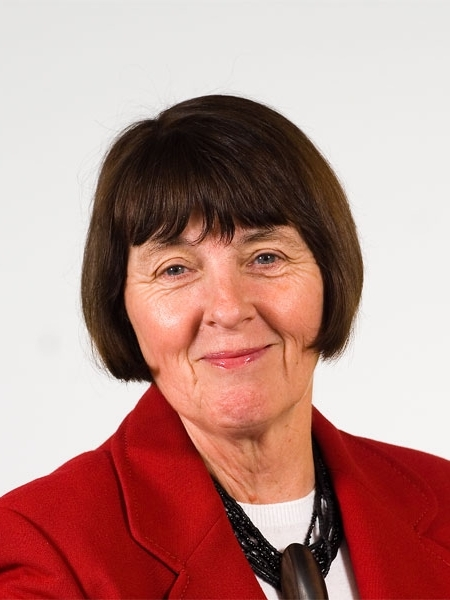
- Official portrait, 2007

Member of the Welsh Assembly for Swansea East
- In office 27 September 2001 – 5 May 2011
- Preceded by: Val Feld
- Succeeded by: Mike Hedges

Personal details
- Born: 16 November 1943 Swansea, Wales
- Died: 21 May 2026 (aged 82) London, England
- Party: Labour
- Education: Swansea University

Valerie Lloyd (16 November 1943 – 21 May 2026) was a Welsh Labour politician. She represented the constituency of Swansea East at the National Assembly for Wales from 2001 to 2011.

== Early life and education ==
Born in the Townhill area of Swansea, Glamorgan, Lloyd was educated at Swansea High School for Girls and at the Swansea University.

== Professional career ==
Lloyd had a career as a nurse working in the primary and secondary health care sectors in Swansea, London and Zambia, and then later as a teacher, which took her to places such as Bahrain. Before joining the National Assembly for Wales, Lloyd worked as a senior lecturer in nursing at the School of Health Science in Swansea University.

== Political career ==
Lloyd sought selection as the candidate for Swansea East in the new National Assembly for Wales, in a close selection battle with Val Feld. Lloyd was elected to City and County of Swansea Council in May 1999, representing Morriston ward. Her husband, Bob Lloyd, was Lord Mayor from 1999-2000, marking the first time that the Lord Mayor and Lady Mayoress had both been sitting councillors.

After Val Feld died in July 2001, Lloyd was selected as the Labour candidate in the first National Assembly for Wales by-election, the 2001 Swansea East by-election. She was elected with 58% of the vote. Prior to the election, she promised to resign as Morriston Councillor if elected to the Assembly. However, she did not do so, stating that she had intended to resign after completing a project within the council. In early May 2002, she stated she would resign by mid-May 2002. Lloyd resigned as councillor in March 2003, in the run up to the 2003 National Assembly for Wales election. In May 2003, the by-election prompted by her resignation was held, and won by the Labour candidate. Lloyd herself was re-elected as the Assembly Member for Swansea East, with a majority of 3,997 votes.

In the National Assembly, Lloyd chaired the Assembly Member Labour Party Group and Legislation Two Committee. She was also a member of the Legislation One Committee and a member of the Health, Wellbeing and Local Government Committee. Lloyd chaired the All Party Group on Waterways and the All Party Group on Nursing.

In 2009 she decided that at the next election she would have served for ten years and she decided to not be a candidate.

== Death ==
Lloyd died after a long illness at her home in London, on 21 May 2026, aged 82.

Senedd
Preceded by Val Feld	Assembly Member for Swansea East; 2001–2011	Succeeded by Mike Hedges
