= 1890 Swansea County Borough Council election =

Local election in Wales

The annual election to Swansea County Borough Council took place in November 1890. It was followed by the 1891 election. Only three of the wards were contested.

== Ward results ==
=== Alexandra ===
Alexandra 1890
Party	Candidate	Votes	%	±%
	Thomas Price	Unopposed		

=== Brynmelin ===
Brynmelin 1890
Party	Candidate	Votes	%	±%
	David Davies	Unopposed		

=== Castle ===
Castle 1890
Party	Candidate	Votes	%	±%
	William Bondfield Westlake*	340		
	Joseph Stockdale Dawe	113		

=== East ===
East 1890
Party	Candidate	Votes	%	±%
	George Nancarrow	687		
	David Thomas*	579		

=== Ffynone ===
Ffynone 1890
Party	Candidate	Votes	%	±%
	John Aeron Thomas	Unopposed		

=== Landore ===
Landore 1890
Party	Candidate	Votes	%	±%
	Rees Jones	753		
	William Williams*	517		

=== Morriston ===
Morriston 1890
Party	Candidate	Votes	%	±%
	John Hopkin John	Unopposed		

=== St Helen's ===
St Helen's 1890
Party	Candidate	Votes	%	±%
	John Adams Rawlings	Unopposed		

=== St John's (three seats) ===
St John's 1890
Party	Candidate	Votes	%	±%
	John Bourne	Unopposed		

=== Victoria (one seat) ===
Victoria 1890
Party	Candidate	Votes	%	±%
	David Jones	Unopposed		
