= Mansion House, Swansea =

Historic building in Swansea, Wales

The Mansion House
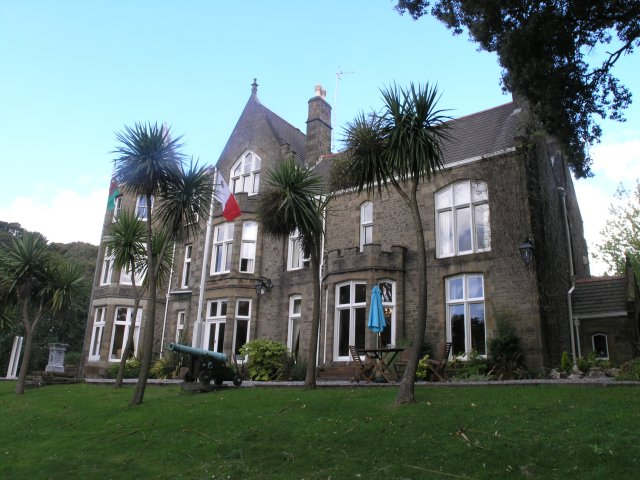
- The building in 2010

- Shown in Swansea
- 51.6216°N 3.9598°W
- Location: Ffynone Road, Swansea

History
- Built: 1863

Site notes
- Architectural style: Gothic Revival style

The Mansion House is a historic building in Ffynone Road in Swansea, Wales. The building was commissioned as a private residence but, since 1922, it has accommodated the official residence of the Lord Mayor of Swansea.

== History ==
The house was commissioned by a local builder, Evan Mathew Richards, as a private residence for himself and his family. The site he selected was in the Ffynone area of Swansea. The house was designed in the Gothic Revival style, built in rubble masonry and was completed in 1863.

The design involved an asymmetrical main frontage of six bays facing south towards Ffynone Road. The first bay was formed by an octagonal tower, which was fenestrated by bi-partite windows, and surmounted by a spire. The third bay was fenestrated by bay windows on the ground floor and first floor, these were castellated and surmounted by a gable containing a pointed window. The fourth bay was fenestrated by a castellated bay window on the ground floor and by a lancet window on the first floor, while the other bays were fenestrated by segmental headed bi-partite or tri-partite windows. The house was originally known as "Brooklands".

Richards went on to be the Mayor of Swansea in 1855/56 and again 1862/63. He also served as member of parliament for Cardiganshire from 1868 to 1874. Following Richards' death in 1880, the house was acquired by James Jones who let the building out as the judges' lodgings. The property was subsequently inherited by his niece who continued to let it out to visiting judges.

The house was purchased by the County Borough of Swansea in 1922 and since then has been known as the Mansion House. The house was subsequently fitted out with furniture and paintings from the Vivian Collection which had been left to the corporation in 1905. Two cannons, which had been cast at the Royal Arsenal at Woolwich in 1804 and operated by the Sea Fencibles in defence of Swansea Harbour during the Napoleonic Wars, were placed on the terrace in front of the building.
