= Pennard (electoral ward) =

Electoral ward in Wales

Coordinates: 51.57217°N 4.09370°W

Pennard Ward
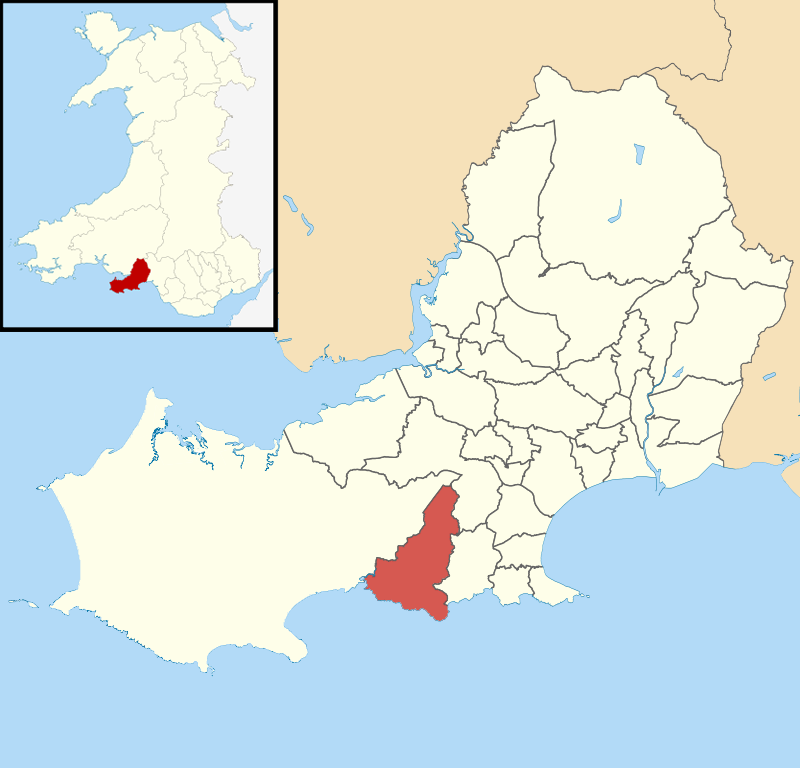
- Location of Pennard ward within the City and County of Swansea
- Area: 11.64 km^{2} (4.49 sq mi)
- Population: 2,688 (2011 census)
  - Density: 231/km^{2} (600/sq mi)
- Principal area: Swansea
- Preserved county: West Glamorgan
- Country: Wales
- Sovereign state: United Kingdom
- UK Parliament: Gower
- Senedd Cymru – Welsh Parliament: Gŵyr Abertawe
- Councillors: Lynda James (Independent)

Pennard is an electoral ward in the City and County of Swansea, Wales, United Kingdom. It is coterminous with the community of Pennard.

The electoral ward consists of some or all of the following places: Bishopston, Fairwood Common, Kittle, Parkmill, Pennard and Southgate in the parliamentary constituency of Gower. Part of Three Cliffs Bay falls within the ward.

Pennard is bounded by the wards of Gower to the west; Fairwood to the north and Bishopston to the east. The Bristol Channel borders Pennard to the south.

Pennard also elects a community council. For electoral purposes to Pennard Community Council, Pennard is divided into the polling wards of Southgate and Kittle.

Pennard ward returns one councillor to the City and County of Swansea council. Since May 2012 it has been represented by Lynda James (Independent).

In the 2012 local council elections, the voter turnout was 52.31%. The results were:

Candidate	Party	Votes	Status
Lynda James	Independent	442	Independents gain from Tories
Peter Lanfear	Independent	215	
Patrick Morgan	Conservative	211	
Terry Scales	Labour	131	
Arthur Rogers	Plaid Cymru	116	
Andrew Thomas	Liberal Democrats	35	

Councillor James successfully defended her seat at the May 2017 elections.
