= Mal Pope =

Welsh musician (born 1960)

- Born: Maldwyn Pope; 18 May 1960 (age 66); Brynhyfryd, Swansea, Wales
- Occupations: Musician, composer
- Years active: 1974–present

Maldwyn "Mal" Pope (born 18 May 1960) is a Welsh musician and composer, who is notable for his contribution to music theatre portraying Welsh national identities and themes. He lives in the village of Mumbles, Swansea. He is known for singing both the Welsh and English language versions of the Fireman Sam theme.

== Early life and career ==
Pope was born in Brynhyfryd, Swansea, Wales, into a family of teachers. He began learning to play the guitar aged seven and was soon writing songs.

In the early 1970s Pope sent a tape of songs to BBC Radio 1 presenter John Peel, who invited Pope to perform at the BBC. The session resulted in a recording contract with Elton John's record label named The Rocket Record Company. Whilst studying at Christ's College, Cambridge, he spent much of his holidays recording in London. After leaving Cambridge, Pope moved to London and signed to Harvey Goldsmith's management company AMP.

In 1982 Pope started working for BBC Radio Wales in Cardiff as a researcher. He signed a record deal with Larry Page, wrote songs for Cliff Richard and The Hollies, duetted with Bonnie Tyler and Aled Jones, and toured with Art Garfunkel and Belinda Carlisle.

== Radio and television ==
Pope presented the weekday early breakfast show on BBC Radio Wales, but the show was cancelled amid cuts by the station in 2019. Pope returned to hosting a daily show on the station in July 2020, presenting the late-night slot, from 22:00-01:00, following the death of Chris Needs. Eleri Siôn took over the slot from 11 January 2021.

Pope hosted The Mal Pope Show, a late-night music chat show for HTV, in the 1990s, with the show winning a Welsh BAFTA award in 1995. He went on to host a late-night talk show on HTV called Heaven's Sound, which won an award at the New York Film and Television Awards in 2001.

Pope sang the theme songs of the children's television shows Fireman Sam (1987), Satellite City (1988) and Joshua Jones (1991).

== Choral and music-theatre career ==
Pope was the President of the Welsh male voice choir Gwalia Singers between 2005 and 2010.

His 2005 musical Amazing Grace, based on the 1904–1905 Welsh Revival, and directed by Michael Bogdanov, received acclaim in performances at the Swansea Grand Theatre, the Cardiff International Festival of Musical Theatre, at the Sherman Theatre, and at Theatr Clwyd in Mold. In 2006 it was performed to standing ovations at the Wales Millennium Centre, the first original Welsh musical to be presented there.

In 2007 Pope wrote another musical Contender, about the career of heavyweight boxing champion Tommy Farr. In a highlight scene set during 1937, the title character sings the Welsh national anthem "Hen Wlad Fy Nhadau" before his third-round knockout of the Nazi German opponent Walter Neusel, for whom "Deutschland über alles" has been played. Contender was premièred at the United Nations building in New York, followed by seasons at Swansea's Grand Theatre and the Aberystwyth Arts Centre.

Pope has sung on religious albums composed by the musician, Phil Baggaley, including City of Gold in 1997. Pope has also been involved in other albums and concerts including Shipwrecks and Islands, Road to the City, Strands of Gold and, most recently, The Time Project.
