= Gwalia Singers =

The Gwalia Singers (Swansea) is a Welsh male voice choir based in Swansea, Wales.

== History ==
The choir was formed in 1966 by Bryan Myles. They competed in their first serious competition in 1978 - the Welsh Brewers' Choral Competition, held in Carmarthen. The following year they won in the category for fewer than 40 voices at the Miners' Eisteddfod in Porthcawl. 1981 saw the choir record a single with the Cory Band on Stiff Records. It was a cover version of Jona Lewie's "Stop the Cavalry". Although it failed to chart, it was regularly played by DJs in the United States and has been suggested as "probably the most popular song ever by an artist who never had a charted recording".

Musical director, Bryan Myles, left the choir in 1996 and was replaced by Simon Oram.

The choir were invited to perform at the christening of Alvin Stardust's daughter, Millie Margaret May, in May 2001.

To celebrate their 40th anniversary, two special concerts were held during 2006. The first, in the Swansea Grand Theatre, featured guest performances from Mal Pope, Miss Daisy Blue, the Vivace Singers and The Storys. The second concert was held in the city's Brangwyn Hall. Later in the year, due to a move out of the area, MD Simon Oram passed the baton on to Deputy MD Nick Rogers.

2007 saw the choir performing in Mannheim, Germany, to mark the city's 400 years of history. This coincided with the 50th anniversary of its twinning with Swansea. The Deputy Lord Mayor of Swansea, Ioan Richard, presented Mannheim Oberburgermeister Gerhard Widder with a dragon memento cut from Welsh slate. 2007 also saw the choir increasing its size to 44 members.

The choir was chosen to participate in the 2008 St. David's Celebration held at the Disneyland Resort Paris. They provided four performances for the resort visitors on 1 and 2 March. The choir has returned for the celebration in subsequent years and performed for the fourth time in as many years in March 2011.

The choir's President from 2005 to 2010 was singer/songwriter Mal Pope. He was succeeded in 2011 by former Wales international rugby union rugby player Geoff Wheel.

Alvin Stardust's funeral took place at St Thomas Church in Swansea on 5 December 2014 at which the Gwalia Singers sang Calon Lân, a Welsh hymn which was a particular favourite of his.

A performance of "Stop the Cavalry" was recorded by Fresh One Productions and a clip was included in the documentary Rewind the Christmas Hits which was broadcast on Channel 4 on 20 December 2014.
