= Richard Martin (mayor of Swansea) =

Welsh industrialist and mayor

Sir Richard Martin (1843–1922) was a Welsh industrialist and public man. He was Mayor of Swansea 1898–99 and was influential in developing education facilities in Swansea.

== Early life and career ==
Richard Martin was born in Pentre-mawr, Swansea, August 1843. He attended Copper Works School in Hafod before beginning work in the Millbrook iron works, Swansea. He became a clerk in the civil service in 1867 and transferred from Swansea to Grimsby in 1872. However, he returned to Swansea three years later to start a business; he co-founded the Vale of Swansea zinc works in 1879 at Llansamlet. He remained connected to the zinc works, which still operate today, until his death. He started up the Birch Grove iron works in 1881 and bought the Ynys-pen-llwch tin works in 1884.

== Political Career and Swansea University ==
Martin served the town council 1884–1910 as member and alderman, becoming mayor 1898–99. He was also chairman of the education committee for six years. In this time, he strived to have the University College of South Wales situated in Swansea, however Cardiff was ultimately chosen as its site. He nevertheless succeeded in ensuring the establishment of a technical school, which later became the technical college, in Swansea.

Martin then strove to ensure the college's recognition as one of the constituent colleges of the University of Wales, alongside Sir Isambard Owen, to no avail. However, Martin pushed for a university college in Swansea, urging its necessity upon the Haldane Commission on Welsh university education (1916–18), with the result that it was founded in 1920, developing in later years into Swansea University. King George V laid the foundation stone, and knighted Richard Martin at this time.

Martin continued to work on improving the town, building the Normal College on the Glanmor Estate in addition. However, his work was cut short by his sudden death in London on 11 September 1922. He is buried at Ystum Llwynarth.
