= Swansea Civic Centre =

County building in Swansea, Wales

- Canolfan Ddinesig Abertawe
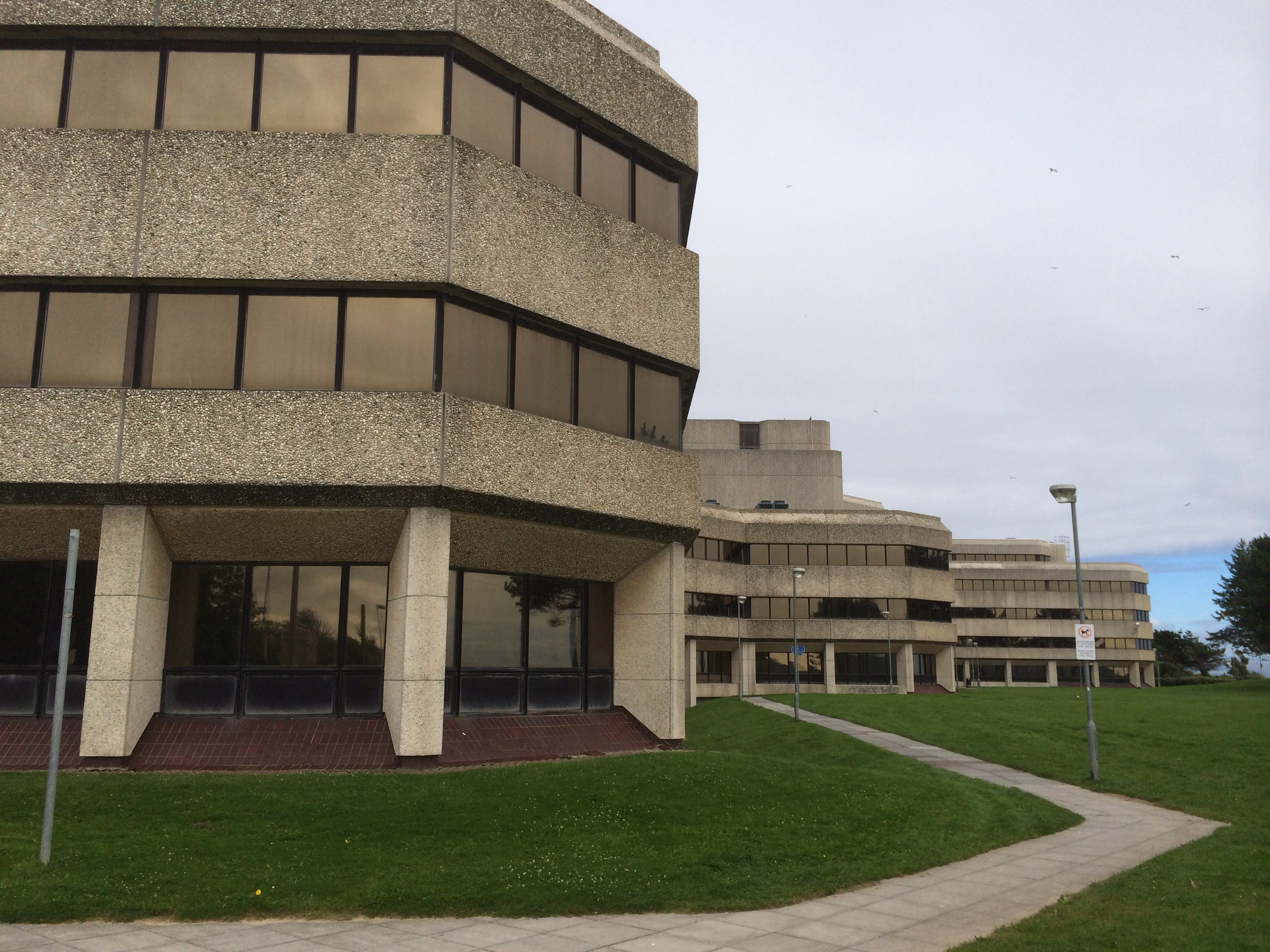
- Swansea Civic Centre

- Location within Swansea
- Former names: County Hall

General information
- Architectural style: Brutalist style
- Location: Swansea, Wales, Oystermouth Road, Swansea
- Coordinates: 51°36′49.00″N 3°56′54.00″W
- Inaugurated: 1982

Design and construction
- Architect: C. W. Quick

Swansea Civic Centre (Welsh: Canolfan Ddinesig Abertawe) – formerly known as County Hall – is the principal administrative centre of Swansea Council. Standing some 800 m southwest of Swansea city centre, by the seafront and overlooking Swansea Bay, the complex houses – in addition to the council chamber and offices – a public cafe, the central library, an exhibition space, archives service, and contact centre.

== History ==
Following the implementation of the Local Government Act 1972, which broke up Glamorgan County Council and established West Glamorgan County Council, the new county council initially met at Swansea Guildhall. Finding that this arrangement, which involved sharing facilities with Swansea Council, to be inadequate, county leaders procured a dedicated building, selecting a site formerly occupied by an old railway goods yard associated with the Mumbles Railway.

The new building was designed by C. W. Quick of the West Glamorgan County Architects Department in the Brutalist style, built by French Kier (phase 1) and A. Monk (phase 2) and opened as County Hall in July 1982. The design featured continuous bands of glazing with deep washed calcined flint panels above and below. Queen Elizabeth II, accompanied by the Duke of Edinburgh, visited on 20 April 1989.

After local government re-organisation in 1996, which abolished West Glamorgan County Council, ownership of the building was transferred to Swansea Council. It was renamed Swansea Civic Centre on 19 March 2008, and Swansea Central Library moved into the complex as part of a redevelopment scheme. The library made nearly 566,000 book loans during the year ended 31 March 2009, making it the busiest library in Wales and the tenth busiest library in the UK.

In January 2016, Swansea Council announced plans to redevelop the area, the second phase of which would involve demolition of Swansea Civic Centre and the creation of city beach which would also include an aquarium and digital science centre.

In May 2021 the Twentieth Century Society placed the site on its Top 10 Buildings at Risk List.

== See also ==
- Guildhall, Swansea
