= Kittle, Swansea =

Coordinates: 51.5839°N 4.0603°W

Kittle
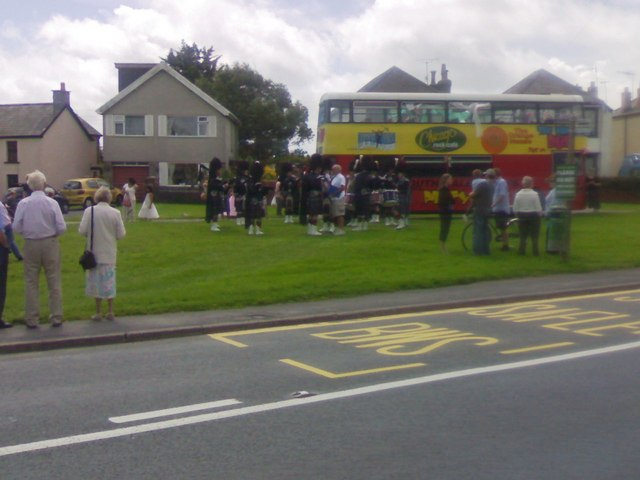
- Kittle village green

- Location within Swansea
- Principal area: Swansea
- Preserved county: West Glamorgan
- Country: Wales
- Sovereign state: United Kingdom
- UK Parliament: Gower
- Senedd Cymru – Welsh Parliament: Gower

Kittle is a village in the City and County of Swansea, Wales. The village is located on the B4436 road between Pennard and Bishopston, It is part of the Pennard community, which is in the south east of the Gower peninsula.

There is a village green facing a row of shops in the centre of the village. Kittle also has a pub, The Beaufort Arms.

== Governance ==
Kittle is the name of a community ward which elects three community councillors to Pennard Community Council.

It is also in the Pennard ward for elections to the City and County of Swansea Council.
