= Southgate, Swansea =

Coordinates: 51.5697°N 4.0908°W

Southgate
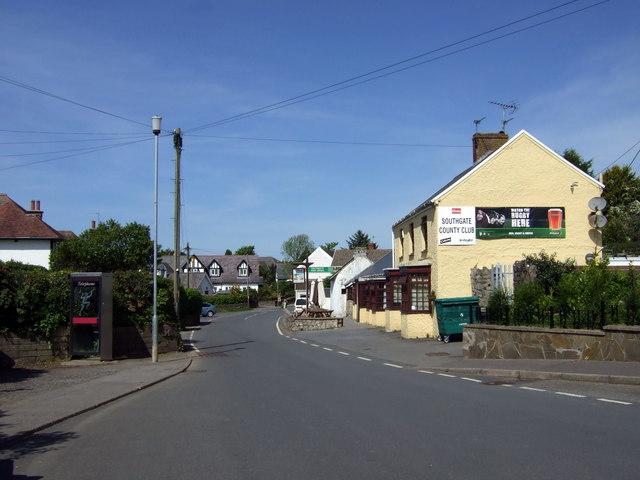
- Southgate County Club (2009), Southgate Road

- Location within Swansea
- Population: 2,004 (2011 census)
- Community: Pennard
- Principal area: Swansea
- Country: Wales
- Sovereign state: United Kingdom

Southgate Post Office, Southgate Road

Southgate is a village in the community of Pennard on the Gower Peninsula, Swansea, Wales. It is also a community electoral ward for Pennard Community Council. The population in 2011 was 2,004, making up most of the population of the community.

== Description ==
The village is located between Pennard Golf Course and the cliffs of the Gower coast. The village comprises largely of modern twentieth and twenty-first century housing, but includes a variety of shops, a post office, a social club (The Southgate) and Pennard Golf Club at the northern end.

Southgate has some of the most expensive housing in the area, with average house prices in the village of £366,000 in 2018. In July 2017 a bungalow sold for £735,000 and another for £660,000, two of the three most expensive properties sold in the county in that month.

Henbury Cottage, a two-storey stone house adjoining the Southgate Club, dates from the mid 18th-century and has a Grade II heritage listing.

== Governance ==
The village is in the electoral ward of Pennard for elections to City and County of Swansea Council.

Southgate is also the largest community ward for Pennard Community Council, electing up to eleven of the fifteen community councillors.
