= 1891 Swansea County Borough Council election =

Local election in Wales

The annual election to Swansea County Borough Council took place in November 1891. It was followed by the 1892 election.

== Ward results ==
=== Alexandra ===
Alexandra 1891
| Party | Candidate | Votes | % | ±% |
|---|---|---|---|---|
| | Thomas Price | Unopposed | | |

=== Brynmelin ===
Brynmelin 1891
| Party | Candidate | Votes | % | ±% |
|---|---|---|---|---|
| | David Davies | Unopposed | | |

=== Castle ===
Castle 1891
| Party | Candidate | Votes | % | ±% |
|---|---|---|---|---|
| | William Bondfield Westlake* | 340 | | |
| | Joseph Stockdale Dawe | 113 | | |

=== East ===
East 1891
| Party | Candidate | Votes | % | ±% |
|---|---|---|---|---|
| | George Nancarrow | 687 | | |
| | David Thomas* | 579 | | |

=== Ffynone ===
Ffynone 1891
| Party | Candidate | Votes | % | ±% |
|---|---|---|---|---|
| | Viner Leeder | Unopposed | | |

=== Landore ===
Landore 1891
| Party | Candidate | Votes | % | ±% |
|---|---|---|---|---|
| | William Jones | Unopposed | | |

=== Morriston ===
Morriston 1891
| Party | Candidate | Votes | % | ±% |
|---|---|---|---|---|
| | William Henry Edwards | Unopposed | | |

=== St Helen's ===
St Helen's 1891
| Party | Candidate | Votes | % | ±% |
|---|---|---|---|---|
| | John Adams Rawlings | Unopposed | | |

=== St John's (three seats) ===
St John's 1891
| Party | Candidate | Votes | % | ±% |
|---|---|---|---|---|
| | James Howell | Unopposed | | |

=== Victoria (one seat) ===
Victoria 1891
| Party | Candidate | Votes | % | ±% |
|---|---|---|---|---|
| | W.H. Spring | Unopposed | | |
