= Pennard =

Village and community in Swansea, Wales

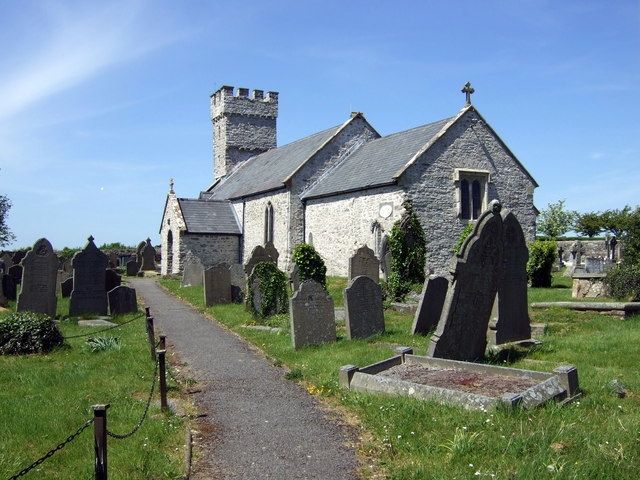
- St Mary's Church

- Location within Swansea
- Population: 2,688
- Community: Pennard
- Principal area: Swansea
- Preserved county: West Glamorgan
- Country: Wales
- Sovereign state: United Kingdom
- Post town: Swansea
- Postcode district: SA3
- Police: South Wales
- Fire: Mid and West Wales
- Ambulance: Welsh
- UK Parliament: Gower
- Senedd Cymru – Welsh Parliament: Gower
- List of places UK Wales Swansea 51.579°N 4.071°W Map of the community

Pennard is a village and community on the south of the Gower Peninsula, about 7 miles south-west of Swansea city centre. It falls within the Pennard electoral ward of Swansea. The Pennard community includes the larger settlements of Southgate and Kittle. the population as of 2011 was 2,688.

== Description and amenities ==
The village has a church, health centre, library and a primary school. There is also an 18-hole golf course, as well as the remains of a 12th-century castle.

The name "Pennard" is of Welsh origin and first appears in a 12th century Latin document, while Llanarthbodu may have been the historical name for the place before the arrival of the Normans.

=== Pennard Castle ===
Pennard Castle and Golf Course

To the west of Pennard village, overlooking the valley of Pennard Pill, is the 12th-century ruins of Pennard Castle. The castle was abandoned in the 14th-century due to encroachment from the sand dunes. It was described as "desolate and ruinous" by 1650 and today only the gatehouse and some of the curtain wall remain.

=== Pennard Golf Club ===
Pennard Golf Club is an 18-hole golf course known as the "links in the sky" due to its lofty views over the coast and Pennard Sand Dunes. Described variously as "intimidating" and only second in beauty to the Langland Bay Golf Club, the club invited golf architect Tom Doak to rebuild and redesign its bunkers in 2015.

=== St Mary's Church ===
The parish church of St Mary's, post dates an earlier medieval church of the same name which was located near Pennard Castle. The older church was abandoned in the 1500s and only the foundations remain. The newer church was restored in 1847 and a porch added. Inside the church there is a Jacobean pulpit and font cover, as well as some 18th-century wall tablets. The church became Grade II listed in 1964.

The poets Vernon Watkins (1906–1967), Harri Webb (1920–1994) and Nigel Jenkins (1949–2014) are buried in the churchyard. Watkins also has a memorial plaque inside the church.

St Mary's is open all year during daylight hours, with services every Sunday.

== Local politics ==
Pennard lies in the Gower UK Parliament constituency and Senedd constituency. The Pennard ward elects a councillor to the City and County of Swansea Council.

The Pennard community (civil parish) includes the nearby villages of Southgate, Kittle, Sandylane, Cannisland and Langrove. It elects a Community council of fourteen members. The council is divided into two ward areas, Southgate and Kittle, who return eleven and three councillors respectively. It made the Swansea news in 2013 when the chairman resigned after other councillors expressed concerns about the running of the council.

The community of Pennard is twinned with Passage West in the Republic of Ireland.
