= Swansea Indoor Bowls Stadium =

Indoor bowls stadium

Coordinates: 51.653°N 3.924°W

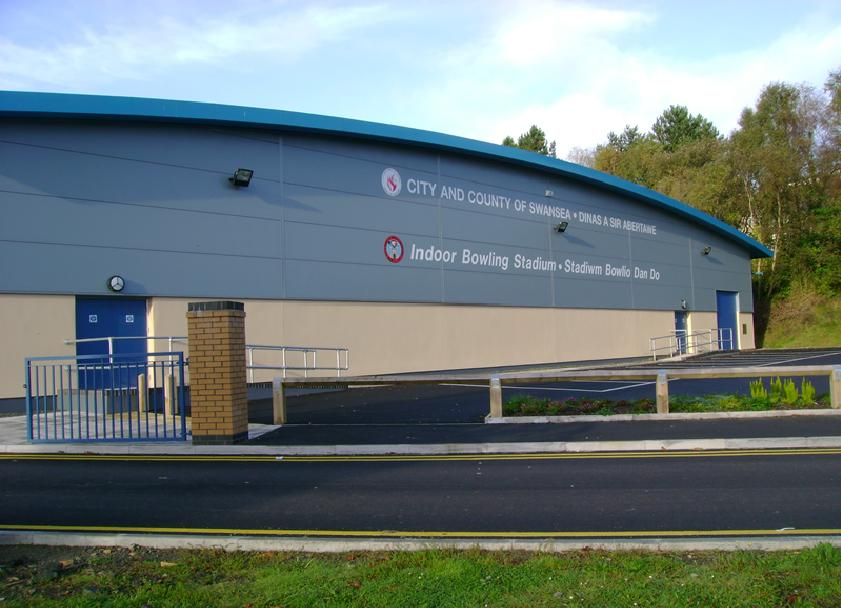
Swansea Indoor Bowls Stadium

The Swansea Indoor Bowls Stadium is an indoor bowls stadium based in Plasmarl, Swansea, Wales. It was opened in early 2008 and was constructed at a cost of £1.5m replacing the indoor bowling facilities that had been offered at Swansea Leisure Centre. The stadium has six lanes and is capable of holding international events.

Swansea Bowls Stadium is home to the Swansea Indoor Bowling Club. The stadium hosted the World Indoor Singles and Mixed Pairs Championship from 16 April to 20 April 2008. It will host the Gravelles Welsh International Open Bowls Championships 2009, part of the World Bowls Tour 2008/2009, from 31 January to 6 February 2009.
