= Val Feld =

Welsh Labour Party politician

Valerie Feld AM
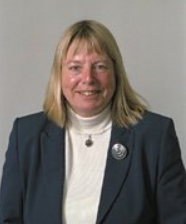

Member of the Welsh Assembly for Swansea East
- In office 6 May 1999 – 17 July 2001
- Preceded by: New Assembly
- Succeeded by: Val Lloyd

Personal details
- Born: 29 October 1947 Bangor
- Died: 17 July 2001 (aged 53)
- Party: Labour
- Spouse: John Feld

Valerie Anne Feld (née Valerie Breen Turner; 29 October 1947 – 17 July 2001), was a Welsh Labour Party politician.

== Background ==
Born in Bangor, Caernarvonshire, she was educated at the Abbey School in Malvern and in 1969 married John Feld, with whom she had two children. She worked as a journalist in London and later as a social worker and housing advisor in Lancashire. In 1981, following the break-up of her marriage, she took a job in her native Wales – founding and becoming the first Director of Shelter Cymru. In her spare time she studied for an MA at Cardiff University in Women's Studies, and in 1989 was appointed head of the Equal Opportunities Commission for Wales. She held the post for ten years, until her election as Assembly Member for Swansea East.

== Political career ==
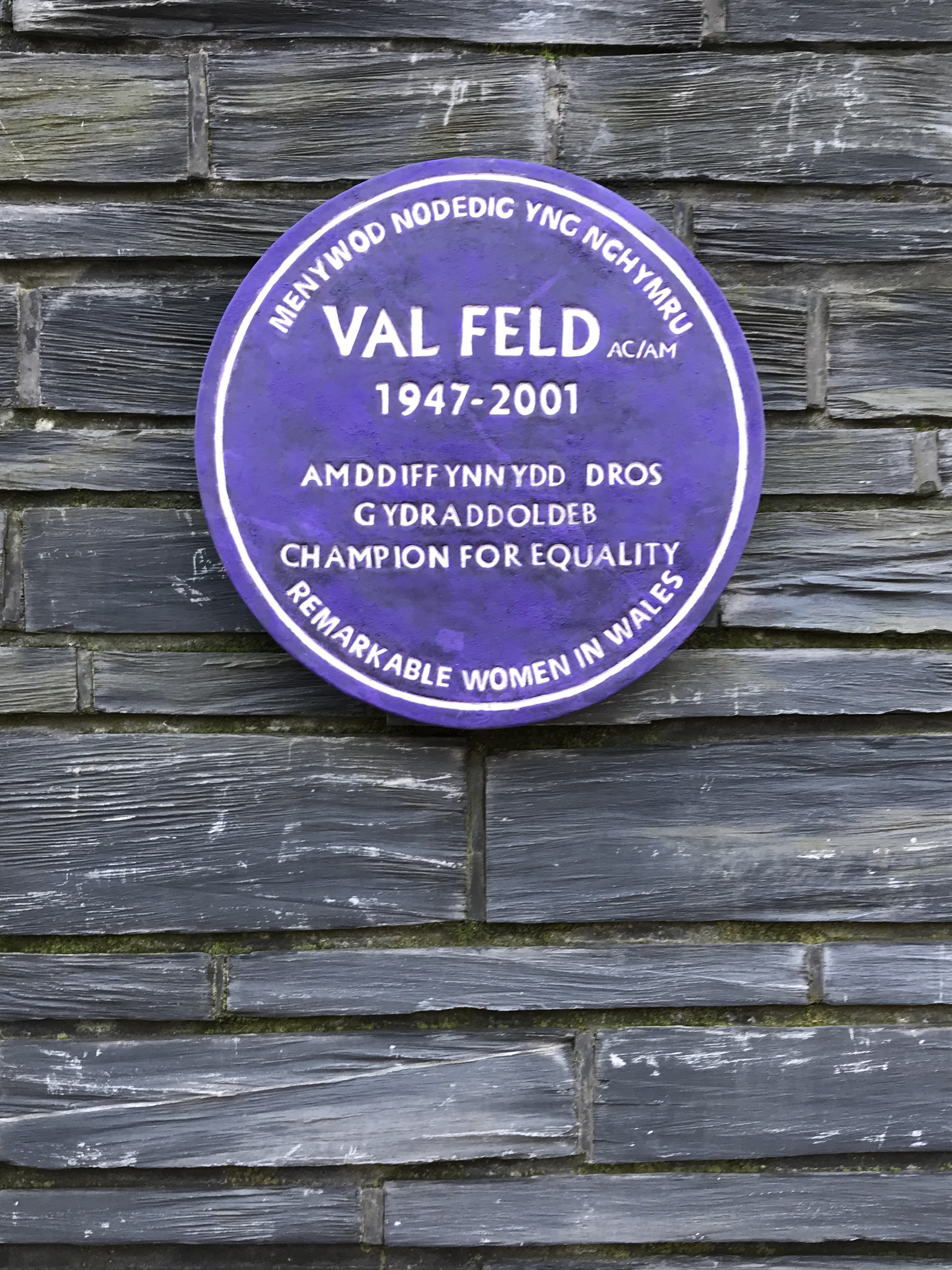
Val Feld plaque at The Senedd

Feld had been a Local Labour councillor in Chorley, Lancashire. She was a leader in the campaign for Welsh devolution and was Treasurer of the Yes for Wales campaign leading up to the 1997 referendum. Her oversight ensured that the enabling legislation for devolution, Government of Wales Act 1998, included clauses requiring equal opportunities. She was subsequently elected as a Member of the National Assembly for Wales for Swansea East, and served in that position from 1999 to July 2001.

Feld died on 17 July 2001 after suffering from cancer, becoming the first member of the National Assembly for Wales to die in office and thus cause a by-election. She was a highly regarded politician with a history of social activism and commitment to equality and social justice, and was Chair of the Assembly's Economic Development Committee until May 2001. First Minister Rhodri Morgan said of her, "I believe I speak for the whole of Wales when I say that the death of Val Feld is a grievous blow for us all".

== Legacy ==
In 2017 the Purple Plaques campaign was started to commemorate remarkable women in Wales, aiming to install purple plaques on buildings in Wales to recognise significant women. The first purple plaque was placed on the Senedd building to commemorate her. Feld is included among the 100+ Welsh women selected by the Women's Equality Network Wales to have made a significant contribution to national life.

Senedd
Preceded by (new post)	Assembly Member for Swansea East; 1999–2001	Succeeded by Val Lloyd
