= District of Swansea =

Former district of West Glamorgan, Wales

Coordinates: 51.630°N 3.946°W

Swansea Welsh: Abertawe
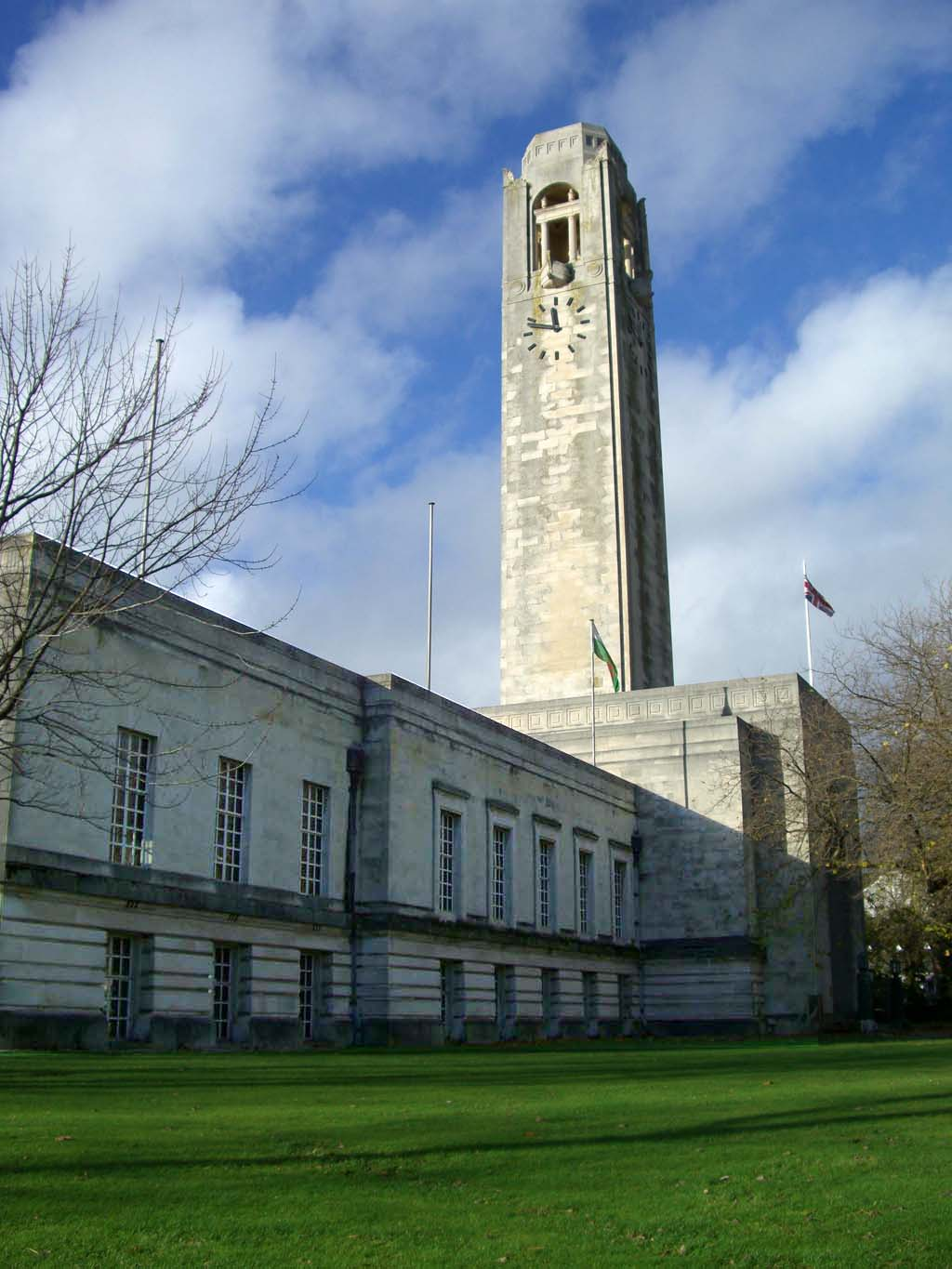
- Guildhall, Swansea

- Population
  - 1974: 191,400
  - 1994: 188,800
- History
  - Created: 1 April 1974
  - Abolished: 31 March 1996
  - Succeeded by: Swansea
- Status: City
  - HQ: Swansea
- Contained within
  - County Council: West Glamorgan

The District of Swansea (Welsh: Abertawe) was a local government district with city status in West Glamorgan, Wales from 1974 to 1996.

== History ==
When elected county councils were established in 1889 under the Local Government Act 1888, Swansea was considered large enough to provide its own county-level services, and so it became a county borough, independent from Glamorgan County Council. Under the Local Government Act 1972 a uniform two-tier system of counties and districts was introduced across Wales and England. The new Swansea district was created on 1 April 1974 and covered the area of the former county borough of Swansea and the Gower Rural District, from the administrative county of Glamorgan. The new district inherited the city status of the former county borough and so was styled as the "City of Swansea", and was governed by Swansea City Council. It was one of four districts within the new county of West Glamorgan. On 22 March 1982 the city was granted letters patent raising the mayor to the dignity of Lord Mayor.

The district was abolished in 1996, when West Glamorgan County Council was abolished and the districts in the county reorganised to become principal areas. The district of Swansea merged with most of the Lliw Valley district to form the larger City and County of Swansea.

== Political control ==
The first election to the council was held in 1973, initially operating as a shadow authority alongside the outgoing authorities until it came into its powers on 1 April 1974. From 1974 until the council's abolition in 1996, political control of the council was as follows:

| Party in control | Years |
|---|---|
| Labour | 1974–1976 |
| Independent | 1976–1979 |
| Labour | 1979–1996 |

The last leader of the council was Trevor Burtonshaw.

== Premises ==
The council was based at Swansea Guildhall, which had been completed in 1934 for the former county borough council. Between 1974 and 1982 it shared the building with West Glamorgan County Council, until the county council built its own premises at County Hall.
