= Waterfront, Swansea =

Community in Swansea, Wales

Waterfront
- Community
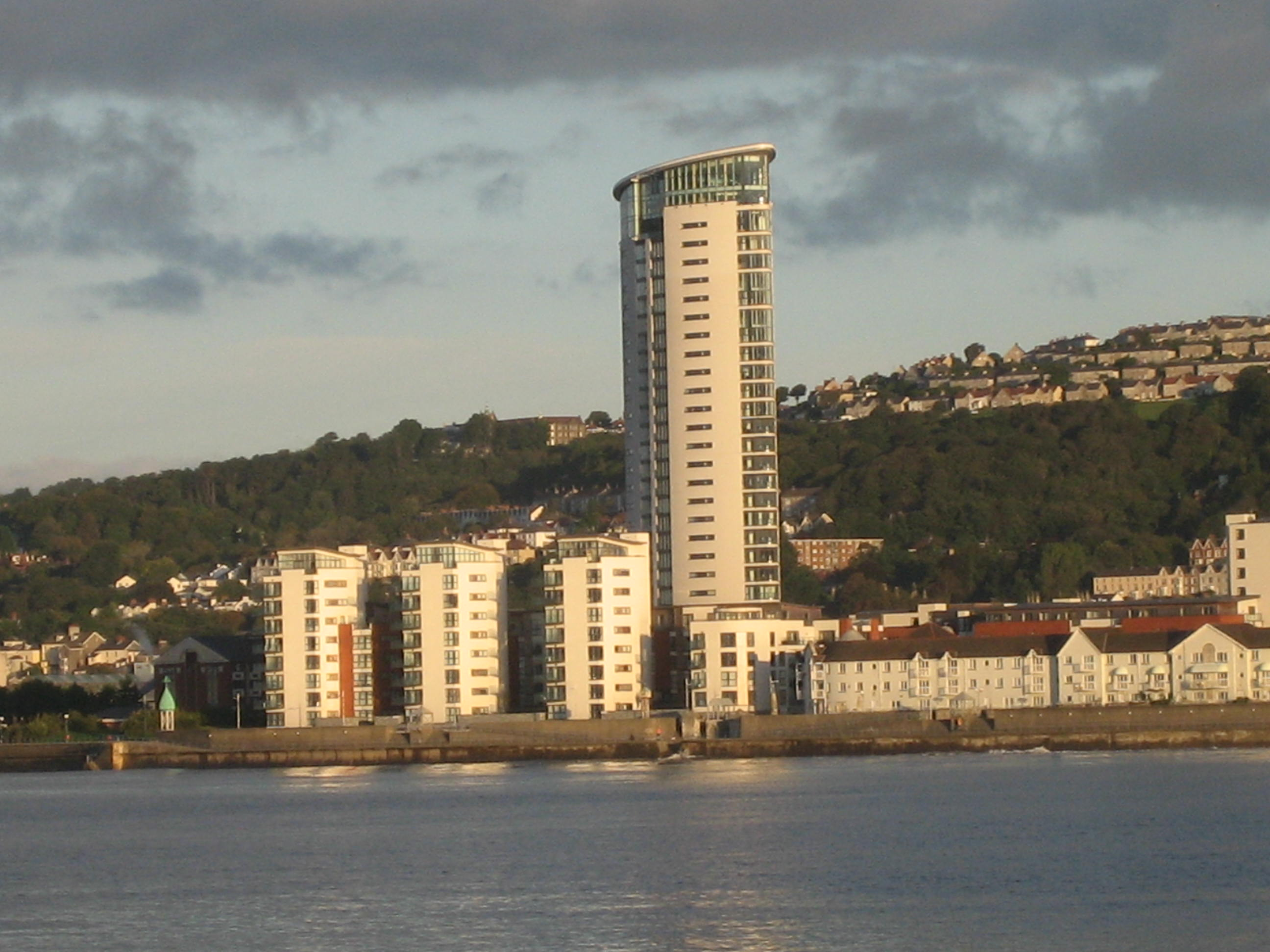
- The Tower and modern apartments in Waterfront
- Principal area: Swansea
- Country: Wales
- Sovereign state: United Kingdom
- Police: South Wales
- Fire: Mid and West Wales
- Ambulance: Welsh
- List of places UK Wales Swansea Map of the community

Waterfront is a community and electoral ward in Swansea, Wales.

The community includes the Maritime Quarter of Swansea, as well as the new development of SA1 around Swansea Docks. It is bordered to the north by the communities of Castle and St Thomas and to the south by the beaches of Swansea Bay.

The Waterfront community was created as a result of The City and County of Swansea (Electoral Arrangements) Order 2021, effective from 5 May 2022.

As well as Swansea's marinas and docks, Waterfront is also the location for Swansea Museum, the National Waterfront Museum, the Dylan Thomas Centre and one of Wales' tallest buildings at 107 metres, The Tower at Meridian Quay.

== Governance ==
A new electoral ward called Waterfront was created, effective from the 2022 Welsh local elections, following a local government boundary review. The ward was formed using parts of the neighbouring Castle and St Thomas wards. The Waterfront ward elects one councillor to Swansea Council.

At the 2022 Swansea Council elections, Liberal Democrat Sam Bennett was elected as county councillor, with 60% of the vote.
