= Plasmarl =

Suburb of Swansea, Wales

Coordinates: 51°39′01.00″N 3°55′54.00″W

Plasmarl, or Plas-Marl, is a suburban district and historically a village of the City and County of Swansea, Wales. It falls within the old Copper Quarter of Landore electoral ward.

== Location ==
Plasmarl is centered on the A4067 road, which connects Swansea with the M4 motorway. The A4067, called Ffordd Cwm Tawe in the area, is a bypass to the older Neath Road (B4603), running parallel to it. The area to the west of Neath Road is mostly residential. The eastern side of Neath Road is lined with a number of major car dealerships. The area further east of the A4067, along Beaufort Road consists of an estate of light industry, warehousing and commercial units.

== Buildings ==
Grade II listed buildings in Plasmarl include:

- St. Paul's Parish Church on Cwm Level Road
- Dinas Noddfa Baptist Chapel on Dinas Street
- Ebenezer Baptist Church & Hall on Ebenezer Street

== Education ==
Plasmarl has a local primary school, Plasmarl Primary School, located on Britannia Road. The school, built in 1879, was originally a separate school for boys, girls, and infants, however is now mixed. In the 2019 rankings by the Welsh government the school was placed in the highest bracket, green. The school currently has just under 200 pupils.

== Sport in Plasmarl ==
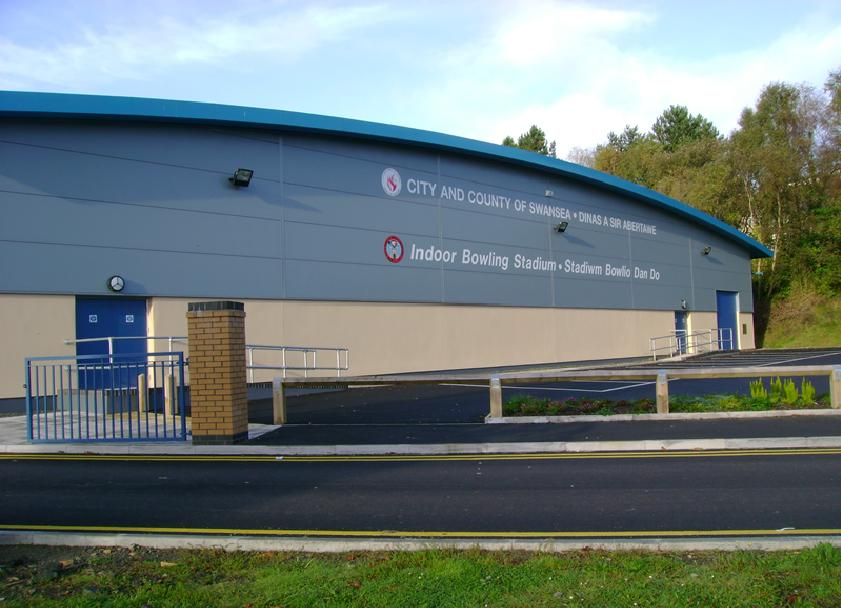
Swansea Indoor Bowls Stadium

Plasmarl is also home to Swansea Indoor Bowls. Plasmarl is close to the Swansea.com Stadium, which is the home ground to EFL Championship club Swansea City A.F.C.

== Cwm Level Park ==
Cwm Level Park is a near-by park between Plasmarl and neighbouring areas Brynhyfryd and Landore.

The park is the official ground for the association football clubs Cwmfelin Press and Cwm Albion. The park also has a playground where young children can play.

Several benches are also located around the park, providing a view of the park and the on-looking road. The park is also less than half a mile in distance from the major sports ground, the Swansea.com Stadium.

== Llewelyn Park ==
Llewelyn Park lies just north of Plasmarl, on land donated by John Dillwyn Llewelyn to the city along with money to develop the park in 1874.

== Racing ==
The A4067 (parallel to Neath Road) is frequently used for illegal street racing. The cars and motorcycles meet at the nearby football field to organise events. Motorbike races are more common in the area and generally take place throughout the day, whereas cars commonly race at night with reduced traffic. The spot is popular due to it being central in a stretch of three dual carriageways which allows for easy escape in the case of a police chase. A fatal crash took place in June 2008.
