= 1889 Swansea County Borough Council election =

1889 Welsh local government election

The first election to Swansea County Borough Council took place in 1889. It was followed by the 1890 election. The previous Town Council which had 24 members (18 councillors and 6 aldermen) would now have 40 members (30 councillors and 10 aldermen). An additional 16 members would therefore be elected.

Almost all candidates expressed no party affiliation, fighting the contest on local issues.

== Ward results ==
=== Alexandra (two seats) ===
Alexandra 1889
Party	Candidate	Votes	%	±%
	Abram Francis	505		
	John Griffiths	328		
	Thomas Jones	312		
	George Thomas King	56		

=== Brynmelin (one seat) ===
Brynmelin 1889
Party	Candidate	Votes	%	±%
Home Ruler	Gwilym Morgan	406		
	Charles Davies	390		
	Philips Jenkins	194		

=== Castle (two seats) ===
Castle 1889
Party	Candidate	Votes	%	±%
	Albert Mason	290		
	Frederick Bradford	273		
	Lawrence Tulloch	168		
	William Bondfield Westlake	159		

=== East (one seat) ===
East 1889
Party	Candidate	Votes	%	±%
	Stephen Lloyd Francis	680		
	Roger Thomas	480		

=== Ffynone (two seats) ===
Ffynone 1889
Party	Candidate	Votes	%	±%
	Morgan Tutton	470		
	John Viner Leeder	436		
	Thomas T. Pascoe	417		
	Richard White Beor	19		

=== Landore (two seats) ===
Landore 1889
Party	Candidate	Votes	%	±%
	James Naysmith	489		
	William Williams	425		
	James Howell	404		
	Benjamin Roberts	275		

=== Morriston (two seats) ===
Morriston 1889
Party	Candidate	Votes	%	±%
	David Harris	526		
	Edward Thomas	449		
	Edward Rice Morgan	430		
	Morgan Hussey	172		

=== St Helen's (two seats) ===
St Helen's 1889
Party	Candidate	Votes	%	±%
	William Pike	567		
	James Matthew Mayne	407		
	Richard White Beor	131		

=== St John's (three seats) ===
St John's 1889
Party	Candidate	Votes	%	±%
	Herbert Monger	648		
	Edward Rice Daniel	557		
	James Howell	484		
	John Griffiths	420		

=== Victoria (one seat) ===
Victoria 1889
Party	Candidate	Votes	%	±%
	William Usher	309		
Conservative	T.P. Martin	248		
Gladstonian Lib	Stephen Prust Willis	239		

== Election of Aldermen ==
Seven aldermen were elected at the annual meeting of the Council held on 9 November. An attempt was made to ensure that aldermen from particular wards were elected but this was ruled out of order. The following aldermen were elected for a term of six years.

- Mason 27
- Martin 26
- Monger 23
- Chapman 23
- Richards 23
- Pike 19
- Rocke 18
