= Hafod, Swansea =

District of Swansea, Wales

Coordinates: 51.633°N 3.939°W

Hafod
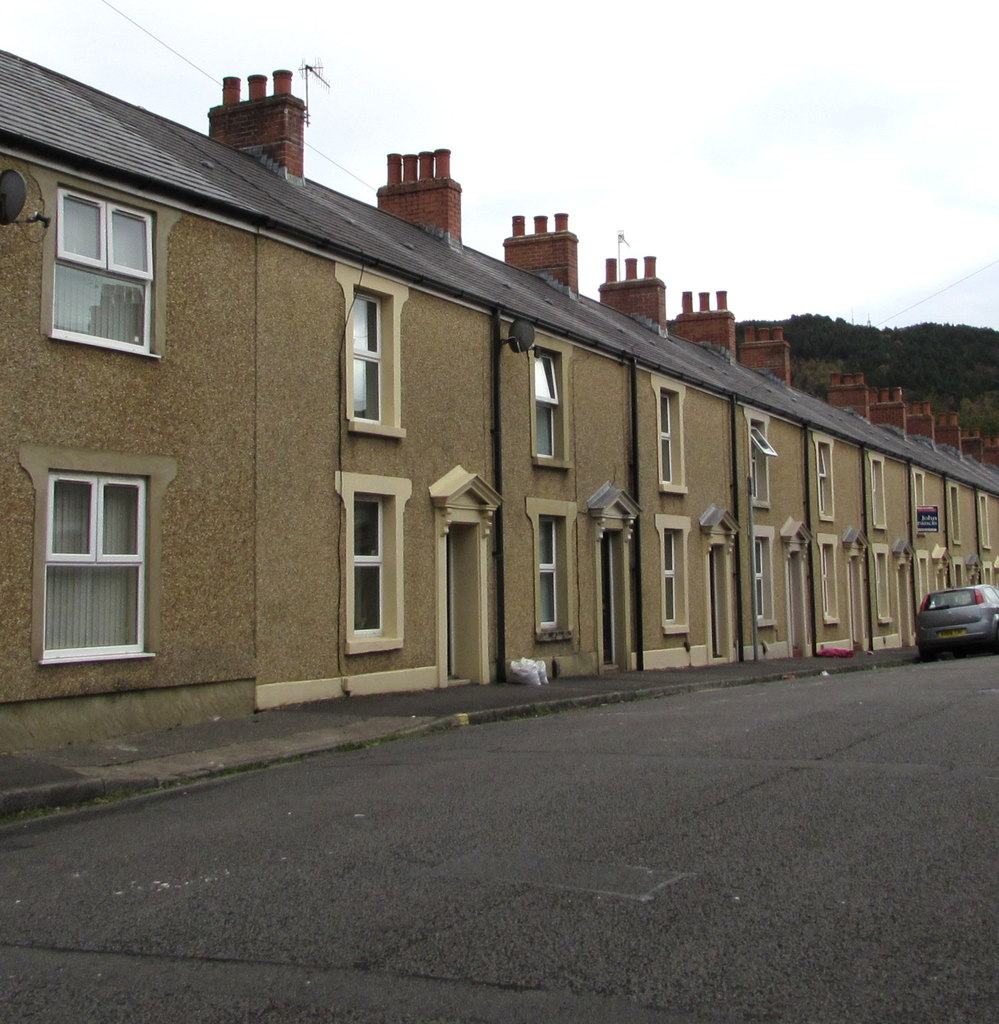
- Jersey Street houses, Hafod, Swansea

- Location within Swansea
- OS grid reference: SS660949
- Principal area: Swansea
- Preserved county: West Glamorgan
- Country: Wales
- Sovereign state: United Kingdom
- Post town: SWANSEA
- Postcode district: SA1
- Dialling code: 01792
- Police: South Wales
- Fire: Mid and West Wales
- Ambulance: Welsh
- UK Parliament: Swansea East
- Senedd Cymru – Welsh Parliament: Swansea East

Hafod is a district of the city of Swansea, Wales, and lies just north of the city centre, within the Landore ward. Hafod is the home to the Hafod Copperworks, founded in 1810 and closed in 1980, which is now being developed into an industrial heritage site.

== Name origins ==
The word hafod is a Welsh word originally referring to the seasonal cycle of transhumance: the movement of livestock and people from a lowland winter pasture at the main residence (Welsh hendre) to a higher summer pasture from roughly May to October.

== Description ==
The western part of Hafod is a residential suburb. In the late 20th century, this was a mostly run-down area of Swansea, with property prices there being some of the lowest in the city centre area. In the new millennium, many properties in the main Neath Road (B4603) and some of the side streets have benefited from council grants to improve the façade of the properties. Beside the River Tawe to the east is a small industrial strip around Morfa Road.

Hafod has a comprehensive school called Pentrehafod School, and a primary school called Hafod Primary School. There used to be junior and senior schools located on the same site, but the school was ravaged by fire during the early 1990s. The new primary school was built to replace it, and new buildings were constructed within the grounds of Pentrehafod school to cater for the junior and senior pupils. The community sports facility is the Pentrehafod sports hall and pool, located in the grounds of the Pentrehafod Comprehensive School. The school is built on what was formerly the waste product dumping ground for the Morris family copper works.

Neath Road is a busy thoroughfare used by buses and cars between central Swansea and the northern suburbs in and around Morriston and Llansamlet. There is a dedicated express bus route to the east of Neath Road, which is used by buses serving the Landore Park and Ride site and the 'bendy bus' service from Singleton Hospital to Morriston Hospital.

== Plans ==
=== Hafod Bypass ===
A bypass has been proposed for the community of Hafod for many years. Neath Road, which runs through Hafod, is a main entry point into the city of Swansea, and yet is a narrow road with terraced housing lining both sides of the street. Plans ratified by the City & County of Swansea in 2006 allow for the redevelopment of the western bank of the River Tawe. A new road would be constructed along a railway siding to extend the current Morfa Road, so that the new road would run from New Cut Road up to the Liberty Stadium.

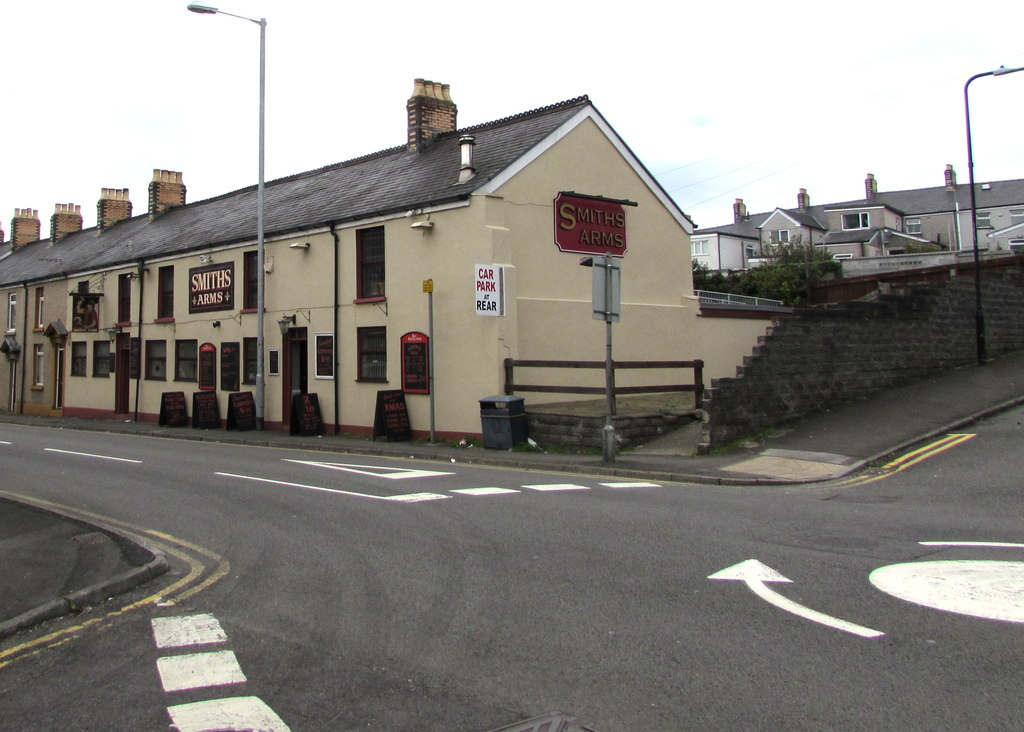
Smiths Arms in Hafod
