= Swansea Guildhall =

Municipal Building in Swansea, Wales

Guildhall
- Guildhall Abertawe
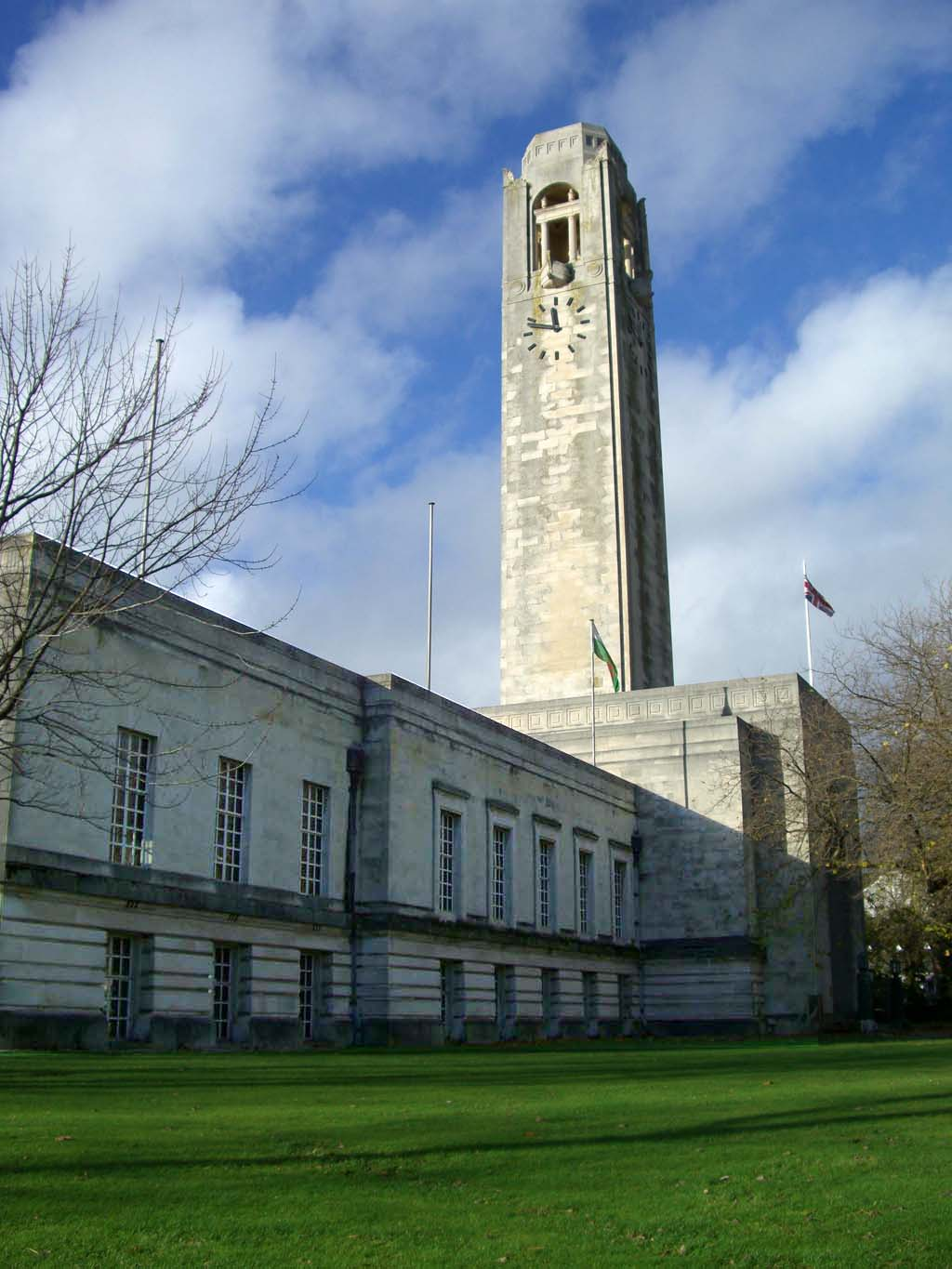
- Swansea guildhall c.2006
- Interactive map of the Guildhall area

General information
- Location: Swansea, Wales, Swansea SA1 4PE
- Coordinates: 51°36′51.00″N 3°57′37.00″W
- Construction started: 1932
- Completed: 1934
- Inaugurated: 23 October 1934
- Cost: £300,000
- Owner: City and County of Swansea Council

Height
- Height: 48 metres (clock tower)

Design and construction
- Architect: Sir Percy Thomas
- Main contractor: Messrs. E Turner & Sons Ltd

Listed Building – Grade I
- Official name: Swansea Guildhall
- Designated: 25 July 1994
- Reference no.: 14594

The Guildhall (Welsh: Guildhall Abertawe) is one of the main office buildings of the City and County of Swansea Council. The Guildhall complex, which includes the City Hall, Brangwyn Hall (concert hall) and the County Law Courts for Swansea, is a Grade I listed building.

== History ==
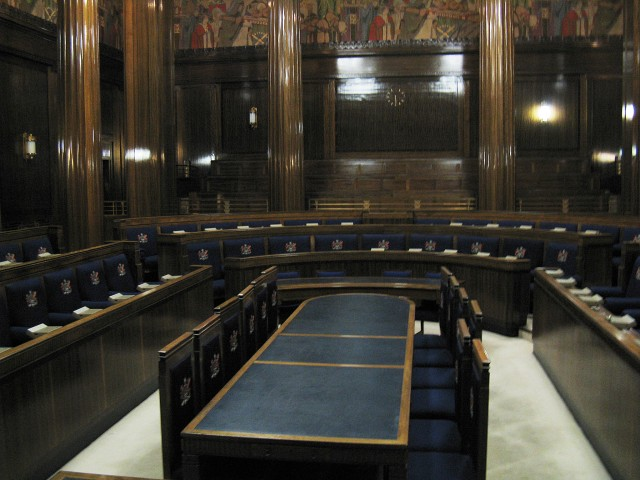
The council chamber

The building was commissioned to replace the old Swansea Guildhall. The site selected for the building had previously formed part of Victoria Park. The foundation stone for the building was laid on 4 May 1932. The building was designed by Sir Percy Thomas in the neoclassical style (but perhaps more accurately described as Stripped Classicism) and was officially opened by The Duke of Kent on 23 October 1934.

The design envisaged a building finished in white Portland stone, and included a 48 metres (157 ft) art deco clock-tower, making it a landmark. The clock-tower featured the prow of a Viking longship, jutting out on each side as a reminder of Sweyn Forkbeard, thought to be the founder of Swansea. The council chamber used panelling made of Australian walnut and columns 22 feet (6.7 m) high. Bronze busts depicting the local Members of Parliament, David Matthews, David Williams, Percy Morris and David Grenfell, were subsequently installed outside the council chamber. Percy Thomas won the Bronze Medal for Architecture from the Royal Institute of British Architects for his work in 1935.

Despite the prominence of the building from the air, the building emerged unscathed in February 1941 during the Swansea Blitz of the Second World War.

On 3 July 1969, The Prince of Wales made an announcement in person at the Guildhall that the town of Swansea would become a city.

The west wing of the building was used as the venue for the Swansea assizes. Following the implementation of the Courts Act 1971, the former assizes courthouse became the venue for hearings of the newly designated Swansea Crown Court. Crown court hearings then moved to a dedicated courthouse in St Helen's Road in 1988.

In the 1980s, the first recorded urban breeding pair of peregrine falcons was observed nesting on the Swansea Guildhall.

For most of the 20th century, the Guildhall was also the meeting place of Swansea City Council; however, it ceased to be the local seat of government when the enlarged City and County of Swansea Council was formed at Swansea Civic Centre in 1996. It continues to accommodate the city's law courts and also the council's administration offices. The Guildhall clock was last overhauled in 2019.

== See also ==
- Guild
- Guildhall
