= Brynhyfryd, Swansea =

Coordinates: 51.64301°N 3.95256°W

Brynhyfryd
- Location within Swansea
- OS grid reference: SS649956
- Principal area: Swansea
- Preserved county: West Glamorgan
- Country: Wales
- Sovereign state: United Kingdom
- Post town: SWANSEA
- Postcode district: SA5
- Dialling code: 01792
- Police: South Wales
- Fire: Mid and West Wales
- Ambulance: Welsh
- UK Parliament: Swansea East
- Senedd Cymru – Welsh Parliament: Swansea East

Brynhyfryd is a small village in Swansea, Wales mostly within the Cwmbwrla ward. In Welsh, the name translates to “lovely hill”. The area is mostly residential. Brynhyfryd approximates to the area around Llangyfelach Road where it intersects with Brynhyfryd Road.

Brynhyfryd Infant School and Brynhyfryd Junior School are the local schools in the area. Other local amenities include the Brynhyfryd public library. There are a few shops on Llangyfelach road and the area has a Grade II listed church – the Brynhyfryd Baptist Chapel.

== Notable people ==
- Mal Pope Welsh musician
