= Swansea County Borough Council =

Swansea County Borough Council was established in 1889 under the Local Government Act 1888.

The first elections were held in November 1889. The number of electoral wards had been increased, from four to ten, namely Alexandra, Brynmelin, Castle, East, Ffynone, Landore, Morriston, St Helen's, St John's and Victoria. The number of representatives were increased to 40. Representatives were to 'retire' for re-election in rotation, with ten seats to be filled at each council election.

The county was abolished under the Local Government Act 1972 on 1 April 1974. It was incorporated into the new county of West Glamorgan.

As a result of the Local Government (Wales) Act 1994, which came into force on 1 April 1996, a number of new unitary authorities were created including the new Swansea Council.

== See also ==
- 1889 Swansea County Borough Council election
