= Swansea East (Senedd constituency) =

Senedd constituency (1999–2026)

Coordinates: 51°39′01″N 3°55′10″W

Swansea East Dwyrain Abertawe
- Former Senedd borough constituency for the Senedd
- Swansea East shown as one of the 40; Senedd constituencies

Former Senedd borough constituency
- Created: 1999
- Abolished: 2026
- Party: Labour
- MS: Mike Hedges
- Electoral region: South Wales West
- Preserved county: West Glamorgan

Swansea East (Welsh: Dwyrain Abertawe) was a constituency of the Senedd. It elected one Member of the Senedd by the first past the post method of election. It was one of seven constituencies in the South Wales West electoral region, which elected four additional members, in addition to seven constituency members, to produce a degree of proportional representation for the region as a whole.

== Boundaries ==
Map of 1999–2026 boundaries

The constituency was created for the first election to the Assembly, in 1999, with the name and boundaries of the Swansea East Westminster constituency. It was entirely within the preserved county of West Glamorgan.

The other six constituencies of the region were Aberavon, Bridgend, Gower, Neath, Ogmore and Swansea West.

== Assembly members and Members of the Senedd ==
Election	Member	Party	Portrait
1999	Val Feld	Labour	
2001	Val Lloyd	Labour	
2011	Mike Hedges	Labour	

== Voting ==
In general elections for the Senedd, each voter had two votes. The first vote was used to vote for a candidate to become the Member of the Senedd for the voter's constituency, elected by the first past the post system. The second vote was used to vote for a regional closed party list of candidates. Additional member seats were allocated from the lists by the d'Hondt method, with constituency results being taken into account in the allocation.

== Election results ==
=== Elections in the 2020s ===
2021 Senedd election: Swansea East
Party	Candidate	Constituency			Regional		
Party	Candidate	Votes	%	±%	Votes	%	±%
Labour	Mike Hedges	12,950	60.1	+8.0	10,999	50.7	+8.3
Plaid Cymru	Rhiannon Barrar	3,250	15.1	+1.8	3,406	15.7	+0.8
Conservative	Cameron Brennan	2,497	13.7	+5.3	3,591	16.5	+7.4
Liberal Democrats	Sam Bennett	1,055	4.9	-2.7	877	4.0	-6.9
UKIP	Dan Morgan	567	2.6	-13.3	457	2.1	-13.6
Abolish	Cameron Edwards	484	2.2	New	738	3.4	±0.0
Reform UK	Darren Rees	295	1.4	New	224	1.0	New
Green					670	3.1	+0.8
Freedom Alliance (UK)					201	0.9	New
Independent	Caroline Jones				170	0.8	New
Propel					137	0.6	New
Gwlad					118	0.5	New
Communist					69	0.3	±0.0
TUSC					57	0.3	-0.1
Majority		9,700	45.0	+8.8			
Turnout		21,098	34.6	−1.1			
Labour hold		Swing					
Notes

Regional Ballot void votes: 139. Want of an Official Mark (0), Voting for more than ONE party or individual candidate (38), Writing or mark by which the Voter could be identified (0), Unmarked or Void for uncertainty (101)

Swansea East saw the lowest turnout at the 2021 election of any constituency in Wales.

=== Elections in the 2010s ===
Welsh Assembly Election 2016: Swansea East
Party	Candidate	Constituency			Regional		
Party	Candidate	Votes	%	±%	Votes	%	±%
Labour	Mike Hedges (Note: Incumbent member for this constituency)	10,726	52.1	-6.3	8,724	42.4	-9.6
UKIP	Clifford Johnson	3,274	15.9	New	3,236	15.7	+11.1
Plaid Cymru	Dic Jones	2,744	13.3	+0.9	3,056	14.9	+3.6
Conservative	Sadie Vidal	1,729	8.4	-6.2	1,866	9.1	-2.4
Liberal Democrats	Charlene Webster	1,574	7.6	-1.2	2,248	10.9	+2.6
Green	Tony Young	529	2.6	New	471	2.3	+0.2
Abolish					689	3.4	New
Monster Raving Loony					135	0.7	New
TUSC					76	0.4	-0.2
Communist					53	0.3	+0.1
Majority		7,452	36.2	▼7.6			
Turnout		20,576	35.7	▲4.5			
Labour hold		Swing	▼11.1				

Welsh Assembly Election 2011: Swansea East
Party	Candidate	Constituency			Regional		
Party	Candidate	Votes	%	±%	Votes	%	±%
Labour	Mike Hedges	11,035	58.4	+16.9	9,902	52.0	+14.4
Conservative	Dan Boucher	2,754	14.6	+4.8	2,196	11.5	+2.5
Plaid Cymru	Dic Jones	2,346	12.4	−3.1	2,158	11.3	-4.2
Liberal Democrats	Robert Samuel	1,673	8.8	−8.7	1,572	8.3	-8.7
BNP	Joanne Shannon	1,102	5.8	New	886	4.7	-3.4
UKIP					869	4.6	-0.3
Socialist Labour					703	3.7	+2.4
Green					398	2.1	-0.7
Welsh Christian					201	1.1	New
TUSC					114	0.6	New
Communist					45	0.2	-0.1
Majority		8,281	43.8	+19.8			
Turnout		18,910	31.2	−3.8			
Labour hold		Swing					

Regional ballots rejected: 154

=== Elections in the 2000s ===
Welsh Assembly Election 2007: Swansea East
Party	Candidate	Constituency			Regional		
Party	Candidate	Votes	%	±%	Votes	%	±%
Labour	Val Lloyd	8,590	41.5	−5.7	7,806	37.6	-5.6
Liberal Democrats	Helen Ceri Clarke	3,629	17.5	−6.8	3,528	17.0	-3.0
Plaid Cymru	Danny Bowles	3,218	15.5	+2.7	3,217	15.5	+1.2
Conservative	Bob T. Dowdle	2,025	9.8	+3.3	1,858	9.0	+1.4
Independent	Alan Robinson	1,618	7.8	New			
Independent	Ray Welsby	1,177	5.7	New			
Independent	Gary D. Evans	460	2.2	New			
BNP					1,681	8.1	New
UKIP					1,025	4.9	-2.4
Green					576	2.8	-1.2
Socialist Labour					271	1.3	New
Welsh Christian					206	1.0	New
Socialist Alternative (UK)					152	0.7	New
Keith James - Independent					133	0.6	New
Respect					106	0.5	New
Joel Jenkins - Independent					71	0.3	New
Communist					70	0.3	New
CPA					38	0.2	New
Majority		4,961	24.0	+1.1			
Turnout		20,717	35.0	+4.6			
Labour hold		Swing	+0.6				

Welsh Assembly Election 2003: Swansea East
Party	Candidate	Constituency			Regional		
Party	Candidate	Votes	%	±%	Votes	%	±%
Labour	Val Lloyd	8,221	47.2	+1.6	7,480	43.2	
Liberal Democrats	Peter Malcolm Black	4,224	24.3	+5.3	3,462	20.0	
Plaid Cymru	David R. Evans	2,223	12.8	−14.6	2,484	14.3	
UKIP	Alan Robinson	1,474	8.5	N/A	1,263	7.3	
Conservative	Peter A. Morris	1,135	6.5	−1.5	1,323	7.6	
Welsh Socialist Alliance	Alan Thomson	133	0.8	New			
Green					687	4.0	
Socialist Labour					463	2.7	
Cymru Annibynnol					145	0.8	
ProLife Alliance					25	0.1	
Majority		3,997	22.9	+4.7			
Turnout		17,410	30.4	−5.7			
Labour hold		Swing	−1.8				

2003 Electorate: 57,252
Regional ballots rejected: 364

2001 Swansea East by-election
Party	Candidate	Votes	%	±%
Labour	Val Lloyd	7,484	58.1	+12.5
Plaid Cymru	John G. Ball	2,465	19.2	−8.2
Liberal Democrats	Rob Speht	1,592	12.4	−6.6
Conservative	Gerald Rowbottom	675	5.2	−2.8
UKIP	Tim C. Jenkins	243	1.9	New
Green	Martyn Shrewsbury	206	1.6	New
Socialist Alliance	Alan Thomson	173	1.3	New
New Millennium Bean Party	Captain Beany	37	0.3	New
Majority		5,019	38.9	+20.7
Turnout		12,875	22.6	−13.5
Labour hold		Swing	−10.0	

The first by-election to the Welsh National Assembly was held on 27 September 2001 following the death of the sitting Labour Party AM, Val Feld.

=== Elections in the 1990s ===
Welsh Assembly Election 1999: Swansea East
Party	Candidate	Votes	%	±%
Labour	Val Feld	9,495	45.6	N/A
Plaid Cymru	John G. Ball	5,714	27.4	N/A
Liberal Democrats	Peter Malcolm Black	3,963	19.0	N/A
Conservative	William Hughes	1,663	8.0	N/A
Majority		3,781	18.2	N/A
Turnout		20,835	36.1	N/A
Labour win (new seat)				
