= List of schools in Swansea =

This is a list of schools in the city and county of Swansea, Wales.

== Primary schools ==
- Birchgrove Primary School
- Bishopston Primary School
- Blaenymaes Primary School
- Brynhyfryd Infant School
- Brynhyfryd Junior School
- Brynmill Primary School
- Burlais Primary School
- Cadle Primary School
- Casllwchwr Primary School
- Christchurch CW Primary School
- Cila Primary School
- Clase Primary School
- Clwyd Community Primary School
- Clydach Primary School
- Craigfelen Primary School
- Crwys Primary School
- Cwmbwrla Primary School
- Cwmglas Primary School
- Cwmrhydyceirw Primary
- Danygraig Primary School
- Dunvant Primary School
- Gendros Primary School
- Glais Primary School
- Glanrhyd Primary School
- Glyncollen Primary School
- Gors Community Primary School
- Gorseinon Primary School
- Gowerton Primary School
- Grange Primary School
- Gwyrosydd Primary School
- Hafod Primary School
- Hendrefoilan Primary School
- Knelston Primary School
- Llangyfelach Primary School
- Llanrhidian Primary School
- Manselton Primary School
- Mayals Primary School
- Morriston Primary School
- Newton Primary School
- Oakleigh House
- Oystermouth Primary School
- Parkland Primary School
- Penclawdd Primary School
- Pengelli Primary School
- Penllegaer Primary School
- Pennard Primary School
- Pentrechwyth Primary School
- Pentre'r Graig Primary School
- Pen-y-Fro Primary School
- Penyrheol Primary School
- Plasmarl Primary School
- Pontarddulais Primary School
- Pontlliw Primary School
- Pontybrenin Primary School
- Portmead Primary School
- Sea View Community Primary School
- Sketty Primary School
- St David's RC Primary School
- St Helen's Primary School
- St Illtyd's RC Primary School
- St Joseph's Primary RC School Clydach
- St Joseph's RC Cathedral Primary School
- St Thomas Community Primary School
- Talycopa Primary School
- Terrace Road Primary School
- Townhill Community Primary School
- Trallwn Primary School
- Tre Uchaf Primary School
- Waunarlwydd Primary School
- Waun Wen Primary School
- Whitestone Primary School
- Ynystawe Primary School

== Welsh medium primary schools ==
- Ysgol Gynradd Gymraeg Bryniago
- Ysgol Gynradd Gymraeg Brynymor
- Ysgol Gynradd Gymraeg Gellionnen
- Ysgol Gynradd Gymraeg Lon-las
- Ysgol Gynradd Gymraeg Llwynderw
- Ysgol Gynradd Gymraeg Pontybrenin
- Ysgol Gynradd Gymraeg Tan-y-lan
- Ysgol Gynradd Gymraeg Tirdeunaw
- Ysgol Gynradd Gymraeg Y Cwm
- Ysgol Gynradd Gymraeg Y Login Fach

== Independent primary schools ==
- Oakleigh House School

== Secondary schools ==
- Birchgrove Comprehensive School*
- Bishop Gore School
- Bishop Vaughan RC School
- Bishopston Comprehensive School*
- Cefn Hengoed Comprehensive School*
- Dylan Thomas Community School*
- Gowerton Comprehensive School
- Morriston School
- Olchfa School
- Pentrehafod School*
- Penyrheol Comprehensive School*
- Pontarddulais Comprehensive School*

* Denotes an incomplete Secondary School which does not have a Sixth Form

== Welsh medium secondary schools ==
- Ysgol Gyfun Gymraeg Bryn Tawe
- Ysgol Gyfun Gŵyr

== Independent secondary schools ==
- Ffynone House School
- OneSchool Global UK

== Special schools ==
- Ysgol Crug Glas
- Ysgol Pen-y-Bryn

== Further and higher education establishments ==
- Gower College Swansea
- Swansea University
- University of Wales Trinity Saint David

== See also ==
- Peace Mala
- Swansea Bay Sea School
