= Llwchwr =

Community in Swansea, Wales

Coordinates: 51.6632°N 4.0556°W

- Community
- Principal area: Swansea
- Country: Wales
- Sovereign state: United Kingdom
- Police: South Wales
- Fire: Mid and West Wales
- Ambulance: Welsh
- List of places UK Wales Swansea Map of the community

Llwchwr is a community and (from 2022) electoral ward in the central western part of the City and County of Swansea, Wales, UK. It lies 9 km (6 miles) west-north-west of Swansea city centre and is bounded by the communities of Gorseinon to the north, Penllergaer to the east, and Gowerton to the south, as well as by the estuary of the River Loughor to the west, on the far side of which lies Bynea in Carmarthenshire, connected to Llwchwr by road and rail bridges.

The population of Llwchwr, as recorded at the 2011 census, was 9,134.

The community is home to Garden Village FC of the Welsh Football League, Carmarthenshire League Division 2 outfit Loughor Rovers, and Loughor RFC who play in ASDA Nation League Division 1 West.

The community of Llwchwr, together with that of Gorseinon, is twinned with Ploërmel in France.

== Governance ==
The community, which has its own community council, Llwchwr Town Council, comprising the town of Loughor and the adjacent village of Kingsbridge, (The south east of the town of Gorseinon), plus Llewitha and is divided for electoral purposes into the community wards of Garden Village, Kingsbridge, Lower Loughor and Upper Loughor. From 1974 to 1996 Llwchwr formed part of the Lliw Valley district of the county of West Glamorgan. It also includes the southern suburbs of Gorseinon town and Garden Village.

Effective from the 2022 local elections Llwchwr became an electoral ward for Swansea Council, electing three county councillors.
