= 2012 City and County of Swansea Council election =

2012 Welsh local government election

Results of the 2012 City and County of Swansea Council election

The fifth election to the City and County of Swansea Council was held in May 2012. It was preceded by the 2008 election and was followed by the 2017 election.

== Overview ==
All council seats were up for election. These were the fifth elections held following local government reorganisation and the abolition of West Glamorgan County Council. The Labour Party made substantial gains and won back control of the authority, having lost their majority in 2004

== Candidates ==
The contests were fought by most of the main parties but Labour was the only one to contest all of the seats.

== Overall result ==
City and County of Swansea Council election result 2012
| Party | Seats | Gains | Losses | Net gain/loss | Seats % | Votes % | Votes | +/− |
|---|---|---|---|---|---|---|---|---|
| Labour | 49 | | | +19 | 68.1 | 45.5 | 30,173 | +19.6 |
| Liberal Democrats | 12 | | | -11 | 16.7 | 15.4 | 10,226 | -6.5 |
| Independent | 3 | | | -4 | 4.2 | 14.6 | 9,692 | +4.3 |
| Conservative | 4 | | | 0 | 5.6 | 10.9 | 7,228 | -5.8 |
| Plaid Cymru | 0 | | | -1 | 0.0 | 5.4 | 3,564 | -3.1 |
| Independents @ Swansea | 3 | | | -3 | 4.2 | 5.0 | 3,297 | -4.2 |
| Green | 0 | | | 0 | 0.0 | 2.1 | 1,404 | -1.8 |
| TUSC | 0 | | | 0 | 0.0 | 0.6 | 401 | New |
| People's Representative | 1 | | | 0 | 1.4 | 0.4 | 295 | -0.2 |
| National Front | 0 | | | 0 | 0.0 | 0.1 | 92 | New |
| BNP | - | - | - | - | - | - | - | -2.6 |
| Socialist | - | - | - | - | - | - | - | -0.2 |
| Communist | - | - | - | - | - | - | - | -0.1 |
| Left List | - | - | - | - | - | - | - | -0.1 |

== Results by ward ==
* = sitting councillor in this ward prior to election

=== Bishopston (one seat) ===
Bishopston 2012
| Party | Candidate | Votes | % | ±% |
|---|---|---|---|---|
| Independent | Keith Edmund Marsh* | 645 | | |
| Conservative | Gareth Davies | 267 | | |
| Labour | David Dorsett | 175 | | |
| Majority | | | | |
| Turnout | | | 40.1 | −9.6 |
| Independent hold | | Swing | | |

=== Bonymaen (two seats) ===
Long-serving Labour councillor Mair Gibbs was de-selected and failed to be returned as an Independent.

Bonymaen 2012
| Party | Candidate | Votes | % | ±% |
|---|---|---|---|---|
| Labour | Paul Lloyd | 959 | | |
| Labour | Mandy Evans | 893 | | |
| Independent | Mair Eluned Gibbs* | 514 | | |
| Independent | John Brian Hague* | 493 | | |
| National Front | Sion Lynford Owens | 92 | | |
| Turnout | | | 32.2 | −2,0 |
| Labour hold | | Swing | | |
| Labour gain from Independent | | Swing | | |

=== Castle (four seats) ===
Castle 2012
| Party | Candidate | Votes | % | ±% |
|---|---|---|---|---|
| Labour | Erika Theresa Kirchner* | 1,629 | | |
| Labour | Sybil Edith Crouch | 1,623 | | |
| Labour | David Phillips* | 1,610 | | |
| Labour | Fiona Margaret Gordon | 1,582 | | |
| Liberal Democrats | Gareth Peter Jones | 533 | | |
| Liberal Democrats | Alan Jeffery | 531 | | |
| Liberal Democrats | Tanya Auxiliadora May | 511 | | |
| Liberal Democrats | Vicky Lewis | 440 | | |
| Plaid Cymru | Patrick John Powell | 274 | | |
| Plaid Cymru | Geraint Couch | 261 | | |
| Plaid Cymru | Harri Llwyd Roberts | 254 | | |
| Green | Steve Clegg | 248 | | |
| Plaid Cymru | Damian Paul Martin | 248 | | |
| Conservative | Paul Raymond Morris | 241 | | |
| Conservative | Stephen Joseph Gallagher | 230 | | |
| Conservative | Sonya Winifred Rachel Morris | 228 | | |
| Conservative | Natasha Rhian Tomaszewski | 207 | | |
| Independent | Phil Crayford | 207 | | |
| Green | Ross Walters | 193 | | |
| TUSC | Martin John White | 148 | | |
| Turnout | | | 29.0 | +0.7 |
| Labour hold | | Swing | | |
| Labour hold | | Swing | | |
| Labour hold | | Swing | | |
| Labour hold | | Swing | | |

=== Clydach (two seats) ===
Roger Llewellyn Smith had been elected as a Labour councillor in 2008.

Clydach 2012
| Party | Candidate | Votes | % | ±% |
|---|---|---|---|---|
| Labour | Paulette Bradley Smith* | 1,055 | | |
| Independent | Gordon David Walker | 1,040 | | |
| Independent | Roger Llewellyn Smith* | 915 | | |
| Labour | Gillian Wakeman | 702 | | |
| Turnout | | | 36.4 | −1.7 |
| Labour hold | | Swing | | |
| Independent gain from Labour | | Swing | | |

=== Cockett (four seats) ===
Labour captured all four seats from the Liberal Democrats by a substantial margin. One of the four Lib Dems elected in 2008 stood as an Independent.

Cockett 2012
| Party | Candidate | Votes | % | ±% |
|---|---|---|---|---|
| Labour | Ann Cook | 1,949 | | |
| Labour | Andrew John Jones | 1,913 | | |
| Labour | Geraint Owens | 1,707 | | |
| Labour | Mitchell Theaker | 1,601 | | |
| Plaid Cymru | David Rhys Lloyd | 895 | | |
| Liberal Democrats | Nicola Anne Holley* | 728 | | |
| Liberal Democrats | William Keith Morgan* | 723 | | |
| Liberal Democrats | James Bernard Kelleher* | 637 | | |
| Liberal Democrats | Hazel Morgan | 580 | | |
| Plaid Cymru | Patricia Christine Sanderson | 533 | | |
| Plaid Cymru | Enid Vanessa Webb | 498 | | |
| Plaid Cymru | John Rhodri Thomas | 484 | | |
| Independent | Veronyca Anne Bates Hughes* | 248 | | |
| Conservative | Matthew David Johnson | 192 | | |
| Conservative | Liam Kelly | 166 | | |
| Conservative | Victoria Steventon | 155 | | |
| Conservative | Michael Overthrow | 154 | | |
| Turnout | | | 32.9 | −0.6 |
| Labour gain from Liberal Democrats | | Swing | | |
| Labour gain from Liberal Democrats | | Swing | | |
| Labour gain from Liberal Democrats | | Swing | | |
| Labour gain from Liberal Democrats | | Swing | | |

=== Cwmbwrla (three seats) ===
Cwmbwrla 2012
| Party | Candidate | Votes | % | ±% |
|---|---|---|---|---|
| Liberal Democrats | Peter Black* | 1,028 | | |
| Liberal Democrats | Christopher Holley* | 1,045 | | |
| Liberal Democrats | Lewis Graham Thomas* | 1,023 | | |
| Labour | Cyril Anderson | 965 | | |
| Labour | Peter David Meehan | 824 | | |
| Labour | Joy Richards | 807 | | |
| Turnout | | | 35.2 | −3.6 |
| Liberal Democrats hold | | Swing | | |
| Liberal Democrats hold | | Swing | | |
| Liberal Democrats hold | | Swing | | |

=== Dunvant (two seats) ===
Lib Dem councilor Nick Tregoning stood unsuccessfully as an Independent, leading to the loss of one seat to Labour who increased their vote significantly compared to 2008.

Dunvant 2012
| Party | Candidate | Votes | % | ±% |
|---|---|---|---|---|
| Liberal Democrats | John Newbury* | 575 | | |
| Labour | Jennifer Anne Raynor | 420 | | |
| Labour | Mick Harper | 354 | | |
| Independent | Nicholas John Tregoning* | 351 | | |
| Liberal Democrats | Graham Isted | 302 | | |
| Independent | Rowland Bevan | 231 | | |
| Independent | Lis Davies | 213 | | |
| Conservative | Jordan Slater | 100 | | |
| Conservative | Robert Thornton Dowdle | 89 | | |
| Turnout | | | 38.9 | −6.9 |
| Liberal Democrats hold | | Swing | | |
| Labour gain from Liberal Democrats | | Swing | | |

=== Fairwood (one seat) ===
Fairwood 2012
| Party | Candidate | Votes | % | ±% |
|---|---|---|---|---|
| Conservative | Paxton Richard Hood‐Williams* | 583 | | |
| Liberal Democrats | John Gunther Bushell | 317 | | |
| Labour | Mike Durke | 247 | | |
| Turnout | | | 49.7 | −2.6 |
| Conservative hold | | Swing | | |

=== Gorseinon (one seat) ===
Gorseinon 2012
| Party | Candidate | Votes | % | ±% |
|---|---|---|---|---|
| Labour | David Lewis | 538 | | |
| Plaid Cymru | Darren Jeffery Thomas | 275 | | |
| Independent | Beverley Howard | 184 | | |
| Conservative | Elizabeth Grace Thomas | 58 | | |
| Turnout | | | 32.7 | −2.6 |
| Labour hold | | Swing | | |

=== Gower (one seat) ===
Sitting member Richard Lewis switched from the Independents to the Lib Dems.

Gower 2012
| Party | Candidate | Votes | % | ±% |
|---|---|---|---|---|
| Liberal Democrats | Richard David Lewis* | 826 | | |
| Labour | Roy Collins | 358 | | |
| Conservative | Robert Fisher | 232 | | |
| Turnout | | | 47.55 | −5.9 |
| Liberal Democrats gain from Independent | | Swing | | |

=== Gowerton (one seat) ===
Ron Thomas narrowly failed in his bid to win back the seat he lost in 2008.

Gowerton 2012
| Party | Candidate | Votes | % | ±% |
|---|---|---|---|---|
| Independent | Susan Mary Jones* | 660 | | |
| Labour | Ronald Morgan Thomas | 608 | | |
| Conservative | Gordon Howells | 163 | | |
| TUSC | Les Woodward | 58 | | |
| Turnout | | | 37.0 | −4.9 |
| Independent hold | | Swing | | |

=== Killay North (one seat) ===
Killay North 2012
| Party | Candidate | Votes | % | ±% |
|---|---|---|---|---|
| Liberal Democrats | Mary Helen Jones* | 435 | | |
| Labour | Hannah Farrar | 198 | | |
| Conservative | Gareth Raymond Milne | 127 | | |
| Turnout | | | 22.7 | −11.6 |
| Liberal Democrats hold | | Swing | | |

=== Killay South (one seat) ===
Killay South 2012
| Party | Candidate | Votes | % | ±% |
|---|---|---|---|---|
| Liberal Democrats | Jeffrey William Jones | 429 | | |
| Labour | Peter Kenneth Jones | 327 | | |
| Conservative | Graham Richard Coombs | 111 | | |
| Turnout | | | 43.7 | −6.8 |
| Liberal Democrats hold | | Swing | | |

=== Kingsbridge (one seat) ===
Kingsbridge 2012
| Party | Candidate | Votes | % | ±% |
|---|---|---|---|---|
| Labour | William Evans* | 889 | | |
| Independent | Pat Griffiths | 285 | | |
| Turnout | | | 36.3 | −9.7 |
| Labour hold | | Swing | | |

=== Landore (two seats) ===
Landore 2012
| Party | Candidate | Votes | % | ±% |
|---|---|---|---|---|
| Labour | Beverley Hopkins | 1,040 | | |
| Labour | Thomas Michael White | 1,030 | | |
| Liberal Democrats | Vivian Nigel Abbott* | 472 | | |
| Liberal Democrats | Robert Speht* | 423 | | |
| Independent | Roger Berry | 77 | | |
| Conservative | Kate Horton | 39 | | |
| Conservative | Henri Lloyd Davies | 28 | | |
| Turnout | | | 35.1 | −0.8 |
| Labour gain from Liberal Democrats | | Swing | | |
| Labour gain from Liberal Democrats | | Swing | | |

=== Llangyfelach (one seat) ===
Llangyfelach 2012
| Party | Candidate | Votes | % | ±% |
|---|---|---|---|---|
| Independent | David Gareth Sullivan* | 776 | | |
| Labour | Richard Simpson | 344 | | |
| Green | John Edward Rasbridge | 72 | | |
| Turnout | | | 29.9 | −6.3 |
| Independent hold | | Swing | | |

=== Llansamlet (four seats) ===
Llansamlet 2012
| Party | Candidate | Votes | % | ±% |
|---|---|---|---|---|
| Labour | Christopher Ryland Doyle* | 2,185 | | |
| Labour | Penelope Margaret Matthews* | 2,154 | | |
| Labour | Uta Clay | 2,051 | | |
| Labour | Dennis Henry James* | 1,971 | | |
| Independent | June Evans* | 952 | | |
| Conservative | Roger George Campbell Evans | 354 | | |
| Conservative | Joshua Mark Gaskell | 335 | | |
| Conservative | Leigh Kristyn Moss | 328 | | |
| Labour hold | | Swing | | |
| Labour hold | | Swing | | |
| Labour hold | | Swing | | |
| Labour gain from Independent | | Swing | | |
| Turnout | | | 30.3 | −0.9 |

=== Lower Loughor (one seat) ===
Lower Loughor 2012
| Party | Candidate | Votes | % | ±% |
|---|---|---|---|---|
| Labour | Julie Christine Richards* | 436 | | |
| Liberal Democrats | Mike Sheehan | 100 | | |
| Plaid Cymru | Leigh Richards | 56 | | |
| Turnout | | | 33.0 | −3.7 |
| Labour hold | | Swing | | |

=== Mawr (one seat) ===
Mawr 2012
| Party | Candidate | Votes | % | ±% |
|---|---|---|---|---|
| People's Representative | Ioan Merritt Richard* | 295 | | |
| Labour | Rhys Aeron Jones | 213 | | |
| Plaid Cymru | Linda Mary Frame | 149 | | |
| Turnout | | | 44.8 | −3.8 |
| People's Representative hold | | Swing | | |

=== Mayals (one seat) ===
Mayals 2012
| Party | Candidate | Votes | % | ±% |
|---|---|---|---|---|
| Conservative | Linda Tyler-Lloyd | 283 | | |
| Independent | Peter Geoffrey Birch | 264 | | |
| Liberal Democrats | Keith Jones | 257 | | |
| Labour | Peter Rowlands | 163 | | |
| Independent | David Charles Evans | 29 | | |
| Turnout | | | 46.1 | −8.6 |
| Conservative hold | | Swing | | |

=== Morriston (five seats) ===
Morriston 2012
| Party | Candidate | Votes | % | ±% |
|---|---|---|---|---|
| Labour | John Davies | 2,599 | | |
| Labour | Robert Stewart* | 2,500 | | |
| Labour | Robert Francis-Davies* | 2,342 | | |
| Labour | Andrea Sharon Harrington | 2,302 | | |
| Labour | Yvonne Veronica Jardine | 2,190 | | |
| Independent | Adrian Davies | 869 | | |
| Plaid Cymru | Richard Jones Jones | 800 | | |
| Conservative | James Peter Hatton | 504 | | |
| Conservative | William Hughes | 501 | | |
| Conservative | Sheila Morgan | 467 | | |
| Conservative | Richard James Strick-Jenkins | 404 | | |
| Liberal Democrats | Ken Anderson | 351 | | |
| Conservative | Jennifer Margaret Bickerstaff | 341 | | |
| Liberal Democrats | Rosemarie Bridgeman | 276 | | |
| Liberal Democrats | Owen John Roberts | 254 | | |
| Liberal Democrats | Anjali Kadam | 187 | | |
| Labour hold | | Swing | | |
| Labour hold | | Swing | | |
| Labour hold | | Swing | | |
| Labour hold | | Swing | | |
| Labour hold | | Swing | | |
| Turnout | | | 30.0 | −4.7 |

=== Mynyddbach (three seats) ===
Mynyddbach 2012
| Party | Candidate | Votes | % | ±% |
|---|---|---|---|---|
| Labour | Ceinwen Thomas* | 1,348 | | |
| Labour | Byron George Owen* | 1,321 | | |
| Labour | Gloria Jean Tanner | 1,190 | | |
| Independent | Austin Raymond Welsby | 699 | | |
| Independent | Audrey Rose Ann Clement* | 683 | | |
| Independent | Noel Gordon West | 476 | | |
| Liberal Democrats | Ann Amina Jamal | 215 | | |
| Conservative | John Ward | 199 | | |
| Conservative | Emma Alice Lynall | 135 | | |
| Labour hold | | Swing | | |
| Labour hold | | Swing | | |
| Labour gain from Independent | | Swing | | |
| Turnout | | | 34.9 | −1.8 |

=== Newton (one seat) ===
Newton 2012
| Party | Candidate | Votes | % | ±% |
|---|---|---|---|---|
| Conservative | Crawshay Miles Thomas | 625 | | |
| Liberal Democrats | Simon Hugh Arthur | 423 | | |
| Labour | Greg Kaminaris | 228 | | |
| Conservative gain from Liberal Democrats | | Swing | | |
| Turnout | | | 45.9 | −2.0 |

=== Oystermouth (one seat) ===
Oystermouth 2012
| Party | Candidate | Votes | % | ±% |
|---|---|---|---|---|
| Conservative | Anthony Charles Saunders Colburn* | 500 | | |
| Labour | Pam Erasmus | 444 | | |
| Independent | Dorian Davies | 311 | | |
| Conservative hold | | Swing | | |
| Turnout | | | 47.2 | −5.7 |

=== Penclawdd (one seat) ===
Penclawdd 2012
| Party | Candidate | Votes | % | ±% |
|---|---|---|---|---|
| Labour | Mark Thomas | 819 | | |
| Independent | David Paul Tucker* | 493 | | |
| Conservative | Carole Maureen Hyde | 89 | | |
| Labour gain from Independent | | Swing | | |
| Turnout | | | 46.6 | −3.0 |

=== Penderry (three seats) ===
Penderry 2012
| Party | Candidate | Votes | % | ±% |
|---|---|---|---|---|
| Labour | Terry Hennegan | 1,216 | | |
| Labour | June Elizabeth Burtonshaw* | 1,182 | | |
| Labour | Hazel Mary Morris* | 1,092 | | |
| Green | James Anthony Young | 470 | | |
| Labour hold | | Swing | | |
| Labour hold | | Swing | | |
| Labour hold | | Swing | | |
| Turnout | | | 22.2 | −1.0 |

=== Penllergaer (one seat) ===
Penllergaer 2012
| Party | Candidate | Votes | % | ±% |
|---|---|---|---|---|
| Independent | Elizabeth Wendy Fitzgerald* | 744 | | |
| Labour | Tom Hoyles | 183 | | |
| Conservative | Lyndon Richard Jones | 25 | | |
| Independent hold | | Swing | | |
| Turnout | | | 42.5 | −3.1 |

=== Pennard (one seat) ===
Pennard 2012
| Party | Candidate | Votes | % | ±% |
|---|---|---|---|---|
| Independent | Lynda James | 442 | | |
| Independent | Peter Hugh Lanfear | 215 | | |
| Conservative | Patrick Morgan | 211 | | |
| Labour | Terry Scales | 131 | | |
| Plaid Cymru | Arthur John Rogers | 116 | | |
| Liberal Democrats | Andrew Crawford Thomas | 35 | | |
| Independent gain from Conservative | | Swing | | |
| Turnout | | | 52.3 | −4.9 |

=== Penyrheol (two seats) ===
Penyrheol 2012
| Party | Candidate | Votes | % | ±% |
|---|---|---|---|---|
| Labour | David William Cole | 1,036 | | |
| Labour | Jan Curtice | 904 | | |
| Plaid Cymru | Jim Dunckley | 346 | | |
| Plaid Cymru | Hannah Lowe | 248 | | |
| Independent | Victor Bruno | 200 | | |
| Labour hold | | Swing | | |
| Labour gain from Independent | | Swing | | |
| Turnout | | | 34.2 | |

=== Pontarddulais (two seats) ===
Pontarddulais 2012
| Party | Candidate | Votes | % | ±% |
|---|---|---|---|---|
| Labour | Philip Downing | 837 | | |
| Labour | Jane Harris | 657 | | |
| Independent | Byron Calvin Lewis | 495 | | |
| Independent | Don Richards | 452 | | |
| Independent | Valerie Anne Hedges | 437 | | |
| Independent | Dai Beynon | 346 | | |
| Independent | David Thomas Howells* | 227 | | |
| Conservative | Garath Williams | 124 | | |
| Conservative | Glen Brian Routledge | 92 | | |
| Labour hold | | Swing | | |
| Labour gain from Independent | | Swing | | |
| Turnout | | | 39.0 | −8.2 |

=== Sketty (five seats) ===
Sketty 2012
| Party | Candidate | Votes | % | ±% |
|---|---|---|---|---|
| Liberal Democrats | Rosina June Stanton* | 1,860 | | |
| Liberal Democrats | Arthur Michael Day* | 1,624 | | |
| Liberal Democrats | Cheryl Lynne Philpott* | 1,573 | | |
| Liberal Democrats | Thomas Huw Rees* | 1,433 | | |
| Liberal Democrats | Paul Michael Meara* | 1,293 | | |
| Labour | Paul Elliott | 1,286 | | |
| Labour | Carolyn Brown | 1,272 | | |
| Labour | Ian James | 1,253 | | |
| Labour | Paula Pritchard | 1,172 | | |
| Labour | Ashaa Rasul Iftikhar | 1,082 | | |
| Conservative | Anthony Trevor Lloyd | 1,014 | | |
| Conservative | Steve Jenkins | 866 | | |
| Conservative | Craig James Robert Lawton | 848 | | |
| Conservative | Daniel Stephen Boucher | 771 | | |
| Conservative | Dayne Ryan Powell | 665 | | |
| Independent | Ian Anthony McCloy | 600 | | |
| Plaid Cymru | Carl Harris | 529 | | |
| Plaid Cymru | Thomas Caldas | 450 | | |
| Plaid Cymru | Shan Couch | 412 | | |
| Plaid Cymru | Jon Howes | 411 | | |
| TUSC | Rob Williams | 195 | | |
| TUSC | Ronnie Job | 147 | | |
| Turnout | | | 38.0 | −5.5 |
| Liberal Democrats hold | | Swing | | |
| Liberal Democrats hold | | Swing | | |
| Liberal Democrats hold | | Swing | | |
| Liberal Democrats hold | | Swing | | |
| Liberal Democrats hold | | Swing | | |

=== St Thomas (two seats) ===
St Thomas 2012
| Party | Candidate | Votes | % | ±% |
|---|---|---|---|---|
| Labour | Joe Hale | 1,116 | | |
| Labour | Clive Lloyd | 968 | | |
| Independent | David Alan Robinson* | 554 | | |
| Independent | Terry Porter | 301 | | |
| Conservative | Ruth Lloyd | 73 | | |
| Conservative | Owain James Thomas | 64 | | |
| Labour gain from Independent | | Swing | | |
| Labour gain from Independent | | Swing | | |
| Turnout | | | 29.9 | −8.5 |

=== Townhill (three seats) ===
Townhill 2012
| Party | Candidate | Votes | % | ±% |
|---|---|---|---|---|
| Labour | Nicholas Stuart Bradley* | 1,116 | | |
| Labour | Lesley Virginia Walton | 1,110 | | |
| Labour | David Henry Hopkins* | 1,093 | | |
| Independent | Samantha Jayne Davies | 225 | | |
| Liberal Democrats | Douglas Hunt | 191 | | |
| Liberal Democrats | Christopher McColgan | 173 | | |
| Liberal Democrats | Samuel Rees | 144 | | |
| Conservative | Myles Langstone | 72 | | |
| Conservative | David Helliwell | 67 | | |
| Conservative | Amir Akhtar | 54 | | |
| Labour hold | | Swing | | |
| Labour hold | | Swing | | |
| Labour hold | | Swing | | |
| Turnout | | | 25.7 | −1.3 |

=== Uplands (four seats) ===
Uplands 2012
| Party | Candidate | Votes | % | ±% |
|---|---|---|---|---|
| Labour | Nick Davies | 1,302 | | |
| Labour | John Bayliss | 1,207 | | |
| Labour | Neil Ronconi-Woollard | 1,161 | | |
| Labour | Pearleen Sangha | 1,099 | | |
| Liberal Democrats | Peter Nicholas May* | 1,089 | | |
| Liberal Democrats | Stuart James Rice* | 975 | | |
| Liberal Democrats | Janet Mary Thomas* | 812 | | |
| Liberal Democrats | Jayne Woodman* | 782 | | |
| Green | Keith Malcolm Ross | 614 | | |
| Green | Andrew Russell Lumley Smith | 465 | | |
| Conservative | Millie Elizabeth Balkan | 319 | | |
| Conservative | Christian Peter Bickerstaff | 313 | | |
| Conservative | Thomas Giffard | 306 | | |
| Conservative | Sarah Anne Bickerstaff | 301 | | |
| Labour gain from Liberal Democrats | | Swing | | |
| Labour gain from Liberal Democrats | | Swing | | |
| Labour gain from Liberal Democrats | | Swing | | |
| Labour gain from Liberal Democrats | | Swing | | |
| Turnout | | | 26.8 | −3.0 |

=== Upper Loughor (one seat) ===
Upper Loughor 2012
| Party | Candidate | Votes | % | ±% |
|---|---|---|---|---|
| Labour | Robert Smith | 488 | | |
| Liberal Democrats | John Carpenter | 162 | | |
| Plaid Cymru | Rob Lowe | 124 | | |
| Labour gain from Plaid Cymru | | Swing | | |
| Turnout | | | 35.8 | −6.9 |

=== West Cross (two seats) ===
West Cross 2012
| Party | Candidate | Votes | % | ±% |
|---|---|---|---|---|
| Labour | Mark Clive Child* | 1,276 | | |
| Labour | Desmond Wilfred William Thomas* | 1,249 | | |
| Conservative | Lynne Davies | 723 | | |
| Conservative | Rebecca Taylor | 608 | | |
| Labour hold | | Swing | | |
| Labour hold | | Swing | | |
| Turnout | | | 38.9 | |

== By-Elections 2012-2017 ==
=== Llansamlet by-election 2013 ===
A by-election was held in Llansamlet on 4 July 2013 following the death of Labour councilor Dennis James. A former Labour MP held the seat.

Llansamlet 2014 by-election
| Party | Candidate | Votes | % | ±% |
|---|---|---|---|---|
| Labour | Robert Clay | 1,368 | 75.0 | |
| Conservative | James Hatton | 236 | 12.9 | |
| Liberal Democrats | Samuel Rees | 113 | 6.2 | |
| National Front | Claire Thomas | 108 | 5.9 | |
| Majority | | | | |
| Turnout | | | | |
| Labour hold | | Swing | | |

=== Uplands by-election 2014 ===
A by-election was held in Uplands ward on 20 November 2014 following the resignation of Labour councillor Pearleen Sangha. Peter May who lost the seat by 10 votes in 2012 won the seat back as an Independent.

Uplands by-election 2015
| Party | Candidate | Votes | % | ±% |
|---|---|---|---|---|
| Independent | Peter May | 671 | 32.8 | |
| Labour | Fran Griffiths | 533 | 26.1 | |
| Liberal Democrats | Janet Thomas | 215 | 10.5 | |
| Green | Ashley Wakeling | 179 | 8.8 | |
| Independent | Pat Dwan | 158 | 7.7 | |
| Conservative | Josh Allard | 154 | 7.5 | |
| Plaid Cymru | Rhydian Fitter | 104 | 5.1 | |
| TUSC | Ronnie Job | 31 | 1.5 | |
| Majority | | | | |
| Turnout | | | | |
| Independent gain from Labour | | Swing | | |
