= Kingsbridge, Swansea =

Coordinates: 51.66304°N 4.04005°W

Kingsbridge: Welsh: Pontybrenin
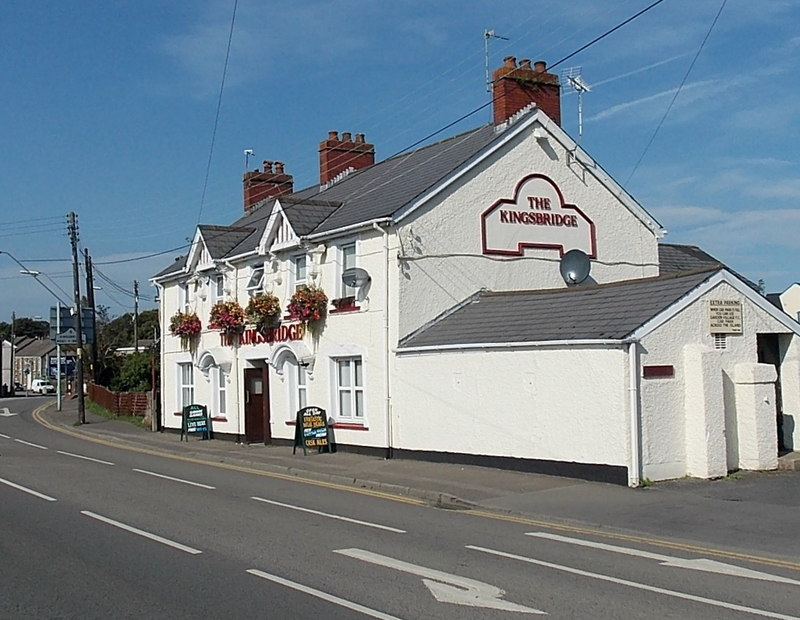

- Location within Swansea
- Population: 4,008 (Census 2011)
- Principal area: Swansea
- Preserved county: West Glamorgan
- Country: Wales
- Sovereign state: United Kingdom
- Post town: SWANSEA
- Postcode district: SA4
- Dialling code: 01792
- Police: South Wales
- Fire: Mid and West Wales
- Ambulance: Welsh
- UK Parliament: Gower
- Senedd Cymru – Welsh Parliament: Kingsbridge ward

Kingsbridge (Welsh: Pontybrenin), is a village in the City and County of Swansea, Wales falling within the Kingsbridge ward. It covers the south east of the town of Gorseinon.

Kingsbridge lies to the south of Gorseinon and Penllergaer, to the east of Penyrheol, to the north of Gowerton and Cockett, and to the west of Penderry.

Kingsbridge has a Welsh Football League club called Garden Village AFC. There is a small business park on the outskirts of the village. The premises of two south and west Wales radio stations called Swansea Sound and 96.4 The Wave are located in Kingsbridge. There are two local Primary Schools. YGG Pontybrenin teaches through the medium of Welsh, whilst Pontybrenin Primary School teaches through the English Language. The Gorseinon Campus of Gower College Swansea is also located in the area.

== See also ==
- Garden Village, Swansea
