= Penyrheol =

Penyrheol may refer to:

- Penyrheol, Caerphilly
- Penyrheol, Pontypool
- Penyrheol, Swansea
  - Penyrheol (Swansea electoral ward)
- Penyrheol, an area of Town, Merthyr Tydfil
