= Kian Hire =

Welsh rugby union player

- Born: 30 September 2004 (age 22) Wales
- Height: 188 cm (6 ft 2 in)
- Weight: 122 kg (269 lb; 19 st 3 lb)
- School: Pontarddulais Comprehensive School; Gower College Swansea

Rugby union career
- Position: Prop
- Current team: Ospreys
Senior career
Years	Team	Apps	(Points)
2025–	Ospreys	5	(0)
- Correct as of 11 January 2026
International career
Years	Team	Apps	(Points)
2023–2024	Wales U20	13	(0)
- Correct as of 11 January 2026

Kian Hire (born 30 September 2004) is a Welsh rugby union player, who plays for the Ospreys in the United Rugby Championship. His preferred position is prop.

== Early career ==
Hire is from Wales and came through the Ospreys academy, representing their U18 side in 2021/22 and 2022/23. He attended Pontarddulais Comprehensive School, before studying at Gower College Swansea to combine rugby with education. He represented the Wales U20 side in both 2023 and 2024.

== Professional career ==
Ahead of the 2024–25 United Rugby Championship, Hire was named in the Ospreys development squad, being allocated to Swansea RFC while a transition player. He would debut for the Ospreys in round 18 of the season against the Lions. He was again allocated to Swansea for the 2025/26 season as he continued to make appearances for the Ospreys.
