= Kingsbridge (disambiguation) =

Kingsbridge is a market town and tourist hub in the South Hams district of Devon, England.

Kingsbridge or King's Bridge may also refer to:

== Places ==
=== United Kingdom ===
- Kingsbridge, Somerset, England
- Kingsbridge, Swansea, Wales
  - Kingsbridge (electoral ward), in the City and County of Swansea
- Kingsbridge Hundred, an administrative hundred in Wiltshire, England
- King's Bridge, Belfast, a bridge across the River Lagan in Belfast, Northern Ireland
- King's Bridge, Glasgow, a 1933 bridge in Glasgow, Scotland

=== United States ===
- Kingsbridge, Bronx, New York, a neighborhood
  - Kingsbridge Armory
- Kingsbridge Heights, Bronx, New York, a neighborhood
- Kingsbridge, Wisconsin, an unincorporated community
- King's Bridge (Pennsylvania), a bridge in Pennsylvania

=== Elsewhere ===
- Kingsbridge, Ontario, Canada
- Kingsbridge Wind Power Project, Ontario, Canada
- King's Bridge (Launceston), a bridge in Launceston, Tasmania, Australia
- Kingsbridge Station, original name of Heuston railway station, Dublin, Ireland

== Fiction ==
- Kingsbridge, a fictional town in the Ken Follett novels The Pillars of the Earth and sequels

== See also ==
- Kingbridge Centre, conference centre in Canada
