= Gorseinon =

Town near Swansea, Wales

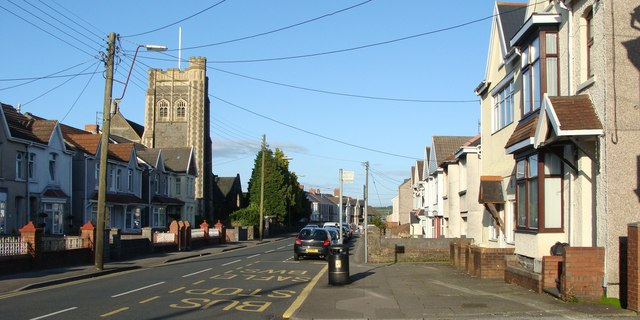

- Location within Swansea
- Population: Town: 8,696; Urban Area: 20,581
- OS grid reference: SS585985
- Principal area: Swansea
- Preserved county: West Glamorgan
- Country: Wales
- Sovereign state: United Kingdom
- Post town: SWANSEA
- Postcode district: SA4
- Dialling code: 01792
- Police: South Wales
- Fire: Mid and West Wales
- Ambulance: Welsh
- UK Parliament: Gower
- Senedd Cymru – Welsh Parliament: Gŵyr Abertawe
- List of places UK Wales Swansea 51.66°N 4.03°W Map of the community

Gorseinon is a town within the City and County of Swansea, Wales, near the Loughor estuary. It was a small village until the late 19th century, when it grew around the coal mining and tinplate industries. It is around 6 miles (10 km) north west of Swansea City Centre. Gorseinon is a local government community with an elected town council.

The population of the Gorseinon town council area in the 2011 Census was 8,693. However, the ONS defines an area called the Gorseinon Urban Area, which comprises all of the continuous built-up area in and around Gorseinon. This area includes Gorseinon, Loughor, Garden Village and Penllergaer and had a population of 20,581.

== Toponymy ==
The name Gorseinon means "Einon's marsh", from the soft mutated form of Welsh cors "marsh" and the male personal name Einon, the identity of whom is uncertain. Einon is the southern form of the name Einion. The reason for the mutation is unclear, and one might expect "Corseinon". The short name of the village in Welsh is Y Gors (the marsh). Here the soft mutation is entirely regular (occurring when a feminine noun follows the definite article), and it may have spurred the change of Corseinon to Gorseinon. A "standard" form of the name, Corseinion, is seen in an appeal to his fellow tinplate workers by Y Cymro Coch in 1882.

== History ==
=== Religious development ===
In 1840 the population of Gorseinon was barely 250 people. There were then two churches in the area. One was St Teilo's Church, Llandeilo Tal-y-bont, also known as the “Church on the Marsh” – this has now been rebuilt in the St Fagans National History Museum in Cardiff. The other church was Brynteg Chapel, the only nonconformist chapel for miles, which was built in 1815 and still stands.

Several churches and chapels were built in the 1880s. The first church in the town was Holy Trinity Church, built in 1882 and extended in 1884. Seion Baptist Church opened in 1886, built on a riverbank at the bottom of Gorseinon, but by 1902 a new Seion was built in the High Street. The old Seion was taken over by the English Methodists, but this eventually became the Moose Hall. Bethel English Congregational Church (Evangelical) was built in 1894. West Street Bethel Chapel in Masons Road was built as an English Congregationalist church. Ebenezer, the Welsh Congregational Chapel opened in 1887, but by 1909 a new chapel was built near Seion Capel.

St. Catherine's Church was built in 1913 and the Salvation Army church in 1910. A Roman Catholic church in Pontardulais Road was built in 1932 and a new church was built on Alexandra Road in the 1960s, designed by the architect Robert Robinson, a local Gower man. There has also been a Christadelphian meeting hall in the town since 1926.

=== Agricultural and industrial development ===
Gors Eynon first appeared on an Ordnance Survey map in 1813, but by 1830 the name appeared in its modern spelling.

The monks of Neath Abbey paid many visits to this locality, and as evidence of this there were several mills built on the banks of local rivers: Cadle Mill, on the Lliw, Pontlliw, Melyn Mynach, and Loughor Mill.

There was one weaving mill and two flour mills on the river. These were worked by the monks to provide food and clothing for the abbey; the wool was brought here from Gower sheeplands.

By the end of the 13th century the monks at Melyn Mynach owned vast acreage devoted to sheep farming. They produced high quality wool at Cwrt Y Carnau, which was traded in Flanders and Italy.

After the arrival of the Black Death and bubonic plague in the 14th century, labour became scarce, and the monks were forced to sell or rent to the local farmers. Eventually, during Henry VIII's reign, the few monks that were left were pensioned off, and their land passed into Crown hands.

John Pryce, a legal gentleman, who was originally from the area but had moved to London, returned to raise a family at Cwrt Y Carne. In 1575 he purchased the manor and land, and also the mill at Melyn Mynach (melin being the Welsh for "mill"). The whole estate totalled over 130 acres (0.53 km^{2}). Pryce tried to squeeze every penny out of his tenant farmers, and many disputes followed. The Pryce family prospered, and by the early 18th century the name had changed to Price.

The last owner of the Melyn Mynach was Nathaniel Cameron, mayor of Swansea and the husband of a Price family member. He also owned the Mountain Colliery; but after getting into financial difficulties he sold the mill to William Lewis, the founder of Gorseinon.

There were few industries but coal was plentiful. A drift was opened in 1846 and became known as "The Mountain Coal". This coal was transported on a narrow gauge railway line to Loughor, where it was loaded onto barges and sent to Llanelli for export.. The drift mine continued to be worked until 1900, when a shaft was sunk. Now known as the Mountain Colliery, at its peak it produced over 200,000 tons of coal a year, with a workforce in excess of 900. It closed in 1969.

In 1860 the LNWR wanted to extend its railway line from Pontarddulais to Swansea. William Lewis, a young industrialist, sold them the land, and a station was built in 1870; this became known as Gorseinon Station. The Mountain Colliery laid a siding from the colliery to the station, and coal was redirected to Swansea Docks.

The first day-school was opened in 1880 at Penyrheol. The headmaster, a Mr Jones, afterwards transferred to Gorseinon. As Gorseinon's industries grew, so did its housing and streets, with the development of Mill Street, Gorseinon Terrace, Eynon Street and High Street.

In 1886 the Grovesend Tin Works was built, and the Lewis family built many houses around the area to house the workers. The Grovesend Steelworks opened in 1890, but in 1891 all tinplate workers in South Wales were involved in a seven-month strike and times were very hard for the workers.

Gorseinon had two public houses, the Gorseinon Hotel (the Bottom Hotel) and the Station Hotel (the Gyp). It was said that the Bottom Hotel was for miners and the Gyp was for tinplate workers, and it was a mortal sin to encroach on another man's territory. Then in 1892 the West End Hotel was built, and the Mardy in 1901, bringing the number of public houses to four. The Gorseinon Hotel is no longer a pub but a Seagers steakhouse restaurant.

Gorseinon Institute opened in 1904, and in 1908 the Bryngwyn Sheetworks was opened.

== Governance ==
=== County Council ===
Prior to local government re-organisation in 1996, the town of Gorseinon was administered as part of the Lliw Valley district, and before that by Llwchwr Urban District Council. Since 1996, Gorseinon has been governed by the City and County of Swansea council and falls within the Gorseinon and Penyrheol electoral wards.

=== Town Council ===
The community of Gorseinon comprises the Gorseinon ward and the southern part of the Penyrheol ward. The Gorseinon Town Council developed from the former Gorseinon Community Council in 1998, since when it is empowered to appoint a town mayor annually. The council now comprises sixteen unpaid volunteers who are elected every four years. The council meet at Gorseinon Institute every first Wednesday to discuss local business and planning applications.

== Economy ==
Gorseinon has a busy high street area in the centre of the town. The other major areas of employment are the nearby Garngoch Industrial estate, in Penllergaer, Gorseinon Business Park and Kingsbridge Business Park. Previously, the nearby Bryngwyn steel works and Valeo plant were major employers in the town, however they closed in the 1990s. In response to the closures, the National Assembly for Wales set up the Gorseinon Regeneration Strategy to invest in a number of regeneration schemes in the town.

A large Asda store opened in September 2010.

The Canolfan Gorseinon Centre was built on the old Bryngwyn Steel Works and is a charity-run, community-based centre. Several local charities and organisations are based here, including

- Gorseinon Development Trust
- Gorseinon Food Bank
- Musicality – Academy of Performing Arts
- Gorseinon Food Festival
- Gorseinon Community Cinema
- Gorseinon Players

Gorseinon Development Trust is a locally-run charity that works on issues such as car parking, business, litter, historic areas, tourism and parks in the area.

=== Twin town ===
The town of Gorseinon along with the community of Llwchwr is twinned with Ploërmel, France.

== Facilities ==
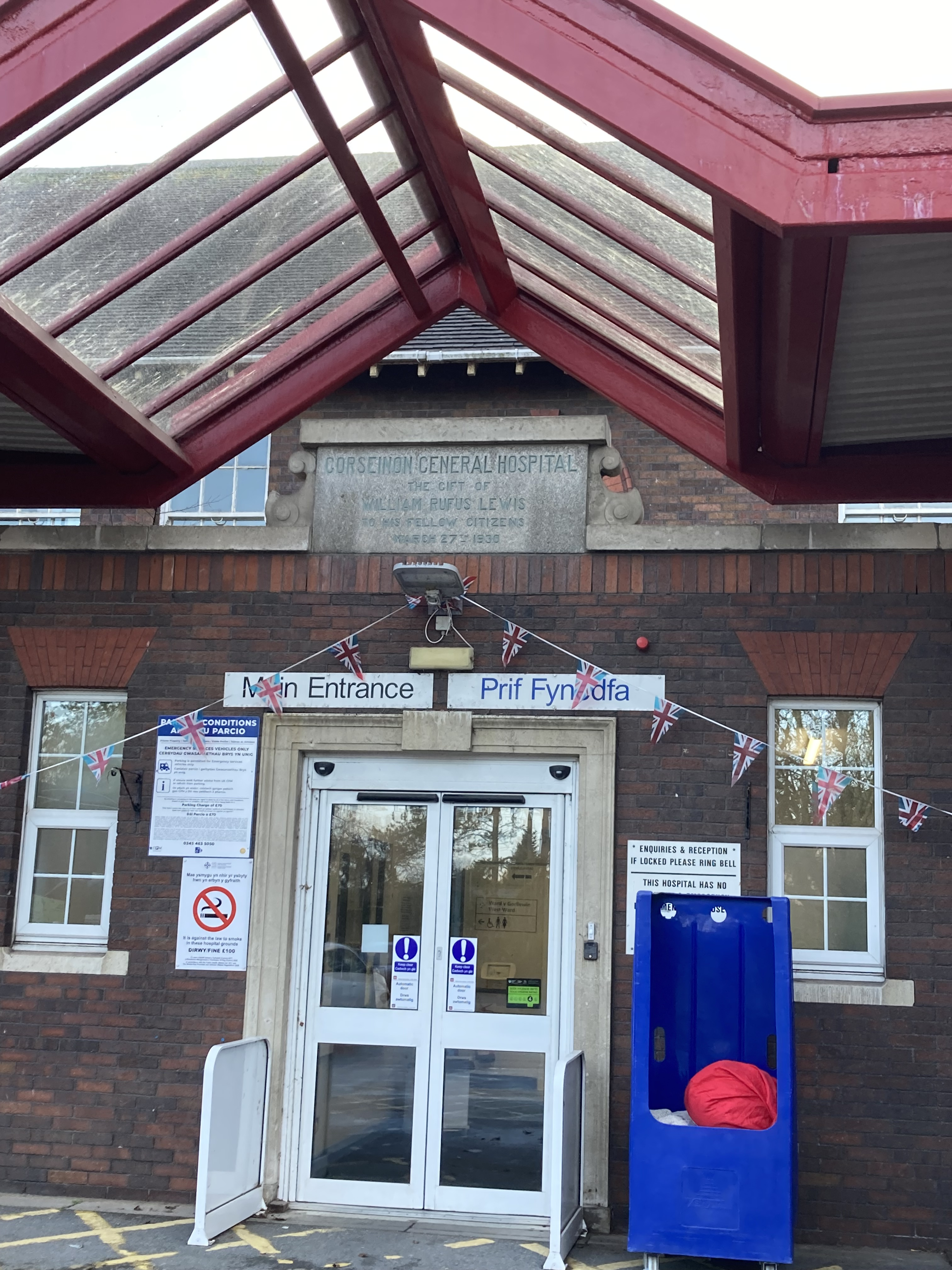
Front entrance of Gorseinon Hospital

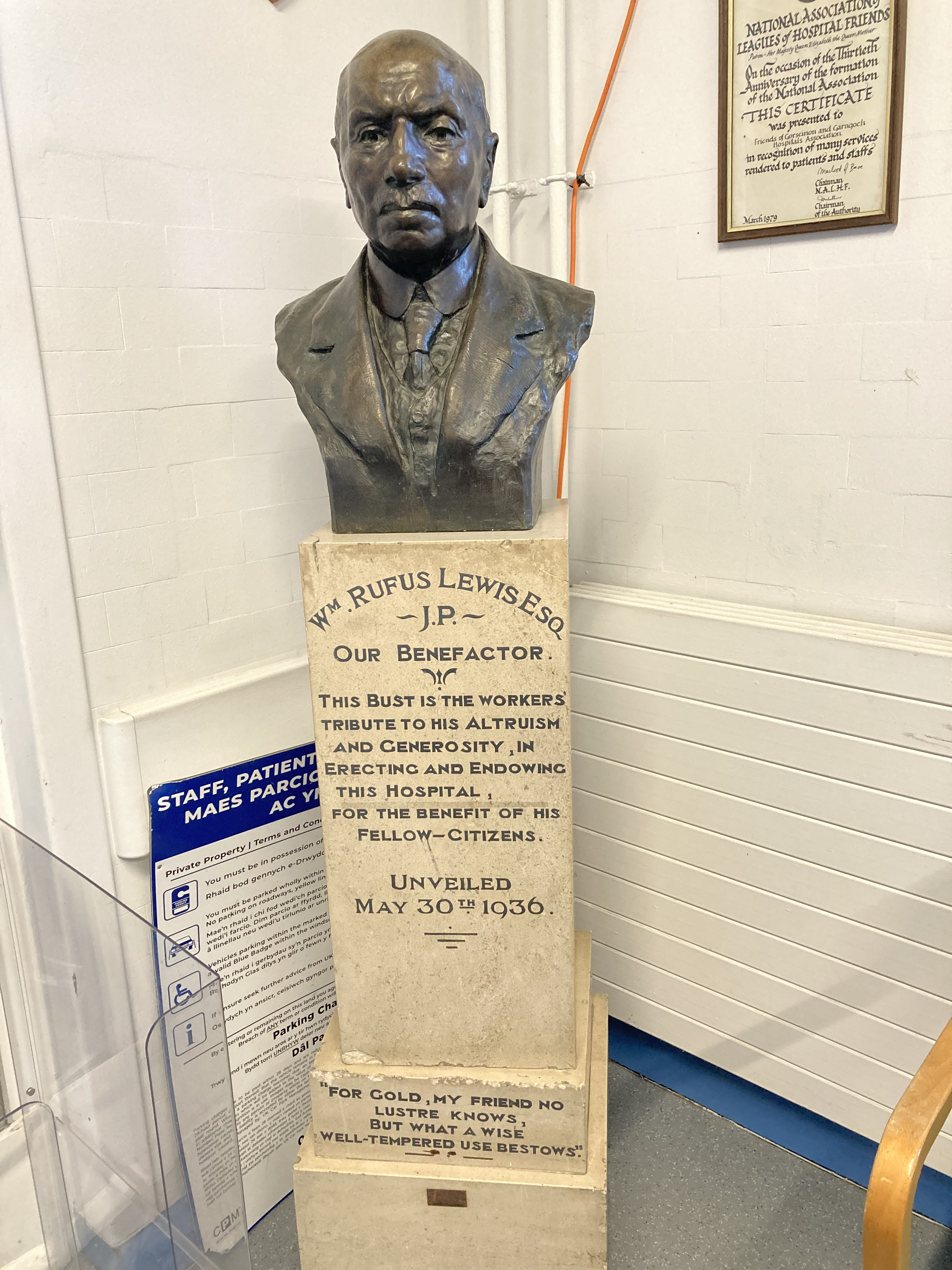
Bust of William Rufus Lewis in Gorseinon Hospital

The town has local hospital, now known as Gorseinon Hospital, donated to the community in 1930 prior to the establishment of the National Health Service by the local industrialist, (William) Rufus Lewis, who also established Parc y Werin (People's Park).

Gorseinon has a library, a district housing office and a post office.

== Sport and leisure ==
- Gorseinon RFC play Rugby Union in WRU Division One West.
- Garden Village FC play in the Welsh Football League Division Two.
- Gorseinon Cricket Club play in the South Wales Cricket Association Division One.
- Gower Riders cycling club are based in the town and hold an annual cyclo-cross race at Melin Mynach in the town.
- Swansea Sharks roller hockey club play in the South Wales region of the BIPHA.
- Garngoch Golf Club, Gorseinon, operated between about 1930 and 1950.

The local area hosted the National Eisteddfod in 1980.

For more than 50 years, Gorseinon was home to 'La Charrette', the UK's smallest cinema, established by local electrician, the late Gwyn Phillips. Built from a disused railway carriage, the cinema opened in 1953; when the decay of its structure forced closure in February 2008, 'La Charrette' was dismantled and taken to the Gower Heritage Centre. The last film shown at La Charette was a black-tie premiere of Danny Boyle's Alien Love Triangle attended by Kenneth Branagh, who starred in the film, and organised by Observer film critic Mark Kermode.

The recently opened Canolfan Gorseinon Centre features a multi-use hall, training rooms, office room for small businesses, a creche and a bar and cafe.

== Education ==
Gorseinon Primary School, which has three sites in the town, provides pre-school and primary education. There is a proposal to build a new primary school at Parc y Werin to replace the existing school buildings.

Most eleven to sixteen-year-old children in the area attend Penyrheol Comprehensive School, an English-medium school. The school buildings were largely destroyed by an arson attack in 2006. The rebuilt school was opened in 2009.

One of the campuses of Gower College Swansea is in Gorseinon, providing further education and adult learning.

== Notable residents ==
- Keith Allen, actor
- Aneirin Talfan Davies, Welsh language poet, broadcaster and literary critic
- Sir Alun Talfan Davies, judge, publisher and politician
- Colin Edwards, (1924–1994) radio journalist and documentary film maker
- Norman Gale, Welsh rugby union captain
- Lord Garel-Jones, Conservative MP for Watford and government minister
- James Henry Govier, (1910–1974) painter, etcher and engraver lived in Gorseinon from 1914 to 1945
- David Rhys Grenfell, born in nearby Penyrheol, local Member of Parliament for 37 years, Father of the House of Commons
- Leigh Halfpenny, Welsh international and British & Irish Lions rugby union player
- Michael Howard, politician, Conservative Party leader and Home Secretary
- Gwynne Howell, operatic bass
- Leighton James, Welsh international footballer
- Robbie James, Welsh international footballer
- Phil John, rugby union player
- Colin Jones, welterweight boxer
- Lewis Jones, dual-code Welsh international rugby footballer
- Richard Moriarty, Welsh rugby union captain
- Beth Morris, television actress
- Jessica Sula, actress
- Elin Manahan Thomas, classical soprano, broadcaster and presenter
- Imogen Thomas, model

== Transport ==
Gorseinon bus station is located just off West Street in the town centre. Bus services are provided by First Cymru with services to the surrounding villages and to Llanelli and Swansea city centre. The bus station was rebuilt making an improvement to the area. The town lost its train service in 1964 under the Beeching Axe; the nearest railway station is now Gowerton railway station, around 1.8 miles (2.9 km) to the south of the town centre.

The primary route through Gorseinon is the A4240 road which crosses the town centre as High Street and Alexandra Road. The A4240 connects Gorseinon with Llanelli to the west; and Penllergaer and the M4 Motorway (Junction 47) to the east.

== Geology ==
=== Bedrock Geology ===
==== Grovesend formation ====
Gorseinon is built upon the Grovesend formation. The rocks are predominantly argillaceous, comprising mudstones and siltstones, with well-developed coals, minor lithic ("Pennant") sandstones, and locally developed red mudstones in the type area.

Lower boundary

The base is placed at the base of the Swansea Four-Feet Coal of the Swansea district (equivalent of the Llantwit No. 3 Seam in the Pontypridd district and the Mynyddislwyn Seam east of the Taff valley), where it overlies mudstone seatearth at the top of the predominantly arenaceous Swansea Member in the Swansea district and the similar Hughes Member in the east of the coalfield. It is a conformable boundary in the west, but is assumed to be an unconformable one in the east. Also taken at the base of the laterally correlatable Rudge Coal in the Radstack part of the Somerset Coalfield, the High Coal of the Bristol Coalfield and the Avonmouth No. 1 Coal of the Severn Coal Basin.

Upper boundary

The Grovesend Formation is the youngest unit found in the South Wales and Forest of Dean coalfields. It is overlain unconformably by sandstones of the Sherwood Sandstone Group in the Newent Coalfield, by mudstones of the Mercia Mudstone Group in the Oxfordshire Coalfield and either the Sherwood Sandstone or Mercia Mudstone groups in the Bristol/Somerset Coalfields.

==== Swansea Member Formation ====
Small outcrop of this formation occurs to East of a fault which has a north–south orientation which is in the penllergaer region of Gorseinon. Lithological characteristics are green-grey, lithic arenites ("Pennant sandstones") with thin mudstone/siltstone and seatearth interbeds, and mainly thin coals. Description of the lower boundary of this formation is that the base is placed at the base of the Golden Seam (Swansea Three Feet or Graigola) (Woodland et al., 1957), where the coal rests on mudstone seatearth within a predominantly arenaceous sequence of the Pennant Sandstone Formation. Description of the upper boundary of this formation is that the top is placed at the base of the Wernffraith Seam (correlated with the Mynyddislwyn Seam of the eastern part of the South Wales Coalfield) where the coal overlies mudstone seatearth with a predominantly arenaceous sequence of the Pennant Sandstone Formation, and is overlain conformably by the mudstone-dominated succession of the Grovesend Formation.

=== Drift Geology ===
The most common drift deposits in Gorseinon are Devension till (boulder clay) glacial deposits. The Afon Lliw is dominated by alluvium deposits. Tidal flat deposits occur east of Gorseinon near the estuary.

=== Economic Geology ===
There are several coal mines and shafts in South Gorseinon. There are also abundant aggregate quarries in North Gorseinon. There are coal seams at the southern and eastern limits of Gorseinon.

=== Structural Geology ===
There is a large axial plan of an anticline south of the hospital in Gorseinon, with a north west-south east orientation. There are four major faults with a north–south orientation in the Gorseinon region.
