= Gorseinon College =

Further education college in Wales

- Coleg Gorseinon (Welsh)
- Gorseinon College logo
- Type: Further Education College
- Established: 1955
- Principal: Mark Jones
- Administrative staff: 350 Approx
- Students: 4000 Approx
- Location: Belgrave Road; Gorseinon, Swansea SA4 6RD, Swansea, West Glamorgan, Wales, United Kingdom
- Campus: Belgrave Road
- Website: https://www.gcs.ac.uk/

Gorseinon College (Welsh: Coleg Gorseinon) was a further education college situated to the west of Swansea, in the suburb of Upper Loughor in Gorseinon. It was frequently ranked as one of the best sixth-form colleges in Wales and the United Kingdom. Recently the college was rated as 'outstanding' by Her Majesty's Inspectorate for Education and Training. Gorseinon College merged with Swansea College on 20 August 2010 to create a single sixth form and further education college for the Swansea area called Gower College Swansea.

The college was established in 1955 as a mining college for the local area. By 1982, the college became a tertiary college, and was incorporated in 1993. It had over 1,700 full-time students and over 1,900 part-time students in 2006/7, which placed it as a medium-sized college by Welsh standards. During the late 1990s, the college had a high increase in the number of students with an FTE base of 1,800. Gorseinon College offered a range of course from nearly 50 A and AS level subjects ranging from Classics to Environmental Studies to Mathematics and Media Studies, over 20 vocational subjects from Motor Vehicles to Engineering to Information Technology. The college also had several other preparation courses such as Army and Oxbridge preparation courses, the latter of which was rated as an 'Outstanding feature of the college.

== Campus and catchment area ==
The college operated on several different sites in Gorseinon.

- Belgrave Road Campus – Main site of the college, provided A level and all Vocational Courses ranging from AVCEs to NVQs to BTEC awards. The Motor Vehicle department recently moved to the main site into a brand new purpose-built facility.
- LifeLong Learning Centre, Gorseinon – Established in 2001 to provide continuing and further education for adults.
- Canolfan Gorseinon, Gorseinon – Established in 2008 to deliver practical arts courses for adults.

The college predominantly recruited from two local comprehensives: Pontarddulais and Penyrheol. The college also served and recruited from the surrounding nine wards. However, the college tended to attract students from all over the City and County of Swansea as well as the adjacent local authorities of Carmarthenshire and Neath Port Talbot.

== Awards and results ==
In 2008 the college's results for A levels were:-

- 98.5% overall pass rate
- 57.1% A or B grade passes
- 80.4% A, B or C grade passes

The AS Level results for 2008 were:-

- 93.5% overall pass rate
- 49.5% A or B grade passes
- 71% A, B or C grade passes

For vocational courses in 2005 the results were:-

- 94.7% overall pass rate in AVCEs
- 100% overall pass rate in BTEC national diplomas and certificates
- 94.2% overall pass rate in BTEC first diplomas

The college won the Beacon Award in 1999–2000, 2003-2004 along with being highly commended in 2003–2004. The college also won "The Best Further Education College in Wales Award" from the Welsh Livery Guild. More recently Gorseinon College celebrated after receiving an Association of Colleges' Beacon Award 2009-2010 for its Knowledge Transfer Partnership, which has helped create 100 local jobs, at a presentation ceremony in Westminster, London on 10 February. Gorseinon College was presented with the Welsh Assembly Government Award for College Engagement with Employers by Kevin Brennan MP, Minister of State for Further Education. The Award recognised best practice in meeting the needs of employers.

== Merger with Swansea College ==
On 20 August 2010, Gorseinon College merged with Swansea College to create a single further education college for all of Swansea called Gower College Swansea. . Public consultation on the details of the merger is ongoing. The merger process was scheduled to be completed in August 2010 and the public consultation document indicates that the new merged institution will operate out of both of the current colleges' main sites. The merged institution will retain both college identities with the current Gorseinon campus at Belgrave road becoming 'Gorseinon Centre' or 'Gorseinon Sixth Form College'. Longer-term plans for the newly merged institution include the eventual construction of a new campus in Swansea city centre and Swansea College vacating its Tycoch site.
