= Eli Walker =

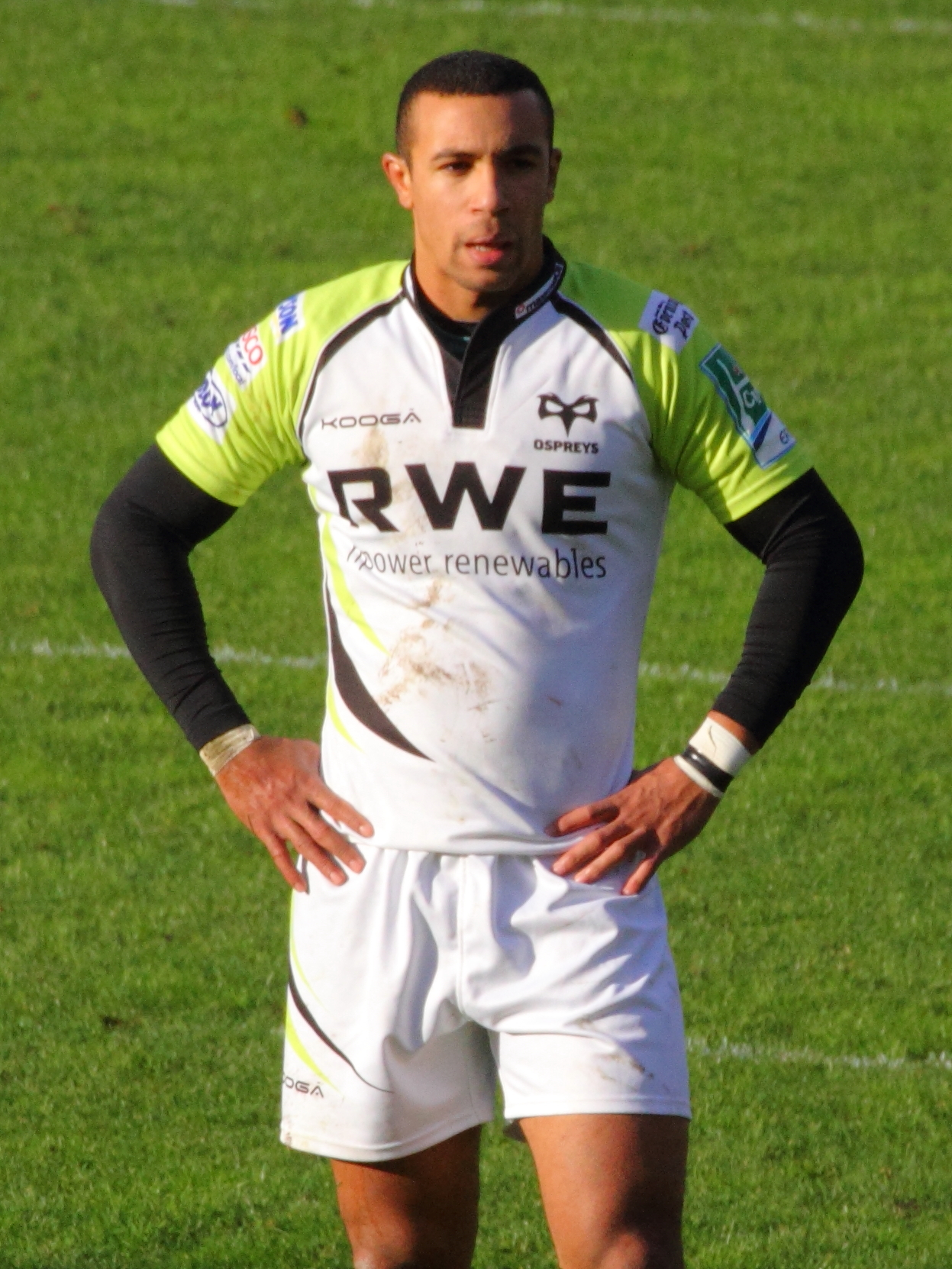
- Born: Eli Walker; 28 March 1992 (age 34) Swansea, Wales
- Height: 1.83 m (6 ft 0 in)
- Weight: 89 kg (14 st 0 lb)
- School: Penyrheol Comprehensive School; Gower College Swansea; Cardiff University

Rugby union career
- Position: Wing
Youth career
- Gorseinon
Amateur team(s)
Years	Team	Apps	(Points)
2010–2012	Swansea	29	(65)
Senior career
Years	Team	Apps	(Points)
2010–2018	Ospreys	75	(110)
- Correct as of 2 March 2018
International career
Years	Team	Apps	(Points)
2011–2012	Wales U20	9	(25)
2015	Wales	1	(0)
- Correct as of 8 August 2015

Eli Walker (born 28 March 1992) is a Welsh retired international rugby union player who played for the Ospreys as a winger. He previously played for Swansea.

== Career ==
Walker first broke into the Ospreys team during the 2011–12 Pro12 season, starting seven matches as they won the title.

For the 2012–13 Pro12 season, Walker started to play in the Ospreys first team, winning a place in the starting line up. He started the season in good form, scoring a try in a man of the match performance against Connacht, and followed it with another try the next week against Leinster.

His domestic form carried into the 2012–13 Heineken Cup, once again scoring a try and earning a man of the match award, this time against European powerhouse Toulouse.

Walker suffered a foot injury during the Ospreys Anglo-Welsh Cup clash against Cardiff Blues on 18 November 2016. He began his recovery, but suffered a back injury in December. Despite surgery and over a year of rehabilitation, Walker announced his retirement due to this injury in March 2018.

== International ==
In April 2012 he was named in the Wales U-20 squad for the Junior World Cup in South Africa. He started on the wing as Wales beat New Zealand, a first ever win for Wales at the Under 20s level against the Baby Blacks.

Off the back of his form for the Ospreys, Walker was selected in the 35 man Wales squad for the 2013 Six Nations. He did not feature during the tournament, suffering a hamstring injury before the tournament.

A back injury near the end of the 2012–13 season ruled Walker out of the summer tour to Japan.

For the 2013 Autumn Internationals, Walker was once again selected in the Wales squad, and named to start against South Africa. Walker suffered a hamstring injury in training and was ruled out prior to making his debut.

Walker made his full international debut in the starting line up for Wales versus Ireland on 8 August 2015. On 8 September 2015, Walker was chosen as a replacement for Leigh Halfpenny in the 2015 Rugby World Cup squad after Halfpenny suffered a knee injury in a warm up match against Italy. However Walker himself then had to withdraw with a hamstring injury and he was replaced by Ross Moriarty.

On 11 October, Liam Williams was ruled out of the World Cup having suffered an injury against Australia, and Walker re-joined the squad to replace him. He was allowed to re-join the squad, as he had been released from the team before Wales officially arrived in tournament. Walker's injury meant he would not be fit to play against South Africa, and could only represent Wales if they made it to the semi-final. Wales were knocked out in the quarter-finals, and therefore Walker did not feature further.
