= Lliw Valley =

Former district of West Glamorgan, Wales

Coordinates: 51.762°N 3.965°W

Lliw Valley Welsh: Dyffryn Lliw
- Borough
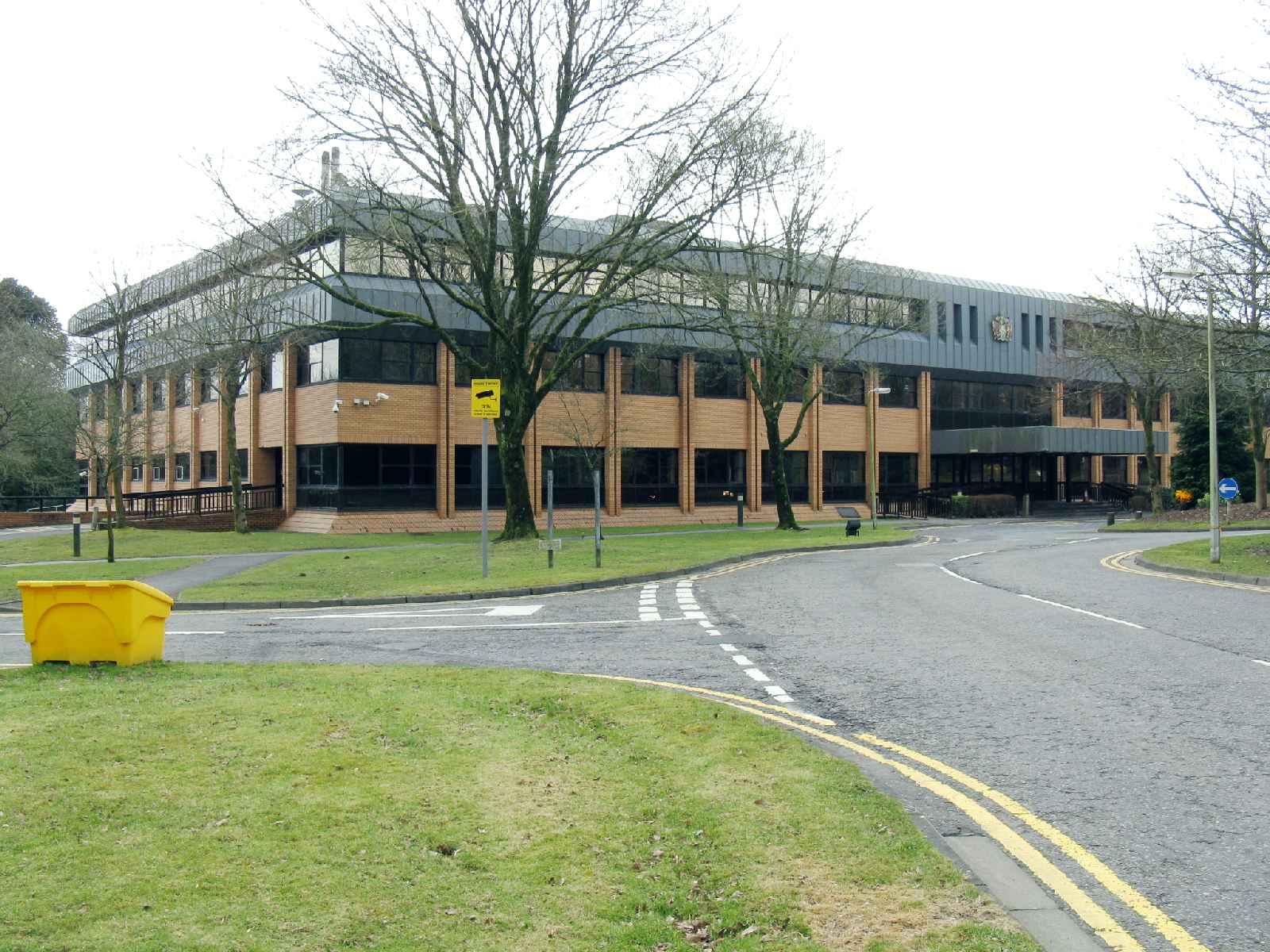
- Civic Centre, Penllergaer: Council's headquarters from 1981

- History
  - Created: 1 April 1974
  - Abolished: 31 March 1996
  - Succeeded by: Swansea; Neath Port Talbot
- Government
  - HQ: Penllergaer
  - Motto: Nid da lle gellir gwell (From good things to better)
- Contained within
  - County Council: West Glamorgan

Lliw Valley (Welsh: Dyffryn Lliw) was a local government district with borough status in West Glamorgan, Wales from 1974 to 1996.

== History ==
The borough was created on 1 April 1974 under the Local Government Act 1972, which reorganised local government across Wales and England. The new borough covered the area of the former Llwchwr Urban District and Pontardawe Rural District. The new district was named after the Afon Lliw and its valley, which ran through the centre of the new borough. It was one of four districts within the new county of West Glamorgan.

The borough was abolished in 1996, when West Glamorgan County Council was abolished and the districts in the county reorganised to become principal areas. Lliw Valley was split between the principal areas of Swansea and Neath Port Talbot.

Communities becoming part of Swansea:

- Clydach
- Gorseinon
- Gowerton
- Grovesend
- Llangyfelach
- Llwchwr
- Mawr
- Penllergaer
- Pontarddulais
- Pontlliw

Communities becoming part of Neath Port Talbot:

- Cilybebyll
- Cwmllynfell
- Gwaun-Cae-Gurwen
- Pontardawe
- Trebanos
- Ystalyfera

== Political control ==
The first election to the council was held in 1973, initially operating as a shadow authority alongside the outgoing authorities until it came into its powers on 1 April 1974. Throughout the council's existence the Labour Party held a majority of the seats on the council.

Party in control	Years
Labour	1974–1996

== Premises ==
The council inherited offices at West Street in Gorseinon from Llwchwr Urban District Council and at Holly Street in Pontardawe from Pontardawe Rural District Council. It shared its functions between these offices until 1981 when it moved to a purpose-built Civic Centre at Penllergaer. After the council's abolition the former civic centre was used for some years by Swansea Council as secondary offices, before being demolished to make way for a residential development called Mansion Gardens.
