= Beth Morris =

British stage and screen actress (1943–2018)

- Born: 19 July 1943; Gorseinon, Wales
- Died: 1 March 2018 (aged 74); Penllergaer, Wales
- Occupation: Actress
- Years active: 1969–2004
- Spouse(s): Stephen Moore (m. 1974; div. 1986)
- Partner: Bill Nighy

Bethan "Beth" Morris (19 July 1943 – 1 March 2018) was a Welsh actress.

Born in Gorseinon and a lifetime native of Swansea, she was probably best known for her performance as Julia Drusilla in the 1976 BBC adaptation of I, Claudius. Her career spanned from 1969 to 2004 and other notable TV credits include: Softly, Softly, Dixon of Dock Green, I'll Fly You for a Quid, David Copperfield, Thriller, Blake's 7, Armchair Thriller, Minder, The District Nurse and Time Trumpet.

Among her stage roles, she appeared in Bertolt Brecht's Edward II at the Round House Theatre in London.

== Personal life ==
Bethan Morris was born in 1943 to Charles Emlyn Morris (1915–1983) and Gwendoline Lillias (John) Morris (1915–2011). She married actor Stephen Moore in the Borough of Lewisham, London in 1974. After they divorced in 1986, she was a partner of actor Bill Nighy. She lived in Y Garn, Penllergaer, and was found dead in her home on St David's Day at the age of 74.

== Selected filmography ==
- Crucible of Terror (1971)
- That'll Be the Day (1973)
- Tales That Witness Madness (1973)
- Son of Dracula (1974)

== Selected television roles ==
Year	Title	Role
1973	Seven of One	April Owen – Episode "I'll Fly You For a Quid"
1974	David Copperfield	Dora
1976	I, Claudius	Drusilla
1976	Thriller	Sally Kirby – Episode "Dial a Deadly Number"
1978	Blake's 7	Sara
1980	Armchair Thriller	Valerie Foreman – Serial "The Circe Complex" (6 episodes)
1980	Minder	Jackie
1993	Telltale	Rosie Douglas
1996	The Bill	Michelle Stubbs
