= Gorseinon (electoral ward) =

Coordinates: 51.67203°N 4.04045°W

Gorseinon ward
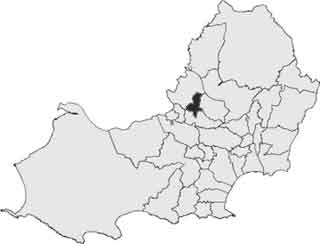
- Area: 2.23 km^{2} (0.86 sq mi)
- Population: 4,301 (2011 census)
  - Density: 1,929/km^{2} (5,000/sq mi)
- Principal area: Swansea
- Preserved county: West Glamorgan
- Country: Wales
- Sovereign state: United Kingdom
- UK Parliament: Gower
- Senedd Cymru – Welsh Parliament: Gower
- Councillors: David Lewis (Labour)

Gorseinon is an electoral ward in the City and County of Swansea, Wales.

The Gorseinon community comprises the electoral ward of Gorseinon and part of the Penyrheol ward. Gorseinon has its own elected town council.

The electoral ward consists of Gorseinon town and the surrounding rural areas, in the parliamentary constituency of Gower. The ward and community are coterminous with each other and encompass the town.

Prior to local government re-organisation in 1996, the town of Gorseinon was administered as part of the Lliw Valley district. Since 1996, Gorseinon has been governed by the City and County of Swansea council.

The ward is bounded by Penyrheol to the north west, Penllergaer to the east and Kingsbridge to the south.

The community of Gorseinon, together with the community of Llwchwr is twinned with Ploermel in France.

For the 2012 local council elections, the turnout in Gorseinon was 32.70%. The Results were:

Candidate	Party	Votes	Status
David Lewis	Labour	538	Labour hold
Darren Thomas	Plaid Cymru	275	
Beverly Howard	Independent	184	
Elizabeth Thomas	Conservative	58	
