= Swansea College =

UK academic institution

- Swansea College Logo
- Type: Further Education College
- Principal: Jeff Gunningham
- Administrative staff: 1,000
- Students: 15,000
- Location: Tycoch Road, Swansea, West Glamorgan, SA2 9EB, Wales
- Website: www.swancoll.ac.uk

Swansea College was a further education college in Swansea, Wales. It was one of the largest further education colleges in Wales with over 15,000 students and employing approximately 1,000 staff. Swansea College merged with Gorseinon College on 20 August 2010 to create a single sixth form and further education college for the area called Gower College Swansea.

Swansea College provided preparation for a number of qualifications, including GCSEs, the IB Diploma Programme, A-levels and HNDs, as well as a number of vocational courses leading to BTEC First and National Diplomas, NVQs and other similar qualifications. It also ran English as a Foreign Language programmes for non-native speakers of English.

The College's mission statement was: "We will provide high quality, relevant provision for all our learners."

== Campus and catchment area ==
The College operated on several different sites in Swansea.

- Tycoch Campus – Sketty: main site of the College, provided A level, IB and all vocational courses ranging from NVQs to BTEC awards.
- Llwyn-Y-Bryn – Uplands: site for visual and performing arts.
- Kingsway Centre – city centre
- Business College – Llansamlet
- Several other sites, including Sketty Hall and local schools, were used for courses.

== Faculties and services ==
=== A-level and the arts ===
The faculty was split into two areas: a specially designed 'B Floor' at the College's Tycoch campus and purpose-built Arts, Media and Performance suites at Llwyn y Bryn. The faculty provided preparation for a number of qualifications, including A-levels, the IB and HNDs, as well as a number of vocational courses leading to BTEC First and National Diplomas, NVQs and other similar qualifications.

==== 2008 results ====
- 99.3% of students passed their A Level courses.
- 15% of these had A grades, 47% A or B and 78% A, B or C.
- 93% of students passed their AS Level courses.
- 100% of students passed the International Baccalaureate Diploma.

=== Sport, lifestyle and business ===
Extracurricular opportunities were offered, including work experience, educational visits, visiting speakers and entrepreneurship guidance. Courses were designed to provide the student with the knowledge and skills to progress into employment or higher education qualifications in sport, leisure, tourism, business, hospitality or public services.

The faculty also housed the Centre for Sporting Development which is dedicated to the physical, personal and intellectual development of student athletes.

=== Engineering, IT and technology ===
These courses were designed to provide students with a choice of routes into a range of disciplines for either Higher Education or employment. They gave the student a chance to develop the skills, knowledge and understanding that underpin the creation of Engineering and IT systems and services.

The faculty had fully equipped workrooms as well as specialist computer software.

=== Social and vocational studies ===
Students of hairdressing, beauty and complementary therapy could take part in work experience in a salon environment at either its Broadway or Cefn Hengoed Centre. Health and social care courses were also offered.

=== Community operations ===
Community Operations worked closely with partner organisations in Swansea to help to coordinate basic skills and adult community courses throughout the city. Opportunities were on offer to help people improve their employability by encouraging confidence and developing skills for life.

=== Training for business ===
The Business College was the commercial arm of Swansea College. Many programmes carried national accreditation. Others were bespoke, tailored to the student's particular needs. The Business College was based in Swansea Vale and offers training courses such as NEBOSH, IOSH, CIEH, BIIAB, OCR, RTITB, CMI, ILM, First Aid and NVQ.

=== Work-based learning ===
Swansea College offered modern apprenticeships throughout the year. There are different levels of apprenticeships available and on successful completion students are awarded with a nationally recognised Modern Apprenticeship framework.

Levels included: Foundation Modern Apprentice (NVQ Level 2) Advanced Modern Apprentice (NVQ Level 3/4) Modern Skills Diploma (NVQ Level 4/5)

== Results and awards ==
In 2008, the College's pass rates were:

=== Level 3 courses ===
- 99.3% on A Level Courses.
- 88% on National Diploma Courses
- 80% on National Certificate Courses
- 90% on NVQ Level 3 programmes
- 100% on the International Baccalaureate Diploma

=== Level 2 courses ===
- 93% at GCSE
- 91% at First Diploma level
- 91% on NVQ Level 2 programmes

=== Others ===
- 95% on Level One GNVQ Foundation Courses
- 92% on Introductory Courses

=== Awards ===
The College won the LSDA Beacon Award (for Staff Development in ILT) in 1999-2000.

== History ==
The original Swansea College was built in 1825 and was situated near the Swansea Dock area. This building also housed the guildhall, law courts and juvenile centre after being rebuilt in 1848. From 1960, the building was solely used as a college of further education, housing 700 students. After rapid expansion, the college relocated to a new site in Tycoch in 1971.

The further education corporation with the name of "Swansea College" was established by the Education (Further Education Corporations) Order 1992 (S.I. 1992/2097)

Swansea College merged with Gorseinon College on 20 August 2010 to create a single sixth form and further education college for the Swansea area called Gower College Swansea.
