= Pontarddulais Comprehensive School =

Location
- Caecerrig Road; Pontarddulais, Swansea, SA4 8PD; Wales; 51.7174°N 4.0339°W

Information
- Type: Comprehensive
- Motto: Live to Learn – Learn to Live
- Established: 1982; 44 years ago
- Local authority: Swansea
- Department for Education URN: 401772 Tables
- Head teacher: Gareth Rees
- Staff: Approx. 80
- Gender: Co-educational
- Age: 11 to 16
- Enrolment: 859 (2024)
- Language: English
- Colours: Red & Black
- Estyn School Number: 670/4072
- Website: www.pontcomp.co.uk

Pontarddulais Comprehensive School is an 11–16 mixed comprehensive school situated in the town of Pontarddulais, Wales. It is maintained by the Local Education Authority (LEA), the City and County of Swansea. It is mainly fed by primary schools in Pontarddulais, Pontlliw, Penllergaer, Llangyfelach, Ammanford and Pengelli.

== Notable former pupils ==
- Keira Bevan – Rugby Union (Bristol Bears Women, Wales)
- Lukas Carey – Cricket (Glamorgan)
- Aneurin Donald – Cricket (Glamorgan, Hampshire & England)
- James Harris – Cricket (Glamorgan, Middlesex & England Under-19)
- Joe Rodon – Football (Tottenham Hotspur & Wales)
- Aaron Shingler – Rugby Union (Scarlets & Wales)
- Steven Shingler – Rugby Union (Scarlets, Cardiff Blues & Wales Under-20)
