= Stafford Common =

Sports venue in Kingsbridge, Swansea, Wales

Coordinates: 51.659°N 4.036°W

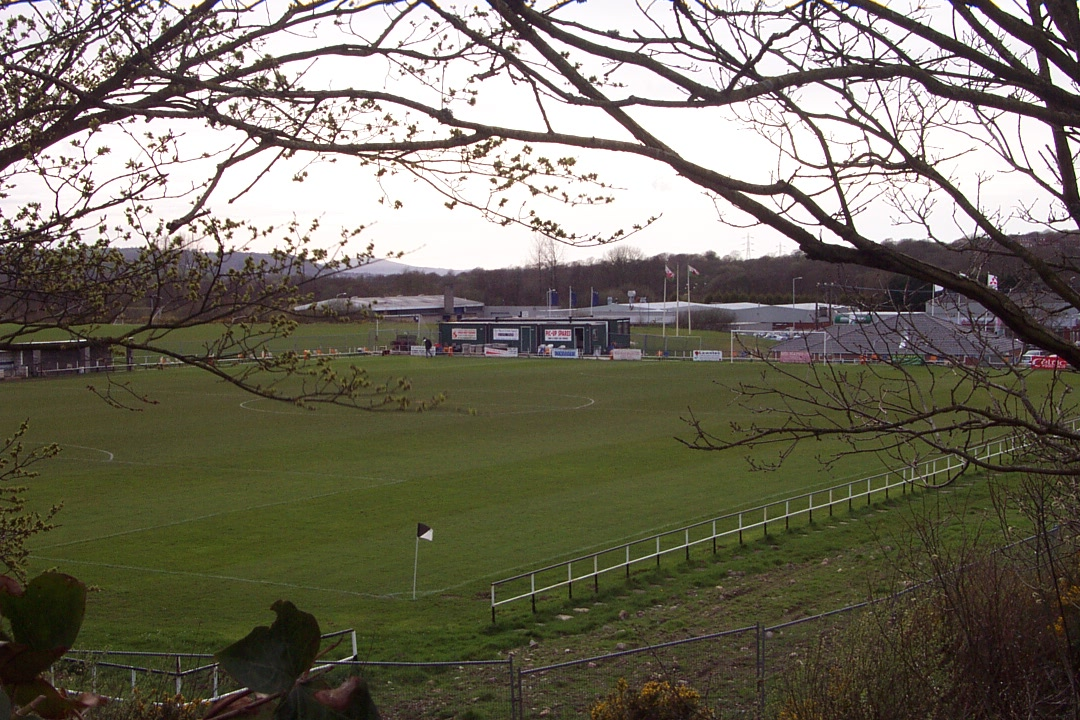
- Interactive map of Stafford Common
- Full name: Stafford Common
- Location: Kingsbridge, Swansea
- Owner: Garden Village FC
- Capacity: 2,000 (no seating)
- Field size: 110 x 70 yards

Construction
- Opened: 1922

Tenants
- Garden Village FC; Swansea City Women

Stafford Common is home to the Garden Village Football Club, located in the village of Kingsbridge in the west of Swansea.

== Pitches ==
There are three full size pitches, one of them used by the two senior teams who play in the Welsh Football League (first team in Division 2 and the second team in Reserve Division West) and Swansea City Women..

The other two pitches are used by the two senior teams who play in the Carmarthenshire League (third team in Division 1 and fourth team in Reserve Division 1) as well as the Junior sides.

The main pitch at Stafford Common is also used to host local and regional cup ties, including finals. And in September 2010 it hosted its first ever international - Wales women's Under-17 side beat Belgium 1–0 to register their first ever win at that level.

== Facilities ==
There is a clubhouse at the ground situated between the car park and the changing room facility, which consists of a bar, plasma television screen, a pool table and plenty of seating.

The changing rooms were opened in July 2005 by the President of the club, Mr. Jack Thomas. There are four full-size changing rooms available to cater for two matches at a time, a treatment room and disabled toilet facilities.

New floodlights were added to Stafford Common in January 2011. This is a major development and has been eagerly anticipated for years.
