= Penlan =

Suburban area of Swansea, Wales

Coordinates: 51°39′11.00″N 3°58′14.00″W

Penlan is a suburban area of Swansea, Wales in the Penderry ward. The area is set on top of a hill, which overlooks Townhill, Kilvey Hill and Swansea Bay.

== Leisure ==
Local amenities include the Penlan leisure centre, which incorporates a swimming pool and sports hall, and the Penlan Library..

== Transport ==
The headquarters of the main public transport company serving South West Wales, First Cymru, is also located here.

== Education and religion ==
Penlan is home to Ysgol Gyfun Gymraeg Bryn Tawe, a Welsh-medium secondary school. There are two Primary Schools which are Clwyd Community Primary and Afryn. The area is served by two churches. Penlan Methodist Church, in existence for fifty years, and Cornerstone Church, a thriving evangelical church which was established in 1991.

The hymn tune 'Penlan' was written in 1890 by the composer David Jenkins (1848–1915) and is frequently sung to the words 'In heavenly love abiding'.

== Housing ==
Penlan is a Communities First area.
