= Gowerton (electoral ward) =

Coordinates: 51.64507°N 4.03924°W

Gowerton Ward
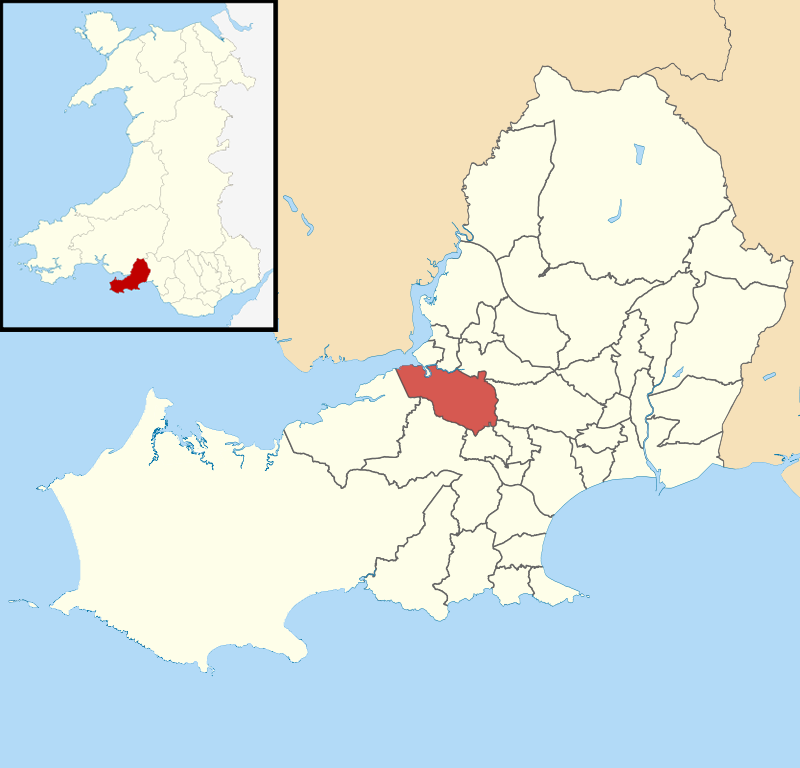
- Location of Gowerton ward within the City and County of Swansea
- Area: 7.55 km^{2} (2.92 sq mi)
- Population: 5,212 (2011 census)
  - Density: 690/km^{2} (1,800/sq mi)
- Principal area: Swansea
- Preserved county: West Glamorgan
- Country: Wales
- Sovereign state: United Kingdom
- UK Parliament: Gower
- Senedd Cymru – Welsh Parliament: Gŵyr Abertawe
- Councillors: Susan Mary Jones (Independents)

Gowerton (Welsh: Tregŵyr) is an electoral ward in the county of Swansea, Wales, UK. It is named after Gowerton village which falls within the ward. The Gowerton community boundaries are coterminous with the ward.

The electoral ward consists of some or all of the following areas: Gowerton, Penclawdd, Waunarlwydd, in the parliamentary constituency of Gower. It is bordered by Penclawdd and Fairwood to the south west; Killay North and Killay South to the south; Cockett to the east; and Lower Loughor, Upper Loughor, the Loughor estuary and Kingsbridge to the north.

The turnout for Gowerton in the 2012 local council elections was 37.02%. The results were:

Candidate	Party	Votes	Status
Susan Mary Jones	Independents	660	Independents hold
Rob Thomas	Labour	608	
Gordon Howells	Conservative	163	
Les Woodward	Trade Unionist and Socialist Coalition	58	
