= Upper Loughor =

Coordinates: 51.66279°N 4.05450°W

Upper Loughor Ward
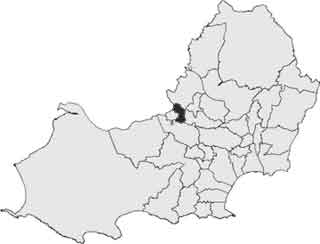
- Area: 1.61 km^{2} (0.62 sq mi)
- Population: 2,771 (2011 census)
  - Density: 1,721/km^{2} (4,460/sq mi)
- Principal area: Swansea
- Preserved county: West Glamorgan
- Country: Wales
- Sovereign state: United Kingdom
- UK Parliament: Gower
- Senedd Cymru – Welsh Parliament: Gŵyr Abertawe
- Councillors: Darren Price (Plaid Cymru)

Upper Loughor (Welsh: Casllwchwr Uchaf) was an electoral ward in the City and County of Swansea, Wales. The ward covered the eastern part of the town of Loughor in the parliamentary constituency of Gower.

It was bounded by Lower Loughor and the Loughor estuary to the west; Penyrheol to the north; Kingsbridge to the east and Gowerton to the south.

In the 2008 local council elections, the turnout for Upper Loughor was 42.69%. The results were:

| Candidate | Party | Votes | Status |
|---|---|---|---|
| Darren Price | Plaid Cymru | 531 | Plaid Cymru hold |
| Harding John (Snr.) Richards | Labour | 199 | |
| Wynford Jones | Independents | 105 | |
| Alan Thomas Protheroe | Conservatives | 89 | |
