= Ysgol Gyfun Gymraeg Bryn Tawe =

School in Swansea, UK

Coordinates: 51.651°N 3.959°W

Information
- Established: 2003; 23 years ago
- Grades: Year 7 - Year 11
- Language: Welsh

Ysgol Gyfun Gymraeg Bryn Tawe is a Welsh-language comprehensive school based in Penlan, Swansea, southwest Wales. It opened in 2003 to complement Ysgol Gyfun Gwyr and to provide additional capacity following the increased demand for Welsh-medium education in the area. Upon its opening, it held only its own fresh intake, taking none of Gwyr's existing pupils. As a result, the school only reached its full complement of years 7-11 (ages 11–16) with its fifth intake of September 2007. As of September 2012 it has approximately 900 pupils on roll.

The site was previously occupied by Penlan Senior Comprehensive School for Boys.

In September 2008, a sixth form partnership was opened with Ysgol Gyfun Gŵyr, and pupils have access to subjects on both sites.
