= Oakleigh House School =

Coordinates: 51.621687°N 3.972536°W

Location
- 38 Penlan Crescent; Uplands, Swansea, SA2 0RL; Wales

Information
- Type: Private
- Motto: Best for your child... best from your child
- Established: 1919
- Closed: 2025
- Department for Education URN: 401996 Tables
- Gender: Coeducational
- Age: 2.5 to 11

Oakleigh House School was a co-educational private primary school in Swansea, Wales. The school was owned and operated by the Cognita Group and situated in the Uplands area of the city.

== History ==
Oakleigh House School was established in 1919. In 1995, it became part of the Ffynone House School Trust, and in 2007 it joined the Cognita Group of Schools.

In 2016, the School received the NACE Cymru Challenge Award.

In May 2025, the school announced that it would close in December of that year.

== Notable former pupils ==
- Michael Heseltine
- Eddie Izzard
- Alun Wyn Jones
