= Pontarddulais (electoral ward) =

Coordinates: 51.71865°N 4.04834°W

Pontarddulais Ward
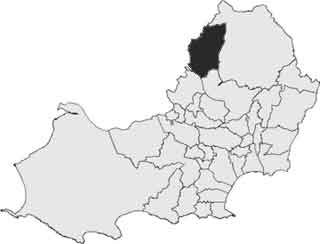
- Area: 15.61 km^{2} (6.03 sq mi)
- Population: 6,281 (2011 census)
  - Density: 402/km^{2} (1,040/sq mi)
- Principal area: Swansea
- Preserved county: West Glamorgan
- Country: Wales
- Sovereign state: United Kingdom
- UK Parliament: Gower
- Senedd Cymru – Welsh Parliament: Gŵyr Abertawe
- Councillors: Phillip Downing (Labour); Jane Harris (Labour)

Pontarddulais is a name of an electoral ward and parish of the City and County of Swansea, south Wales. The parish of Pontarddulais has its own elected town council.

The electoral ward covers the town of Pontarddulais and its surrounding rural areas, in the parliamentary constituency of Gower. The electoral ward is bounded by Mawr to the east; Llangyfelach to the south east; and Penyrheol to the south west.

For the 2012 local council elections, the turnout for Pontarddulais was 39.01%. The results were:

Candidate	Party	Votes	Status
Phillip Downing	Labour	837	Labour hold
Jane Harris	Labour	657	Labour gain
Byron Lewis	Independent	495	
Don Richards	Independents	452	
Valerie Hedges	Independents	437	
David Beynon	Independents	346	
David Howells	Independents	227	
Garath Williams	Conservatives	124	
Glen Routledge	Conservatives	92	
