= Swansea Bay Sea School =

The Swansea Bay Sea School is a marine-based training and educational organisation based in Swansea, Wales. Its aims are to train young people from disadvantaged backgrounds in seamanship and other marine activities. The patron of the school is Tracey Edwards.

The school is equipped with its own Challenge Yacht, a £1.2 million 72 ft 18 berth racing yacht - the largest in Wales.
