= Penyrheol Comprehensive School =

Comprehensive school in Gorseinon, Wales

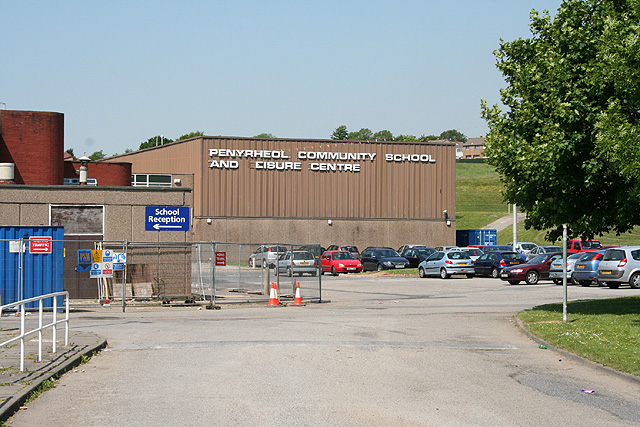

Location
- Pontarddulais Road; Gorseinon, Glamorganshire, SA4 4FG; Wales; 51.676°N 4.043°W

Information
- Type: Comprehensive
- Motto: To Achieve You Need To Believe
- Established: 1973; 53 years ago
- Local authority: Swansea
- Head teacher: Damian Benney
- Gender: Co-educational
- Age: 11 to 16
- Enrolment: 920
- Website: www.penyrheol.com

Penyrheol Comprehensive School is a secondary school in Gorseinon, Swansea, Wales.

== Admissions ==
It has around 1,000 pupils from the Penyrheol, Gorseinon, and Loughor areas. It is situated just east of the B4296, accessed via two miles along the A4240 from junction 47 of the M4.

Although it used to have a sixth form, this was disbanded in 2013. It serves Gorseinon, Loughor, Penyrheol, Kingsbridge and Garden Village.

== History ==
It was formerly administered by West Glamorgan County Council (based in Swansea).

== 1976 fire ==
The school had to be rebuilt due to a fire in 1976 which destroyed half of the school. Thirty years later, much the same thing would happen again and a similar financial shortfall in the cost from what was available from insurance cover.

== New building ==
The school has a new £9.9 million building which was opened 4 September 2009, Designed by Stride Treglown and built by Carillion, and includes a sprinkler system and more CCTV.

== Notable former pupils ==
- Leigh Halfpenny, rugby player
- Colin Jones, Welterweight boxer
- Adam Matthews, footballer
- Eli Walker, rugby player
- Jessica Sula, actress
- Matt Ryan (actor), Actor
- Kevin Allen, actor, director
- Craig Harries, Rally driver
