= Kingsbridge (electoral ward) =

Coordinates: 51.66304°N 4.04005°W

Kingsbridge Ward
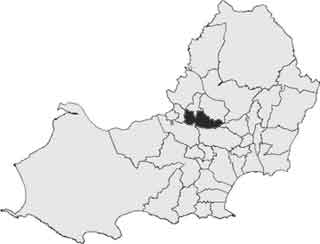
- Area: 4.82 km^{2} (1.86 sq mi)
- Population: 4,008 (2011 census)
  - Density: 832/km^{2} (2,150/sq mi)
- Principal area: Swansea
- Preserved county: West Glamorgan
- Country: Wales
- Sovereign state: United Kingdom
- UK Parliament: Gower
- Senedd Cymru – Welsh Parliament: Gower
- Councillors: William Evans (Labour)

Kingsbridge (Welsh: Pontybrenin) was an electoral ward in the City and County of Swansea, Wales. It was part of the Llwchwr Town council area.

The Kingsbridge ward was bordered by the wards of Gowerton, Cockett and Penderry to the south; Gorseinon and Penllergaer to the north and Upper Loughor to the west.

The electoral ward consisted of some or all of the following areas: Kingsbridge, Garden Village and Stafford Common in the parliamentary constituency of Gower. Kingsbridge is a mainly rural ward but it also has a scattering of industrial areas.

For election purposes, Kingsbridge is broken down into the polling districts of Kingsbridge and Garden Village.

For the 2012 local council elections, the turnout was 36.25%. The results were:

Candidate	Party	Votes	Status
William Evans	Labour	889	Labour hold
Pat Griffiths	Independent	285	
