= Penllergaer (electoral ward) =

Coordinates: 51.66990°N 4.00709°W

Penllergaer Ward
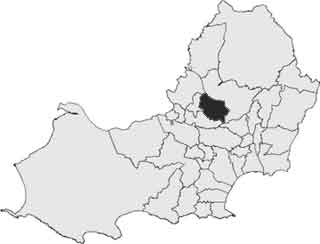
- Area: 6.01 km^{2} (2.32 sq mi)
- Population: 2,868 (2011 census)
  - Density: 477/km^{2} (1,240/sq mi)
- Principal area: Swansea
- Preserved county: West Glamorgan
- Country: Wales
- Sovereign state: United Kingdom
- UK Parliament: Gower
- Senedd Cymru – Welsh Parliament: Gower
- Councillors: Wendy Fitzgerald (Independent)

Penllergaer is an electoral ward (and a community) in the City and County of Swansea, Wales, UK. It has its own elected community council.

The electoral ward consists of Penllergaer, East and West, in the parliamentary constituency of Gower. It is a mainly rural ward with grassland to the south and woodland to the north. It is bordered by the wards of Llangyfelach to the northeast; Penderry to the south; Kingsbridge to the south west; Gorseinon to the west, Penyrheol to the north west.

In the 2008 local council elections, the turnout for Penllergaer was 45.56%. The results were:

Candidate	Party	Votes	Status
Wendy Fitzgerald	Independent	873	Independents hold
Nigel Mark Rees	Labour	56	
Paul Werner Sivertsen	Conservative	48	
Carol Smith	Green Party	27	

In the 2012 local council elections, the turnout for Penllergaer was 42.47%. The results were:

Candidate	Party	Votes	Status
Wendy Fitzgerald	Independents	744	Independents hold
Tom Hoyles	Labour	183	
Lyndon Richard Jones	Conservative	25	
