= Ysgol Gyfun Gŵyr =

Secondary school in Swansea, Wales

Coordinates: 51°38′45″N 4°2′21″W

Location
- Talbot Street; Swansea, City and County of Swansea, SA4 3DB; Wales

Information
- Type: Secondary School
- Motto: Gorau byw, cyd-fyw
- Established: 1984
- Local authority: Swansea
- Chair: Aldyth Williams
- Headteacher: Mrs Sara Thomas
- Staff: 98
- Age: 11 to 18
- Enrolment: 1156 (2024)
- Language: Welsh
- Houses: Branwen, Caradog, Dylan, Gwenllian, Llyr, Olwen, Nudd and Peredur.
- Website: www.yggwyr.org.uk

Ysgol Gyfun Gŵyr is a Welsh-medium secondary school for pupils aged between 11 and 19 years. The school is situated in Gowerton, Swansea, Wales. It was established in 1984.

As of 2023, Ysgol Gyfun Gŵyr had 1113 pupils enrolled at the school, with 27.5 per cent of those coming from Welsh-speaking homes.

Notable past students include footballer John Hartson, soprano Elin Manahan Thomas and UFC fighter Brett Johns.

In 2001 the school, as the only Welsh-speaking secondary school in Swansea, was encountering capacity problems, having to accommodate over 1,000 pupils in buildings that were designed for a capacity of 750. Proposals were made to move the school to the site of Penlan Comprehensive School, which was shortly to close. However parents and Staff protested against the move, resulting in a second Welsh-language school in Swansea (Ysgol Gyfun Gymraeg Bryn Tawe)

According to the latest inspection report from Estyn the school has a GCSE pass rate of 76% (based on 5 GCSEs, grades A-C), which puts it in 5th place in Wales or in the top 10%. In Swansea it is ranked 1st place for best school.

In 2015, the Rugby 1st XV won the Ospreys under 18s School League, beating Gowerton Comprehensive School 23–21.

== See also ==
- Category:People educated at Ysgol Gyfun Gŵyr
