= Lower Loughor =

Coordinates: 51.662238°N 4.077371°W

Lower Loughor Ward
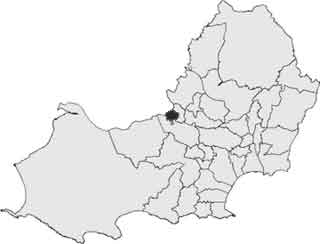
- Area: 0.94 km^{2} (0.36 sq mi)
- Population: 2,355 (2011 census)
  - Density: 2,505/km^{2} (6,490/sq mi)
- Principal area: Swansea
- Preserved county: West Glamorgan
- Country: Wales
- Sovereign state: United Kingdom
- UK Parliament: Gower
- Senedd Cymru – Welsh Parliament: Gŵyr Abertawe
- Councillors: Christine Richards (Labour)

Lower Loughor (Welsh: Casllwchwr Isaf) was an electoral ward in the City and County of Swansea, Wales. The ward covered the western part of the town of Loughor in the parliamentary constituency of Gower.

It was bounded by the wards of Gowerton to the west; the Loughor estuary to the north and Upper Loughor to the east.

Lower Loughour consists of an area of salt marsh south of the A484 road and a suburban settlement north of the A484. The settlement of Lower Loughor can be traced back to Swansea's early coal mining industry with mines, and an iron foundry dating back to the 1730s. By 1869, the St. David's tinplate works was well established across the river and the village of Loughor had grown significantly by 1876. The construction of a permanent bridge across the River Loughor in 1923, linking Swansea with Llanelli, encouraged further expansion of Loughor.

Some worker houses from the 19th Century still remain in the area close to the estuary. A substantial Post War Local Authority housing estate was developed in the 1930s. Further local authority housing was developed in the 1970s and in the early 2000s more housing has been built. About 28% of the properties in the area are detached houses with about 36% of the housing stock being semi-detached.

In the 2012 local council elections, the electorate turnout was 33%. The results were:

Candidate	Party	Votes	Status
Christine Richards	Labour	436	Labour hold
Mike Sheehan	Liberal Democrat	100	
Leigh Richards	Plaid Cymru	56	
