= Garden Village A.F.C. =

Garden Village
- Full name: Garden Village Association Football Club
- Nickname: Village
- Founded: 1922
- Ground: Stafford Common, Kingsbridge
- Capacity: 2,000 – 75 seats
- Chairman: Robert Lloyd
- Manager: Ceri Cook
- League: West Wales Premier League
- 2025–26: West Wales Premier League, 4th of 16
Home colours	Away colours

Garden Village Association Football Club is a football club, based in Swansea, South West Wales and currently playing in the West Wales Premier League. The club is affiliated to the Football Association of Wales (FAW), West Wales Football Association (WWFA), Welsh Football League and the Carmarthenshire Senior & Junior Football League.

== History ==
Garden Village A.F.C. was founded in 1922 and started playing football at Swansea League level before joining the Carmarthenshire League midway through the 20th century. After numerous league and cup successes over the years, Village gained promotion into the Welsh Football League at the end of the 1998–99 season after finishing second in the Premier Division of the Carmarthenshire League, and defeating Neath League team Cwmamman United in the Welsh League promotion play-off. In their first season of Welsh League football, the club secured promotion by finishing third in Welsh League Division Three. In the Welsh Cup Village defeated Pontyclun and Ely Rangers before being knocked out by Inter Cardiff.

In the 2000–01 season, Village finished eighth in their first season. The following season Village became Division Two Champions and were promoted to Welsh League Division One. In the 2002–03 season Village were finished 16th and were relegated.

After a number of seasons in Division Two the club regained Division One status when they finished third in season 2008–09. In 2010–11 Village were relegated back into Division Two. Season 2013–14 saw Garden Village return to the first Division after finishing third in the league, Season 2015–16 saw the management team and a number of players leave the club and Village were relegated to Division Two.

== Stadium ==
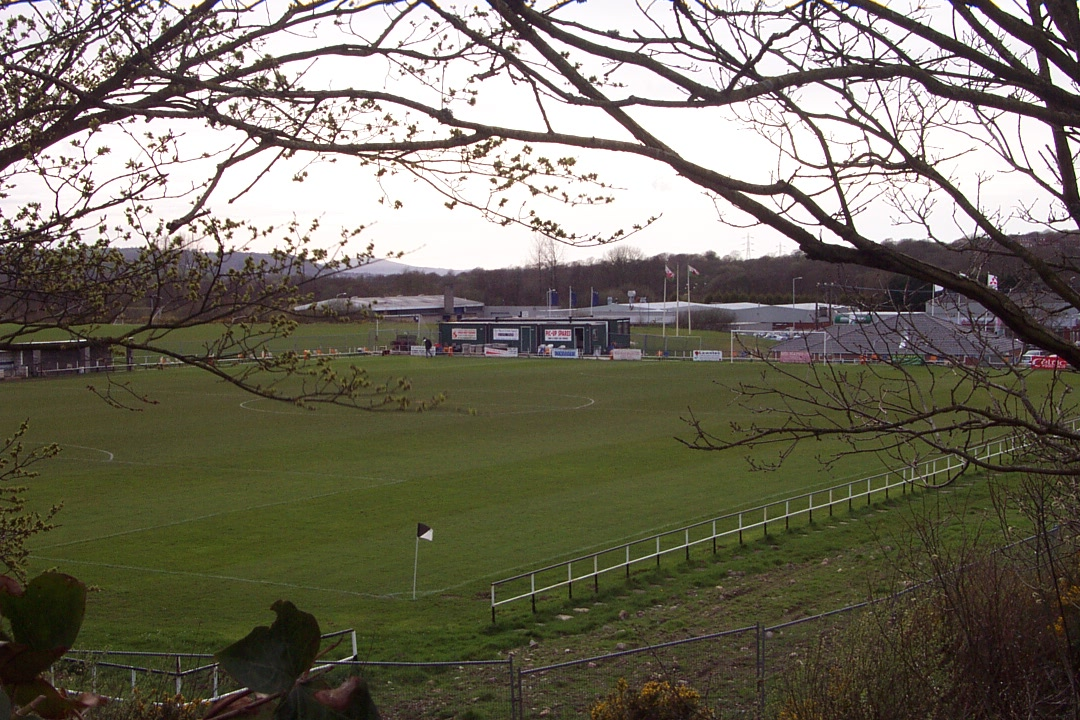
Stafford Common football ground

Garden Village play at the Stafford Common ground. In 2006 the club opened its new changing room facilities while a new bar and suite area was added to the current club house in the summer of 2008. In 2009 a 75-seater stand was installed as well as the rebuilding of the covered standing area that had been damaged previously by a storm. During the summer of 2010 the floodlights system was completed.

In the summer of 2012, the main pitch was ripped up completely to install the new drainage system. Over the years, the main pitch has had many problems with the drainage, so the decision was made to upgrade the drainage facility to help solve the problem. The work was finally completed at the end of September 2012. The summer of 2014 saw further development of the ground with a wooden perimeter fence being erected to fully enclose the main pitch area.

== Club honours ==
- West Wales Senior Cup
  - Runners-up: – 2006–07
- Ardal South Cup
  - Runners-up: – 2022–23
- Welsh Football League
  - Division Two: – Champions – 2001–02
  - Reserve Cup: – Runners-up – 2001–02
  - Reserve Division West: – Winners – 2007–08
  - Reserve Division West: – Runners-up – 2005–06
- Carmarthenshire League
  - Premier Division: Runners-up: – 1989–90, 1997–98, 1998–99
  - Division One: Champions: – 1988–89
  - Division One: Runners-up: – 1977–78
  - Division Two: Champions: – 2001–02, 2004–05
  - Division Three : Runners-up: – 1999–2000
  - Reserve Division One: Champions: – 2005–06
  - Reserve Division Two: Champions: – 1990–91, 1998–99
  - Reserve Division Three: Champions: – 1989–90, 1996–97
- Carmarthenshire Senior Cup
  - Winners: – 1989–90, 1994–95, 1995–96, 1996–97
  - Runners-up: – 1990–91, 1992–93
  - TG Davies Premier Cup
  - Runners-up: – 1998–99
  - Challenge Cup
  - Winners: – 1988–89
- Darch Reserve Cup
  - Winners: – 1993–94, 1999–2000, 2000–01
  - Runners-up: – 1981–82, 1990–91, 1991–92, 1996–97, 1997–98, 2008–09
- Krisyln Summer Cup
  - Winners: – 1978–79, 1990–91, 1992–93, 1994–95, 1997–98, 1998–99, 1999–00
  - Runners-up: – 1979–80, 1989–90, 1991–92, 2010–11, 2013–14, 2014–15
- Swansea League
  - Investiture Cup: Runners-up: – 1968–69
  - Gwalia Cup: – Runners-up: – 1938–39
- West Wales Youth
  - Youth Cup: – Winners: – 2003–04
  - Youth League Cup: – Winners: – 2014–15
  - Youth League Division A: – Winners: – 2016–17
  - Youth League Division B: Winners: – 2014–15
  - Youth League Championship Playoffs: Winners: – 2014–15, 2016–17

== Backroom staff ==
=== Club officials ===
- Chairman: Robert Lloyd
- Football vice-chairman: Alan Rushby
- Football Secretary: Craig Goodman
- Asst Football Secretary: Clive Greenfield
- Vice-Chairman: Phil James
- general secretary: Ryan Fielding
- Treasurer: Clive Williams
- Head Groundsman: Eddie Donne

=== Club management ===
- 1st Team Manager: Ceri Cook
- 1st Team Assistant Manager:
- 1st Team Coach:
- 1st Team Player/Coach:
- 2nd Team Manager: Ryan Fielding
- 2nd Team Assistant Manager: David Greenfield
- 3rd Team Manager: Lee Matthews
- 3rd Team Assistant Manager: Daniel Richards
- Under 19s Manager:
- Under 19s Assistant Manager:
- Under 19s Coach:
- Under 18s Manager:
- Under 18s Assistant Manager:
- Under 18s Coach:

== Teams ==
The club run five senior teams in:

- West Wales Premier League (First Team)
- ? (Second Team)
- Swansea Senior League Division Three (Third Team)
- Welsh League Youth Division West (U19s)
- West Wales Youth League Division B (U18s)

The club also run a number of Junior sides, including:

- Under-6s & Under-7s (Friendly Mini Football)
- Under-8s to Under-11s (Carmarthenshire Junior League Mini Football)
- Under-12s to Under-14s (Carmarthenshire Junior League)
- Under-15s & Under-16s (Carmarthenshire Junior Football League)
- Under-12 Girls (West Wales Women & Girls League)
- Under-14 Girls (West Wales Women & Girls League)

== See also ==
- Garden Village, Swansea
