= Penyrheol (Swansea electoral ward) =

Coordinates: 51.68076°N 4.05531°W

Penyrheol Ward
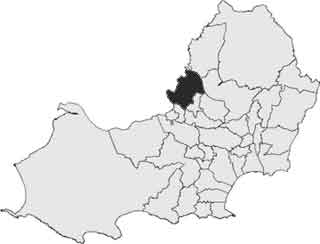
- Area: 8.61 km^{2} (3.32 sq mi)
- Population: 5,523 (2011 census)
  - Density: 641/km^{2} (1,660/sq mi)
- Principal area: Swansea
- Preserved county: West Glamorgan
- Country: Wales
- Sovereign state: United Kingdom
- UK Parliament: Gower
- Senedd Cymru – Welsh Parliament: Gŵyr Abertawe
- Councillors: David Cole (Labour); Jan Curtice (Labour)

Penyrheol is the name of an electoral ward and a suburb in the City and County of Swansea, Wales, UK.

The electoral ward consists of some or all of the following areas: Penyrheol, Grovesend and Waun Gron, in the parliamentary constituency of Gower. It is bordered by the Loughor estuary to the north west; and the wards of Pontarddulais to the north; Llangyfelach to the east; and Upper Loughor, Kingsbridge, Gorseinon and Penllergaer to the south.

For the 2008 local council elections, the turnout was 34.16%. The results were:

Candidate	Party	Votes	Status
David Cole	Labour	1036	Labour hold
Jan Curtice	Labour	904	Labour gain
Jim Dunckley	Plaid Cymru	346	
Hannah Lowe	Plaid Cymru	248	
Victor Bruno	Independent	200	

In 2012 the result was as follows:

Penyrheol 2012
Party	Candidate	Votes	%	±%
Labour	David William Cole	1,036		
Labour	Jan Curtice	904		
Plaid Cymru	Jim Dunckley	346		
Plaid Cymru	Hannah Lowe	248		
Independent	Victor Bruno	200		
Labour hold		Swing		
Labour gain from Independent		Swing		
Turnout			34.2	
