= Penllergaer =

Coordinates: 51.66990°N 4.00709°W

- Village and community
- Principal area: Swansea
- Country: Wales
- Sovereign state: United Kingdom
- Police: South Wales
- Fire: Mid and West Wales
- Ambulance: Welsh
- List of places UK Wales Swansea Map of the community

Penllergaer (Welsh: Penlle'r-gaer) is a village and community in the City and County of Swansea, Wales. It lies to the east of Gorseinon, within the electoral ward of the same name. It is situated about 4.5 miles north west of Swansea city centre, near junction 47 of the M4 motorway. The population of the community and ward was 2,868 in 2011.

== Penllergaer Woods and Penllergare ==
Penllergaer Woods, on the edge of the Parc Penllergaer housing development, once formed part of John Dillwyn Llewelyn's Penllergare estate and surrounded his mansion house. The first photographs of the Moon were taken at Dillwyn Llewelyn's observatory, which still stands.

The Penllergare Trust is a small charity that supports the upkeep of the estate. It is active in gardening, conservation and maintenance, and operates a coffee shop on the grounds.

During World War II, the estate was purchased by the missionary Rees Howells and the mansion was offered as a residence to the exiled Emperor Haile Selassie of Ethiopia.

== Education ==
Penllergaer Primary School was built in 1881. It moved to its present site on Pontardulais Road in 1976.

== Religion ==
Penllergaer has a Church in Wales church named St David's, located on Swansea Road. The vicarage is in Pontlliw.

== Services ==
Penllergaer has a regular bus service to Morriston, Swansea and Gorseinon. Penllergar also has a post office, a village shop and a park.

== Local government ==
Penllergaer is administered by the City and County of Swansea Council and an elected member for Penllergaer sits on the County Council.

Penllergaer has its own elected Community Council.

== Sport ==
Penllergaer has its own football and cricket teams. In 2025 the mens senior football team won Division 2 of the Swansea senior league. Penllergaer Juniors has both boys and girls from under 5’s to under 14’s.

== Neighbouring places ==
The nearby places are Garden Village, Gorseinon, Fforestfach, Llangyfelach, Grovesend, Pontlliw and Felindre.
