= Penyrheol, Swansea =

Coordinates: 51.678°N 4.050°W

Penyrheol (Welsh: Pen-yr-heol) is a suburban district of Swansea, Wales falling within the Penyrheol ward. Penyrheol is located about 7 miles (11 km) north west of Swansea city centre in northwest Gorseinon.

Penyrheol has two schools: a primary school and Penyrheol Comprehensive School. The latter was destroyed by arsonists in the early hours of Saturday 18 March 2006 causing 10 million pounds worth of damage. This caused much disruption to the pupils and families of the communities of Penyrheol, Gorseinon and Loughor. The destroyed teaching block was rebuilt at a cost of £9.9m and lessons began in the new block on 4 September 2009.

Penyrheol Leisure centre is the local sports facility which incorporates a swimming pool, gymnasium and theatre. The swimming pool is the home of Penyrheol Swimming Club, the only swimming club in Swansea to have achieved the Dragon Mark Award.

Penyrheol is an electoral ward of the City and County of Swansea Council.
