= Pontlliw =

Village in Swansea, Wales

Coordinates: 51°41′31.00″N 4°00′43.00″W

Pontlliw: the Lliw
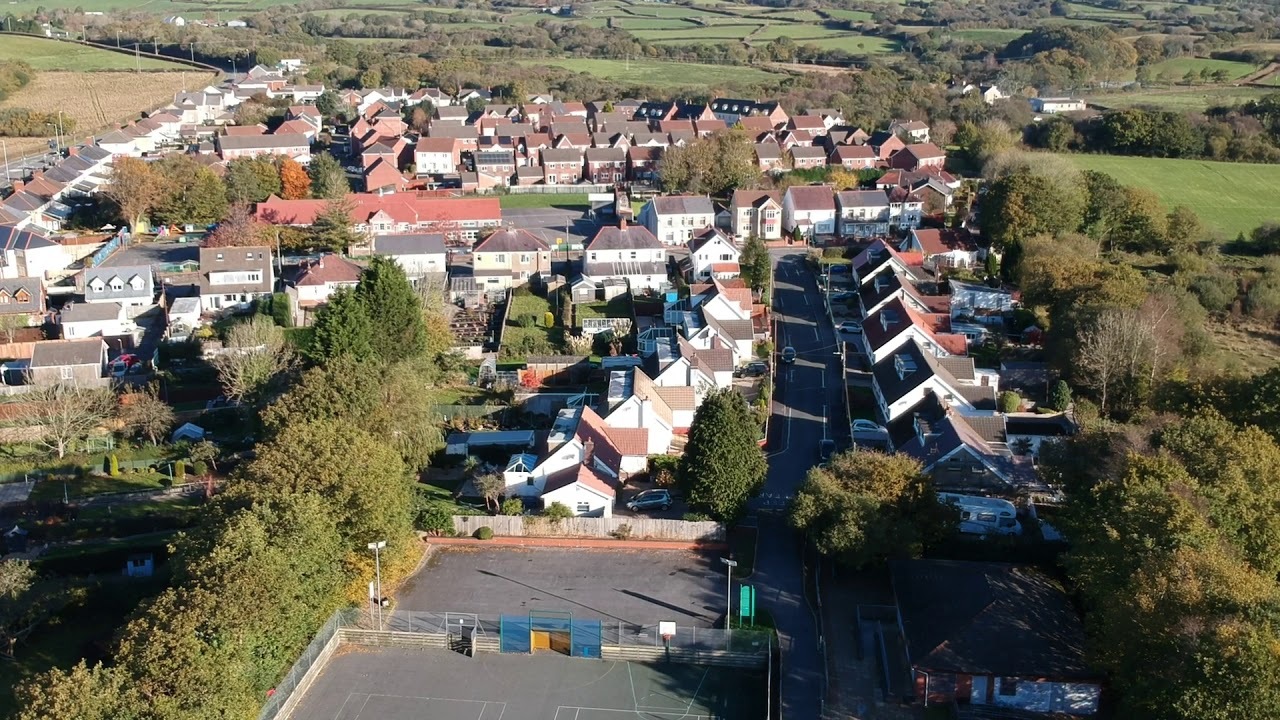

- Location within Wales
- Population: 1,645
  - Cardiff: 50.4 mi (81.1 km)
  - London: 193.1 mi (310.8 km)
- Principal area: Swansea Council
- Country: Wales
- Sovereign state: United Kingdom
- Post town: Swansea
- Postcode district: SA4
- Dialling code: 01792
- Ambulance: Welsh
- UK Parliament: Gower
- Senedd Cymru – Welsh Parliament: Gower

Current map of Pontlliw

Pontlliw (Welsh spelling: Pont-lliw) is a village in the community of Pontlliw and Tircoed, part of the City and County of Swansea in Wales. The village is located near Pontarddulais, off Junction 47 of the M4 motorway.

The name of the village comes from the Welsh word for bridge (pont) and the name of the River Lliw which runs through the village.

The Pontlliw and Tircoed community has an elected community council and has a population of 2,075. The village itself had a population of around 1,645 in 2011.

Pontlliw has a primary school, as well as a number of small businesses such as a newsagent, Post Office, a restaurant and public house – The Buck and an Indian restaurant – Rasoi.

Pontlliw has one active chapel, Carmel Baptist, which runs activities throughout the week in both Welsh and English.

The village also is home to Pontarddulais Golf Club – which lies within the boundaries of Pontlliw despite its name featuring neighbouring village Pontarddulais. The 9-hole course opened in the 1990s under the name Allt y Graban.

Pontlliw Village Hall is regularly used to stage theatrical performances and concerts as well as classes run by local groups.

== History ==
The village's roots date back to 1740 when the Lliw Forge was in operation. The forge was developed by a descendant of the Huguenots and was located to make use of the water discharged from a mill wheel. By the 19th century the village was just a mere collection of a few houses.

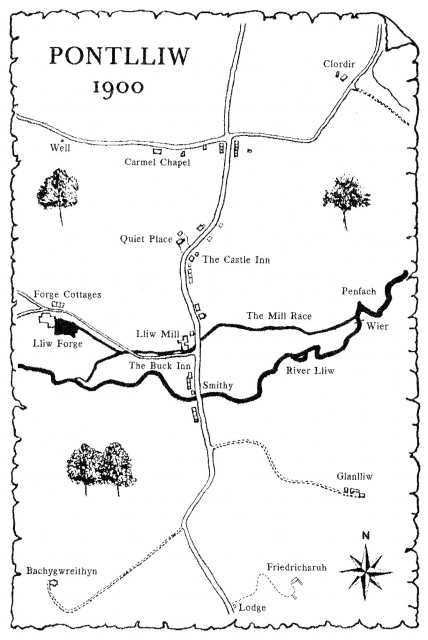
A map of Pontlliw circa 1900

In 1908, work began on the construction of a railway line through the village by The Great Western Railway Company. As a result, the population of the village began to grow and saw the building of new churches and chapels. In 1809, a mansion named the 'Friedrichsruh' was built by wealthy Austrian F.W.Dahne – the property was later renamed The Poplars.

The local school opened in 1913 and the village's further expansion the erection of The Village Hall – which opened in December 1934.

The building of more houses throughout Pontlliw saw the village grow in size and its semi-rural location combined with its good access to the M4 made it a popular place to live.

== Education ==
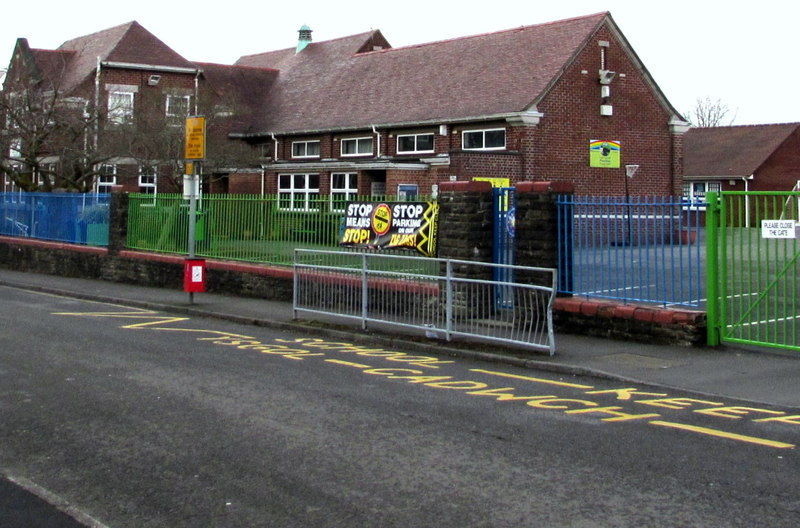
Pontlliw Primary School

Pontlliw has one school – Pontlliw Primary School, which first opened in the 1910s. There are approximately 200 pupils at the school aged 3–11. The building comprises two blocks – the older main school – and a newer bloc – where nursery, reception and infants are taught. The school's headteacher as of July 2022 is Mrs Alison Norman – who succeeded former headteacher Mr Wynford Harris in 2013. Mr Harris was the school's longest ever serving headteacher – having held the post for 25 years and 11 months. The school's mascot is a cartoon dog called SuperDog.

== Transport ==
Bus

Pontlliw is served by one bus route – the X13 Service (which runs between Swansea and Ammanford) that is operated by FirstCymru.

Rail

The village has a railway line running through it but no train station. The village's station operated briefly between 1923 and 1924.

Road

The lack of public transport means that the most common way to access the village is by car. The A48 runs through the village. And the M4 motorway – which goes from Llanedi, Carmarthenshire, in the west, to London, eastward, is 1.5 miles away.

== Sport ==
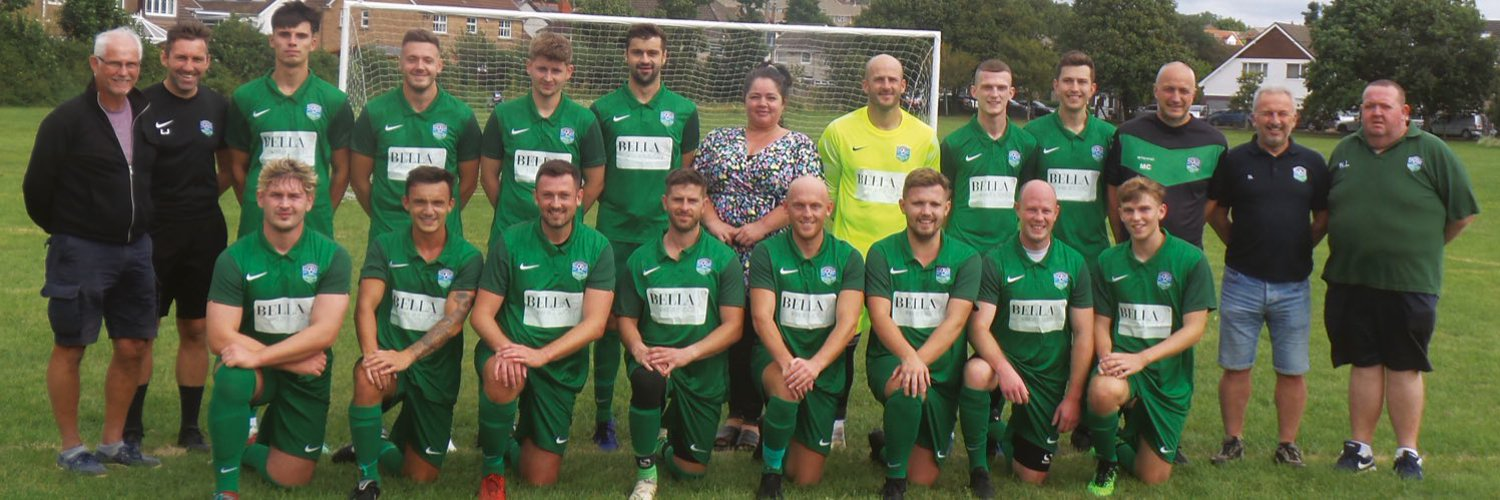
Pontlliw FC team photo 2022

The village has one sports team – Pontlliw Football Club. The team plays its home games at Pontlliw Park. Its home kit colour is green and the team plays in the Carmarthenshire League Premier Division.

Pontlliw defeated Seaside FC on 3 May 2023 to lift the TG Davies Cup for the first time. Pontlliw then claimed their first ever Premier League title on 9 May 2023 after defeating Gorseinon 6–1 at Pontlliw Park.

Pontlliw Reserve Team and Third Team also had a successful season. The Reserve Team won the Carmarthen League – Reserve Division One while the Third Team won the Carmarthen League Reserve Division Three title in their first season.

== Notable people ==
- Gareth Roberts, the former Wales rugby union player
