= Garden Village, Swansea =

Half-built Garden Village in Wales

The Gorseinon Garden Village (sometimes known as the Fforestfach Garden Village) is a half-built Garden Village that is located between Gorseinon and Fforestfach in Wales. Part of the Garden City movement in Wales at the beginning of the 20th century, like many others it is half complete, its development having been interrupted by the outbreak of World War 1.

It was designed by George Pepler and Ernest Allen, a pair of architects based in Swansea, in 1909. (Note: In the same year, Pepler and Allen had taken over the design of the Alkrington Garden Village from Thomas Adams who had taken up a position on the Local Government Board. They took over seven Garden Village projects in total, including Newton Moor, Fallings Park, and Childwall.) They displayed their architectural model at the Town Planning Exhibition at the Royal Academy in 1910. The original design was for an 8 acres (3.2 ha) site, with a possibility for future enlargement, containing 100 houses and served by a 60 feet (18 m) road. The cottages, each with a garden in front, were in varied blocks of between 2 and 6 houses per block, arranged around an open court planted with trees. They were designed with all of the main rooms under one roof, rather than having the usual back projection of the era that would have cut off light to neighbouring houses.

The Fforestfach Garden Village (Note: as it was known at the time) was originally intended to be a model village for mine workers, Fforestfach being a centre for mining at the time. It was inaugurated in 1910 by H. R. Aldridge, Secretary of the National Housing and Town Planning Council. The land was owned by the Swansea Corporation and the wardens of the Swansea Parish Church.

By 1913, progress had been made on building, with a co-partnership Housing Society in charge of operations. The planned road down the centre of the Garden Village, curved and designed so that it could be continued onwards when the Village expanded, had been built and lined with planted trees. Work on the 100 cottages, made with 18-inch (46 cm) walls out of local stone, had begun. There were spaces earmarked for allotments, a bowling-green, and a playground.

In the 21st century, a proposal was made by Persimmon Homes to build 750 homes to the north of the original Garden Village, with access off Hospital Road (51°39′54″N 4°01′22″W) rather than the Swansea Road access to the Garden Village. This faced objections over its use of a parcel of common land, containing ancient woodland, and went to a public inquiry on 2017-09-05. A revised plan of 705 homes on a 50 hectares (120 acres) site with a 3.3 hectares (8.2 acres) park was approved by Swansea City Council in 2021.

In 2024, Coastal Housing proposed building 17 homes, comprising 2 bungalows and 15 houses, next to the original Garden Village and adjacent to the Persimmon development, accessible from Swansea Road via a private road adjacent to 2B Swansea Road (51°39′29″N 4°01′23″W).

== Gallery ==
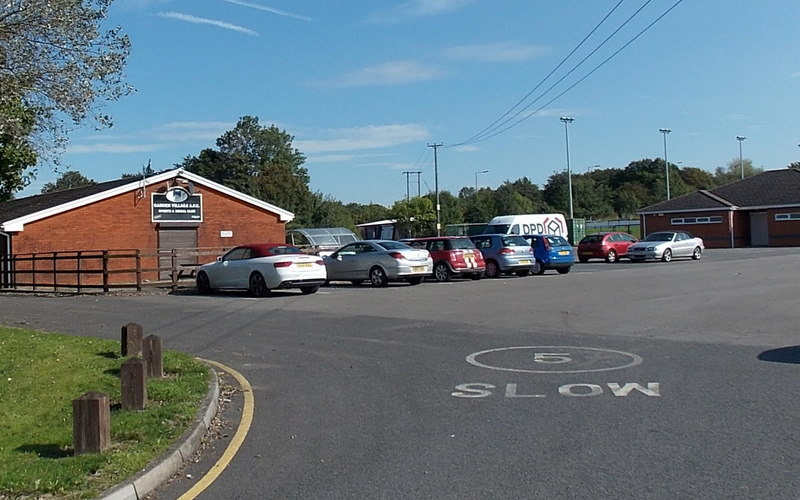
The Garden Village AFC Sports & Social Club is across the road from the Garden Village itself. (51°39.6024′N 4°2.2039′W)

So too is the Kingsbridge Cemetery. (51°39.5638′N 4°1.9419′W)
