= Gower College Swansea =

Further education college in Swansea, Wales

Coordinates: 51.6224°N 3.9838°W

- Type: Further Education College
- Principal: Mark Jones
- Location: Swansea, West Glamorgan, Wales
- Website: www.gcs.ac.uk

Gower College Swansea (Welsh: Coleg Gŵyr Abertawe) is a further education college in Swansea, Wales. It was formed in 2010 by the merger of Gorseinon College and Swansea College. Mark Jones, previously Vice Principal of Swansea College and then principal of Bridgend College, became principal in July 2013

== Campuses ==
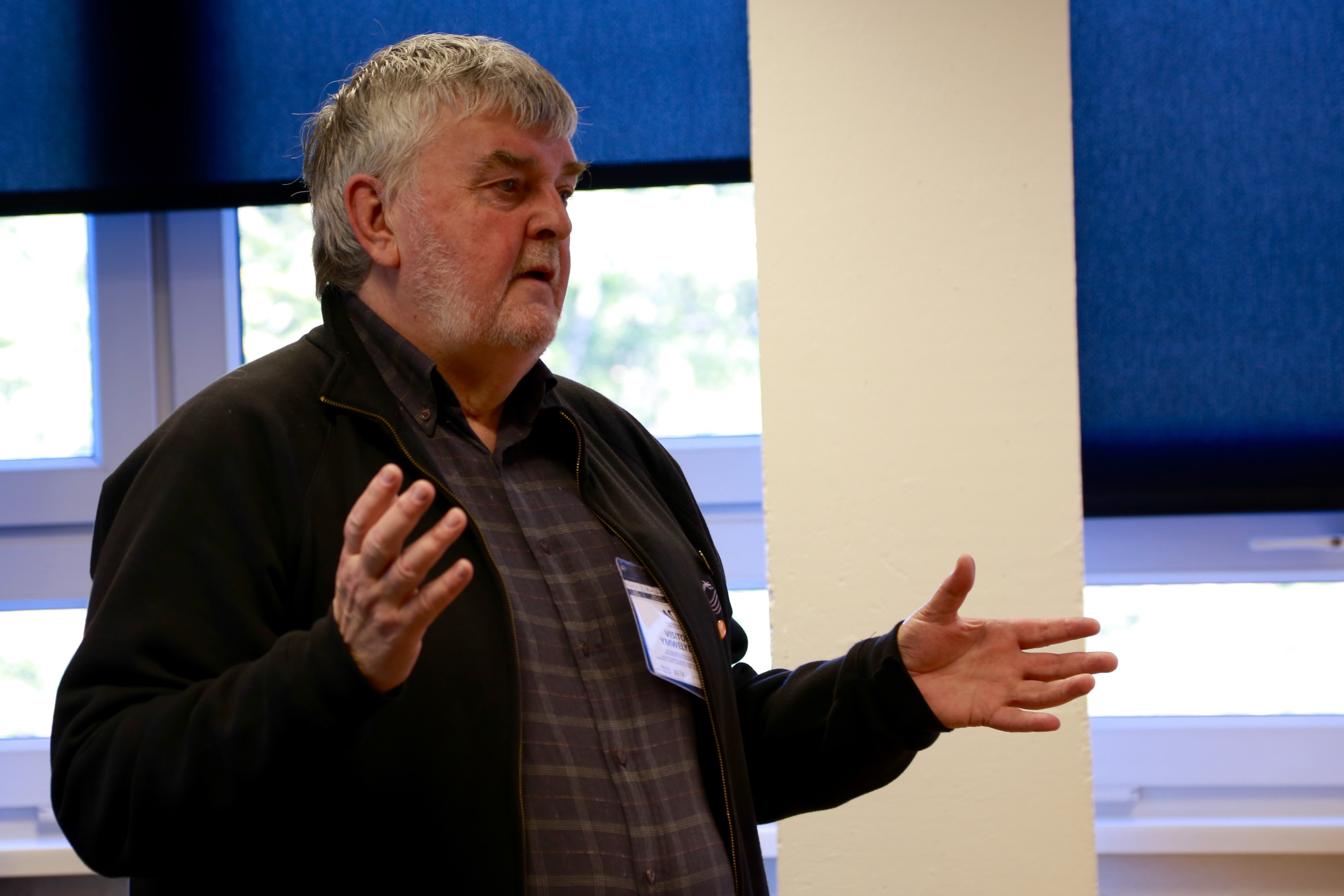
Talk at Gower College in 2015

Gower College provides further education and other training courses from several campuses and venues in the area. The college has five campuses:

- Gorseinon
- Tycoch
- Jubilee Court
- Llwyn y Bryn
- Sketty Hall

== Exam results ==
In 2021, Gower College reported that the overall A-level pass rate was 99%, above the Welsh national average. Of these passes, 43% were at the higher grades of A* to A, 70% were at A*-B, and 88% were at A*-C.

== Governance ==
The college is overseen by twenty governors who form the Corporation Board.

== Sports academies ==
The college has a number of sports academies that enable full-time students to develop skills in football, rugby, netball, hockey and cricket. Sports scholarships are available.

== Higher education courses ==
The college offers the following higher education courses:

=== Foundation Degrees ===
- Analytical and Forensic Science
- Care and Support
- Early Childhood
- IT Management for Business
- Education Learning and Development
- English and History
- Housing and Sustainable Communities
- Sports Development and Management

=== Higher National Certificates and Diplomas ===
- HNC and HND in Building Services
- HND in Business and Accountancy
- HND in Computer and Information Systems
- HNC and HND in Electrical/Electronic Engineering
- HND in Electrical Engineering
- HNC and HND in Mechanical Engineering

=== Other ===
- Professional Graduate Certificate in Education
- CertEd Post-compulsory Education and Training
- Diploma in Leadership for Children's Care, Learning and Development (Advanced Practice)

== College charity ==
The Kenya Community Education Project was set up in 2003 and is run by the college students. This project aims to raise money to maintain a feeding programme for over 120 of the poorest pupils at Madungu Primary School in Kenya. In addition, it aims to pay the salaries of two teachers and supply them with various educational materials. The college holds an annual Kenya Project Day but fundraising continues throughout the year.

Students participate in the annual Cannock Chase Walk to raise funds as well as various events throughout the year including a "Walrus Dip".

Members of the project have a chance to go to the Kenyan school every other year.

The college's Islamic Society has formed a charity for Islamic Relief, which fundraises for a week every November.

== Esports ==
Since its formation in 2019, the college’s official esports team, the GCS Owls, has become part of the college’s digital skills and student enrichment activities.

The Owls have achieved notable competitive results:

- In 2023, they finished the Winter Split of the British Esports Student Championships with an undefeated record, and also won the inaugural Williams Esports Student Racing League race in Abu Dhabi.
- In 2024, the Owls won the Welsh Cup Finals in Rocket League (5-1 over Cwm Rhymni) and Valorant (13-9 and 13-10 against Tydfil Tytans), alongside success in EAFC competitions.

The college also introduced one of Wales’s first Foundation Degrees in Esports, covering areas such as strategy, event planning, media, psychology, and wellbeing.

In the same year, GCS was recognised as British Student Champions in Esports.
