= Swansea Philharmonic Choir =

The Swansea Philharmonic Choir is a mixed choir based in Swansea, Wales. It performs with 76 members.

== History ==
The Choir was founded in 1959 by Haydn James. His stated aim was to raise the standard of choral singing in Wales, and to perform a mix of choral classics and less-familiar music. It marked its 50-year anniversary with a special slate of performances in Swansea.

== Repertoire ==
The Choir performs regularly in Brangwyn Hall and in St Mary's Church, Swansea. It presents music ranging from the Baroque Period to present-day works. It regularly includes British composers such as Ralph Vaughan Williams, Benjamin Britten and Sir Edward Elgar. It also includes works of Daniel Jones, Hoddinott, Mathias and Karl Jenkins.

In March 2007 the Choir gave a performance of Orff's Carmina Burana. Other works performed in 2007 included Fauré's Requiem, the Petite messe solennelle by Rossini and Handel's Messiah.

In March 2008 the Choir performed Mendelssohn's Hymn of Praise and the Choral Suite from The Armed Man: A mass for peace by Karl Jenkins. In June 2008 the Choir held a Come and Sing event in Swansea, at which Mozart's Coronation Mass was performed. In December 2008 the Choir performed Verdi's Requiem.

In April 2016 the Choir performed Mendelssohns Elijah

In December 2018 the Choir performed Britten's War Requiem

In April 2022 the Choir performed Karl Jenkins' The Armed Man: A mass for peace and Paul Mealors' Stabat Mater at Brangwyn Hall, Swansea.

== Commissioned works ==
In March 2007 the choir presented the world première of Cities of Dreams a work commissioned by the Choir and composed by Swansea-born composer Stephen McNeff.

In December 2019 as part of its 60th anniversary concert the Choir gave the first performance of Three Postcards by Nathan Dearden, which was commissioned by the choir, as part of Making Music UK's Adopt-a-Composer Scheme and subsequently broadcast on BBC Radio 3.
