= Swansea Life =

Swansea Life is an A4 glossy lifestyle magazine published and distributed in Swansea, Wales, by Reach plc. The magazine was acquired by South West Wales Media in 2009, who were later bought by Trinity Mirror, as Reach plc were then known. The editors have been Wyn Jenkins, Peter Slee and Laura Davies. The arts editor/ what's on editor is Mark Rees.

A sister publication to the South Wales Evening Post, Swansea Life describes itself as an "aspirational magazine highlighting the best that Swansea has to offer, from its celebrity parties to its fashion hot spots."
