= Swansea =

City and county in Wales

Swansea Abertawe (Welsh)
- City and county
- City and County of Swansea; Dinas a Sir Abertawe (Welsh)
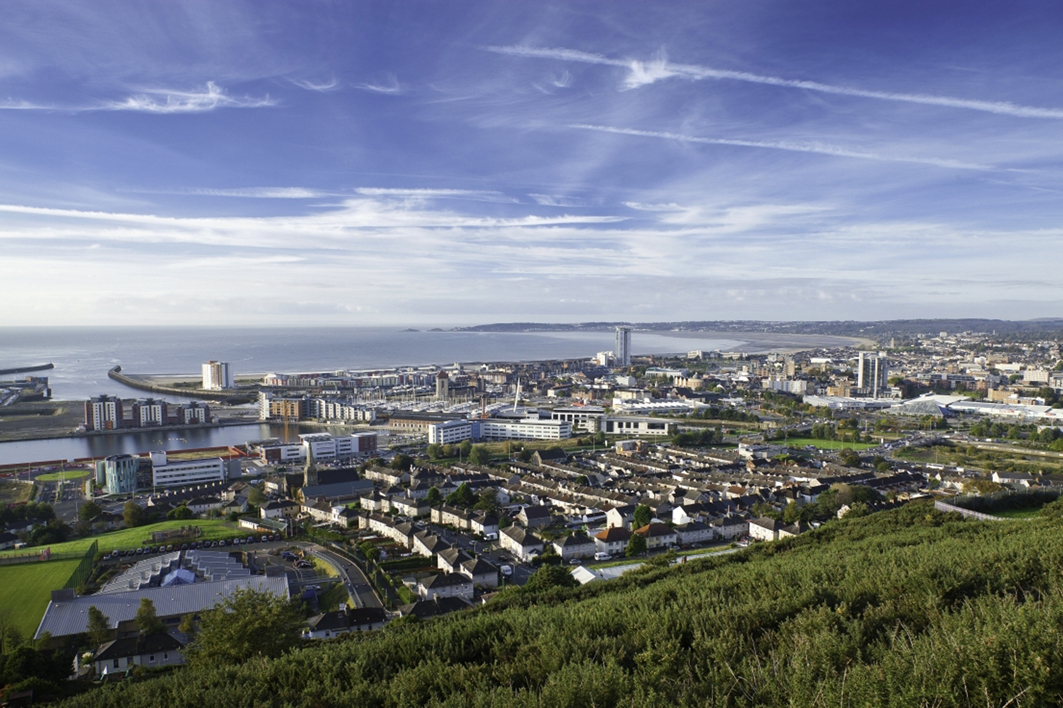
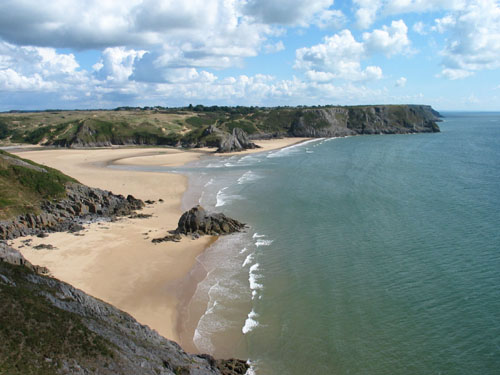
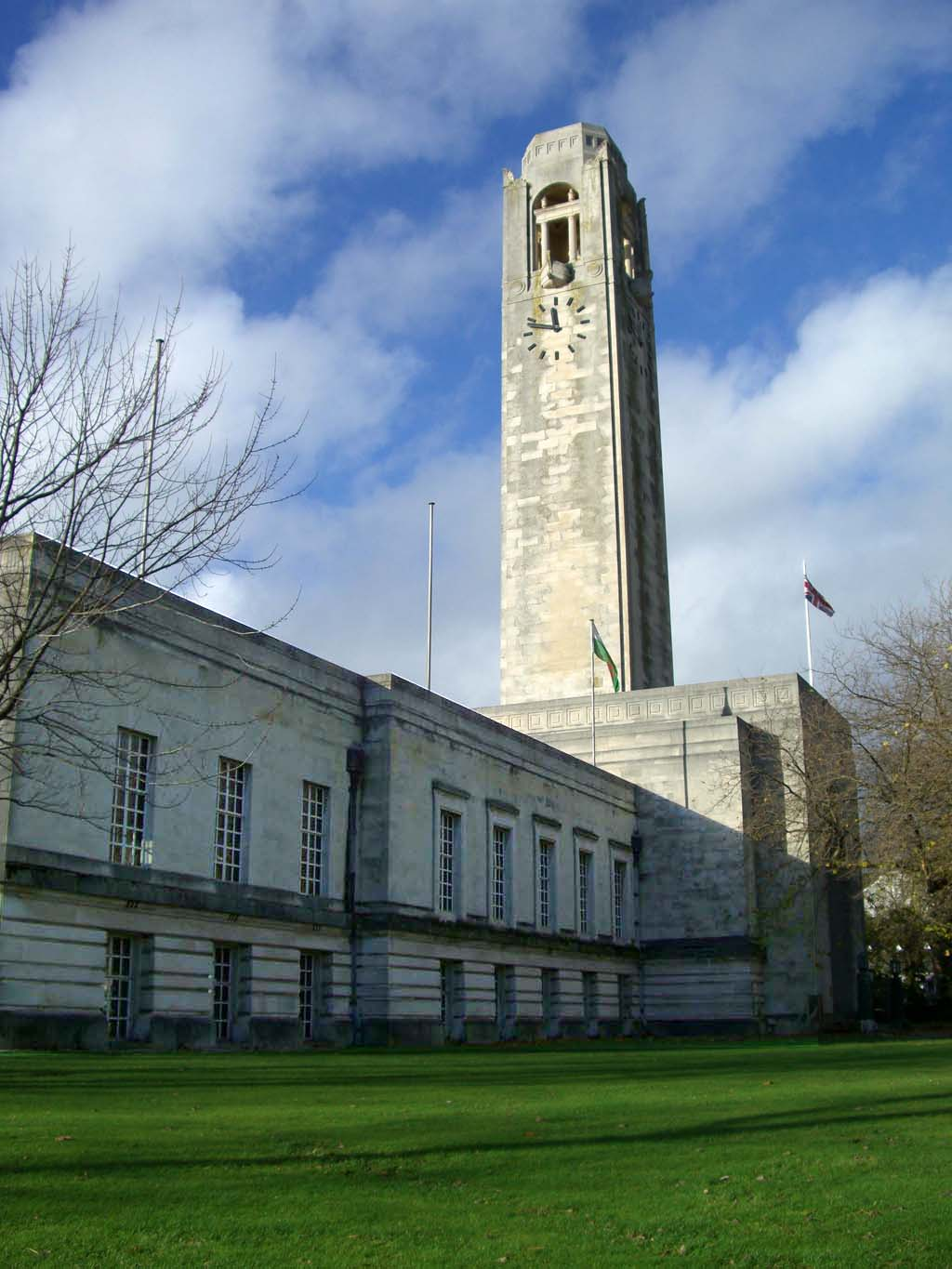
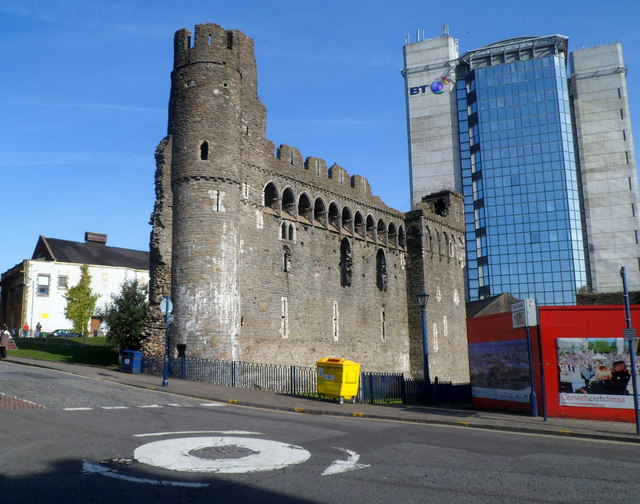
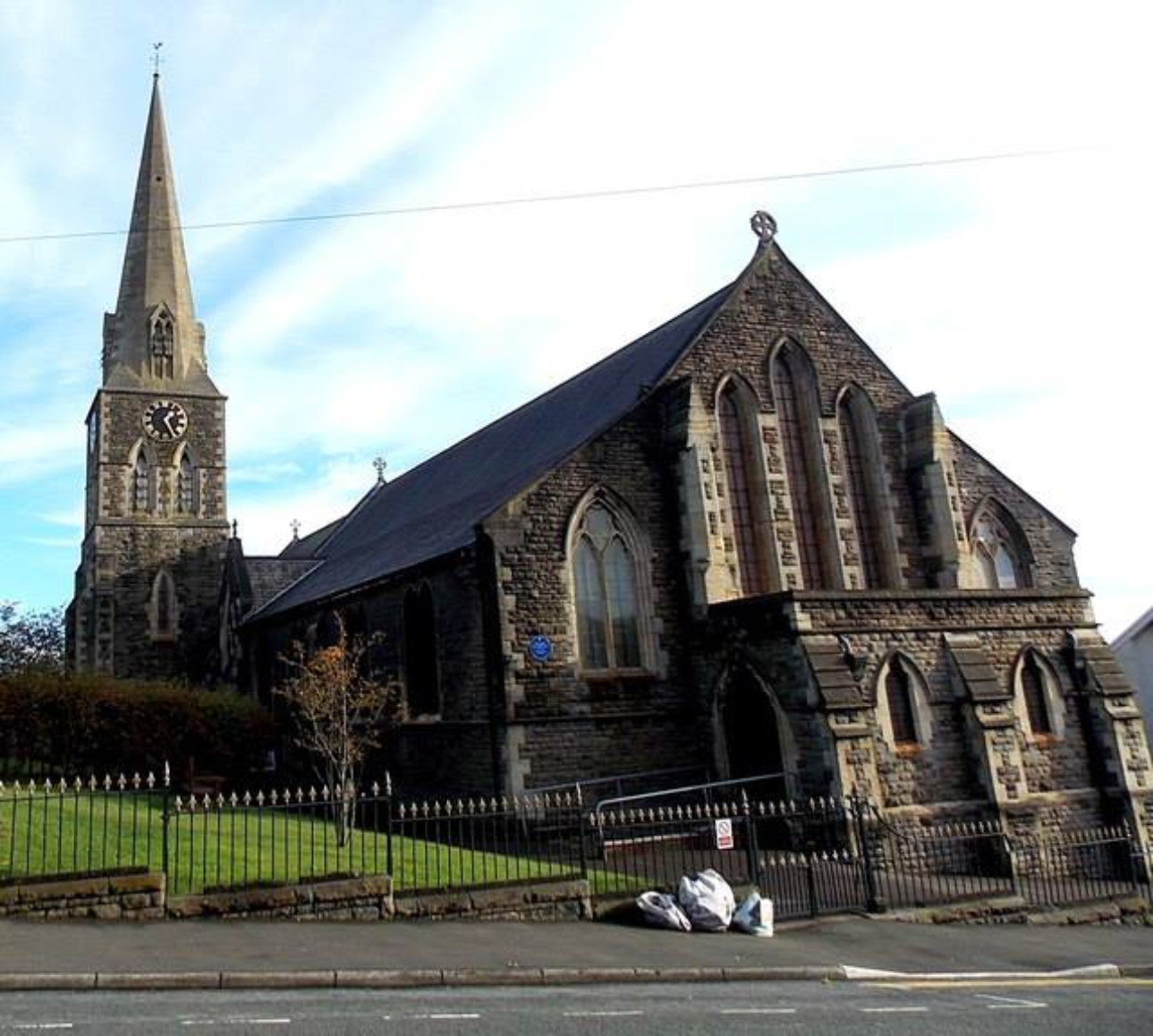
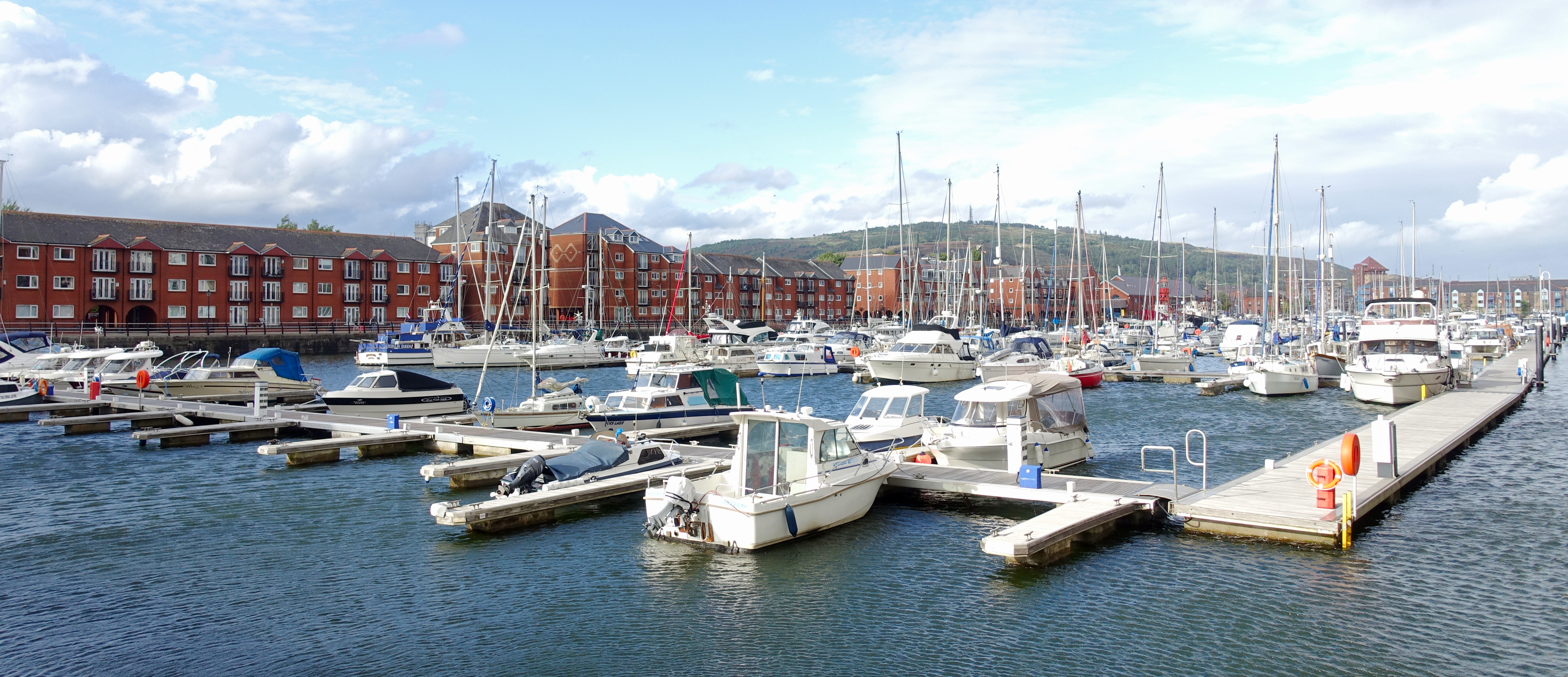
- Swansea City Centre Three Cliffs Bay Swansea Guildhall Swansea Castle ruins St Thomas Church Maritime Quarter

- Coat of arms
- Motto: Latin: Floreat Swansea, lit. 'let Swansea flourish'
- Swansea shown within Wales
- Coordinates: 51°37′N 3°57′W
- Sovereign state: United Kingdom
- Country: Wales
- Preserved county: West Glamorgan
- Town charter: 1158–1184
- City status: 1969
- Administrative HQ: Guildhall

Government
  - Type: Principal council
  - Body: Swansea Council
  - Control: Labour
  - MPs: 3 MPs: Tonia Antoniazzi (L); Carolyn Harris (L); Torsten Bell (L)
  - MSs: 12 MSs: 6 in Brycheiniog Tawe Nedd; 6 in Gŵyr Abertawe

Area
  - Total: 146 sq mi (378 km^{2})
  - Rank: 14th

Population (2025)
  - Total: 249,429
  - Rank: 2nd
  - Density: 1,710/sq mi (661/km^{2})

Ethnicity (2021)
  - Ethnic groups: List: 91.4% White; 4.4% Asian; 1.6% Mixed; 1.4% other; 1.2% Black

Religion (2021)
  - Religion: List: 47.3% no religion; 41.3% Christianity; 3.2% Islam; 0.4% Hinduism; 0.4% Buddhism; 0.1% Sikhism; 0.1% Judaism; 0.5% other; 6.7% not stated
- Time zone: UTC+0 (GMT)
  - Summer (DST): UTC+1 (BST)
- Postcode areas: SA1–9
- Dialling codes: 01792
- ISO 3166 code: GB-SWA
- GSS code: W06000011
- Website: swansea.gov.uk

Swansea (/ˈswɒnzi/ SWON-zee; Welsh: Abertawe [abɛrˈtawɛ]) is a port and coastal city in Wales. It is the second-largest city in the country. The city forms a principal area, officially known as the City and County of Swansea (Welsh: Dinas a Sir Abertawe).

The city is the twenty-eighth largest in the United Kingdom. Located along Swansea Bay in south-west Wales, with the principal area covering the Gower Peninsula, it is part of the Swansea Bay region and part of the historic county of Glamorgan and the ancient Welsh commote of Gŵyr.

The principal area is the second most populous local authority area in Wales, with an estimated population of 249,429 in 2025. At the 2021 census the population was 238,500, this was 0.2% lower than the population at the time of the 2011 census when it was 239,023. Swansea, along with Neath and Port Talbot, forms the Swansea urban area, with a population of 300,352 in 2011. It is also part of the Swansea Bay City Region.

During the 19th-century industrial heyday, Swansea was the key centre of the copper-smelting industry, earning the nickname Copperopolis.

The county also includes the outlying towns and villages of Clydach, Gorseinon, Gowerton, Loughor, Morriston, Mumbles, Pennard and Pontarddulais.

== Toponymy ==
=== Welsh names ===
The Welsh name, Abertawe, translates as "mouth or estuary of the Tawe" and was likely used as a name for the area before a settlement was established. The Welsh name Abertawe was first recorded with written records dating from 1150, under the spelling Aper Tyui.

Thomas Morgan notes that the original name of the town was Caer Wyr, meaning the "Caer" of Gower. and was the name used by the fifteenth century bard Lewis Glyn Cothi in reference to a great fortress that stood in the Swansea area, but was in ruins by his time.

=== English name ===
The name Swansea first appears as Sweynesse in the town's first Royal charter (1158–1184), with alternative versions of this name found on coins minted around 1140. First appearing as "Sweynsei" in 1188 and "Sweineshie" in 1234, with different derivations gaining favour over the centuries. In 1722, the antiquarian Thomas Hearne stated that a "King Swanus" and his entire fleet were drowned at "Swenawick, alias Swanesey" a name he derived as "the sea of Swanus". The most prevalent theory was that the name derived from "swine sea", due to the large number of porpoises in Swansea Bay.

Today the English name is believed to be Old Norse in origin, with a popular etymology stating that it derives from a Viking personal name 'Svein' or 'Sweyn', with the suffix of '-ey' ("island"), referring either to a bank of the river at its mouth or to an area of raised ground in marshland. However, the Norse termination -ey can mean "inlet", and the name may simply refer to the mouth of the river. It is also commonly stated that the eponym of the city is in fact Sweyn Forkbeard (c. 960–1014).

== History ==
=== Ancient history ===
The area around Swansea has a unique archaeological history dating back to the Palaeolithic. Finds at Long Hole Cave on the Gower Peninsula have been interpreted as those of the first modern humans in Britain, and the same area is also home to the oldest ceremonial burial in Western Europe, discovered at Paviland in 1823 and dated to 22,000 BC. The area also has many Bronze Age and Iron Age sites, such as the burial mound at Cillibion and the hill forts at Llwynheiernin and Cil Ifor. There are also the remains of a Roman villa also on the Gower peninsula.

=== Medieval Swansea ===
The area that would become Swansea was known as the Cantref Eginog in ancient times, located on the eastern edge of the cwmwd (commote) of Gwyr, the easternmost cantref of Ystrad Tywi. This area was noted for its valuable land and was highly contested by the early Welsh kingdoms. During the Viking Age, the mouth of the Tawe became a focus for trade, and a trade post may have been founded sometime between the 9th and 11th centuries.

The settlement remained under Welsh control until the Norman invasion of Wales, when Iestyn ap Gwrgant ceded the settlement as part of the new Lordship of Gower to Henry de Beaumont, 1st Earl of Warwick in the early 1100s. The Lordship included land around Swansea Bay as far as the River Tawe, the manor of Kilvey beyond the Tawe, and the peninsula itself.

In the following years, Henry built Swansea Castle c. 1106, and minted coins bearing the names Swensi, Sweni and Svenshi c. 1140. Swansea was designated chief town of the lordship and received its first borough charter sometime between 1158 and 1184 from William de Newburgh, 3rd Earl of Warwick. This charter contains the earliest reference in English to Sweynesse and gave it the status of a borough, granting the townsmen (called burgesses) certain rights to develop the area. In 1215 King John granted a second charter, in which the name appears as Sweyneshe. A town seal which is believed to date from this period names the town as Sweyse. Another charter was granted in 1304.

=== Industrial Revolution ===
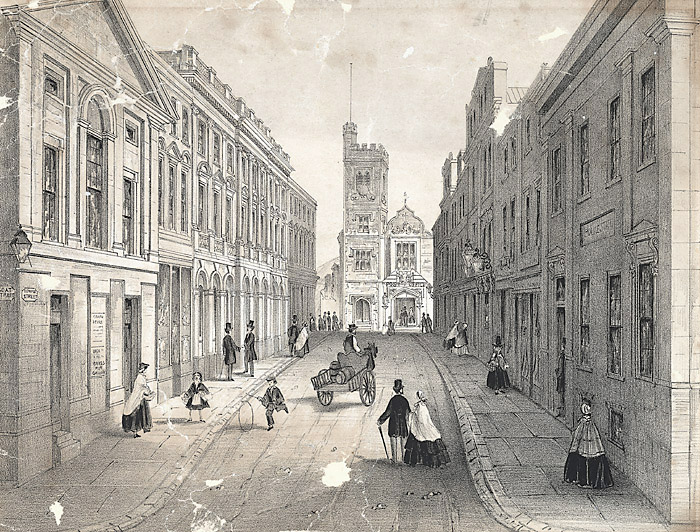
Temple street, Swansea, showing the bank, theatre and post office (1865)

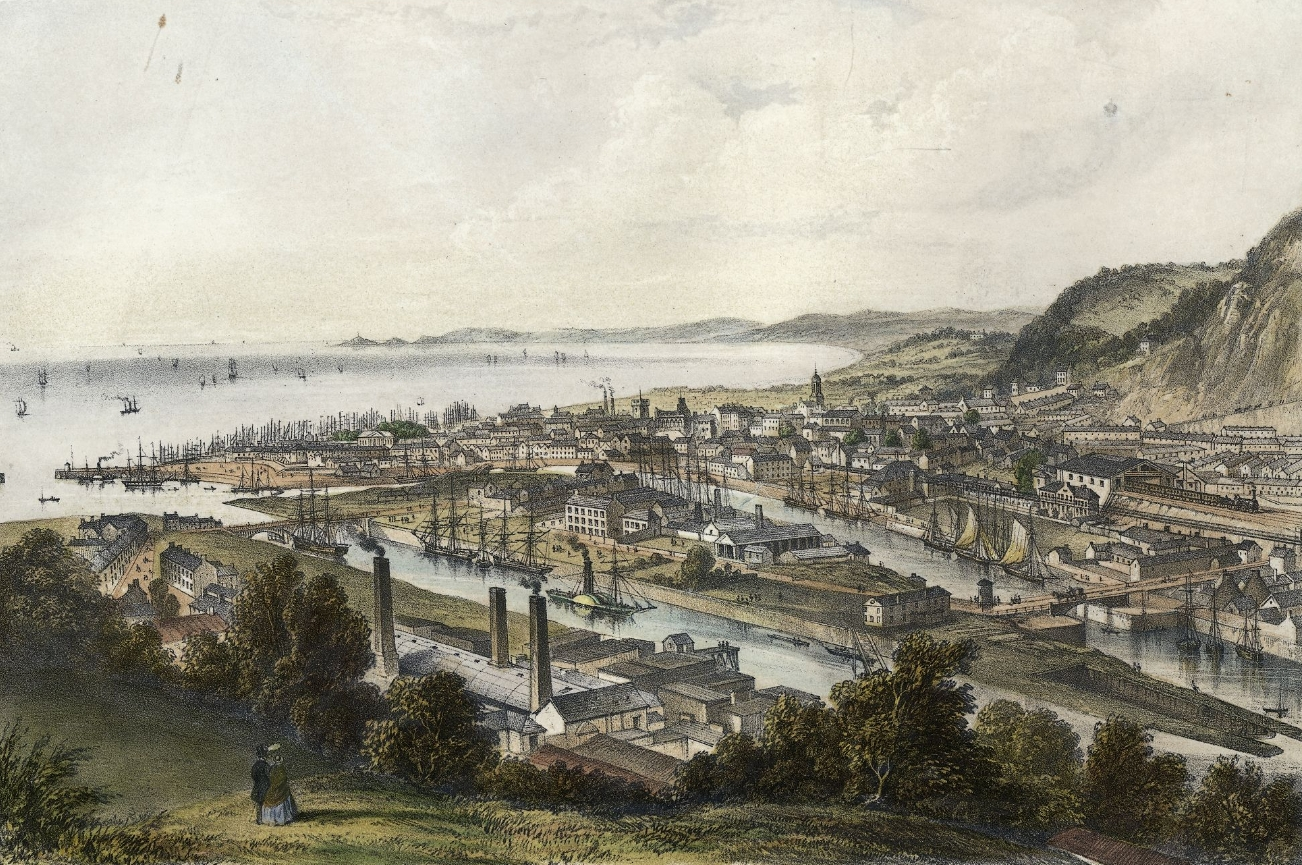
Docks and railway bridge (1850)

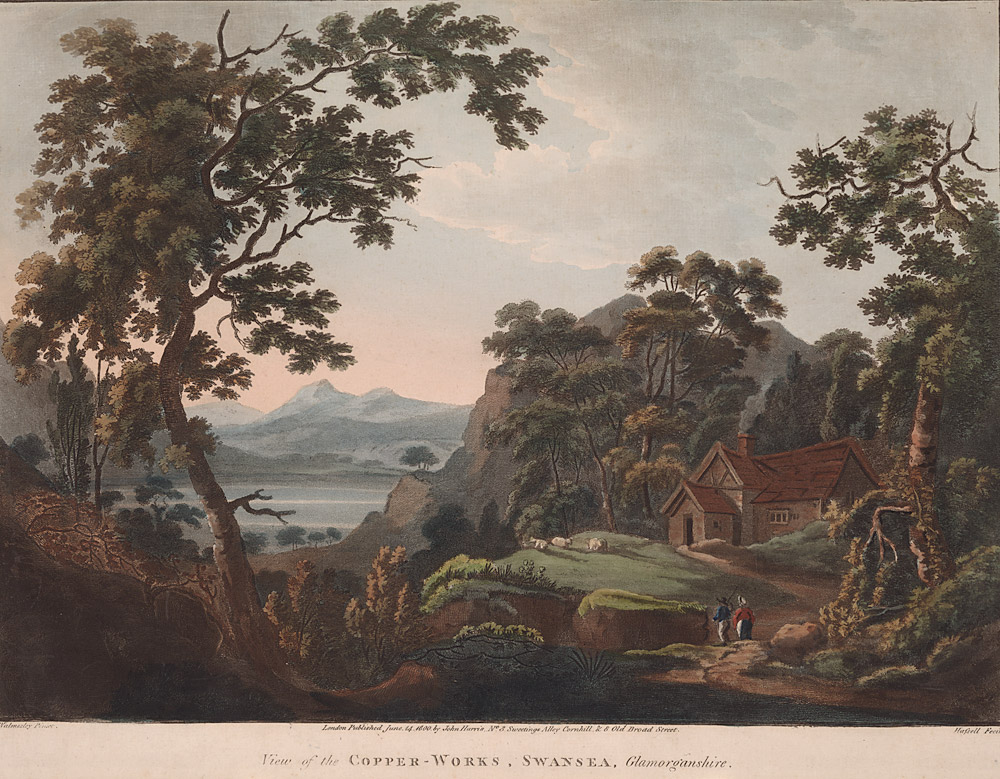
A romanticised depiction of early copper smelting works in the Lower Swansea Valley c. 1800

From the early 1700s to the late 1800s, Swansea was the world's leading copper-smelting area. Numerous smelters along the River Tawe received copper and other metal ores shipped from Cornwall and Devon, as well as from North and South America, Africa, and Australia. The industry declined severely in the late 1800s, and none of the smelters are now active.

The port of Swansea initially traded in wine, hides, wool, cloth and later in coal. After the invention of the reverbatory furnace in the late 1600s, copper smelting could use coal rather than the more expensive charcoal. At the same time, the mines of Cornwall were increasing copper production. Swansea became the ideal place to smelt the Cornish copper ores, being close to the coalfields of South Wales and having an excellent port to receive ships carrying Cornish copper ore. Because each ton of copper ore smelted used about three tons of coal, it was more economical to ship the copper ore to Wales rather than sending the coal to Cornwall.

The first copper smelter at Swansea was established in 1717, followed by many more. Once smelting was established, the smelters began receiving high-grade ore and ore concentrates from around the world. More coal mines opened to meet demand from northeast Gower to Clyne and Llangyfelach. In the 1850s Swansea had more than 600 furnaces, and a fleet of 500 oceangoing ships carrying out Welsh coal and bringing back metal ore from around the world. At that time most of the copper matte produced in the United States was sent to Swansea for refining.

Smelters also processed arsenic, zinc, tin, and other metals. Nearby factories produced tinplate and pottery. The Swansea smelters became so adept at recovering gold and silver from complex ores that in the 1800s they received ore concentrates from the United States, for example from Arizona in the 1850s, and Colorado in the 1860s.

The city expanded rapidly in the 18th and 19th centuries, and was termed "Copperopolis". From the late 17th century to 1801, Swansea's population grew by 500%—the first official census (in 1841) indicated that, with 6,099 inhabitants, Swansea had become significantly larger than Glamorgan's county town, Cardiff, and was the second most populous town in Wales behind Merthyr Tydfil (which had a population of 7,705). However, the census understated Swansea's true size, as much of the built-up area lay outside the contemporary boundaries of the borough; the total population was actually 10,117. Swansea's population was later overtaken by Merthyr in 1821 and by Cardiff in 1881, although in the latter year Swansea once again surpassed Merthyr. Much of Swansea's growth was due to migration from within and beyond Wales—in 1881 more than a third of the borough's population had been born outside Swansea and Glamorgan, and just under a quarter outside Wales.

Through its copper industry Swansea established long-range connections with Chile, where businessmen like Charles Saint Lambert imported smelting technology from Swansea and also sent Chilean copper ore concentrate to Swansea for processing. Lambert's success in modernising the Chilean copper industry during the second quarter of the nineteenth century is thought to have sowed the seeds for the later demise of the copper smelting business in Swansea.

Copper smelting at Swansea declined in the late 1800s for a number of reasons: copper mining in Cornwall declined; the price of copper dropped from £112 in 1860 to £35 in the 1890s; in the early 1900s, mining shifted to lower-grade copper deposits in North and South America, and the lower-grade ore could not support transportation to Swansea. The Swansea and Mumbles Railway was built in 1804 to move limestone from the quarries of Mumbles and coal from the Clyne valley to Swansea and to the markets beyond. It carried the world's first fare-paying rail passengers on the same day the British Parliament abolished the transportation of slaves from Africa. It later moved from horse power to steam locomotion, and finally converting to electric trams, before closing in January 1960, in favour of motor buses.

=== 20th century ===
Through the 20th century, heavy industries in the town declined, leaving the Lower Swansea Valley filled with derelict works and mounds of waste products from them. The Lower Swansea Valley Scheme (which still continues) reclaimed much of the land. The present Enterprise Zone was the result and, of the many original docks, only those outside the city continue to work as docks; North Dock is now Parc Tawe and South Dock became the Marina.

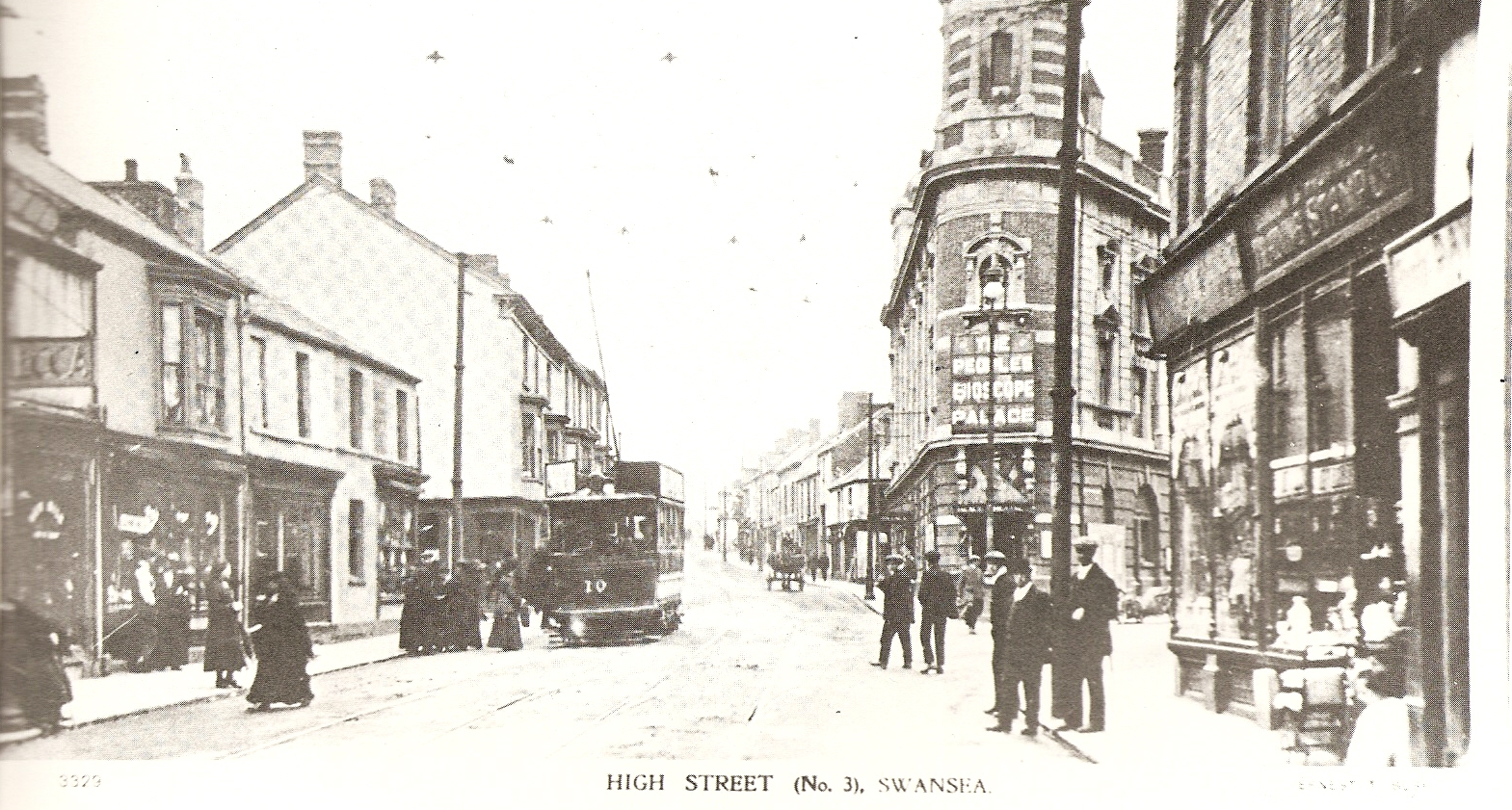
High Street (1915)

In the Second World War, Swansea's industrial importance made it a target of German bombing; much of the town centre was destroyed during the Swansea Blitz on the 19, 20 and 21 February 1941 (the Three Nights Blitz).)

In 1969, Swansea was granted city status to mark Prince Charles's investiture as the Prince of Wales. The Prince made the announcement on 3 July 1969 during a tour of Wales. Swansea obtained the further right to have a Lord Mayor in 1982.

Within the city centre are the ruins of the castle, the Marina, the Glynn Vivian Art Gallery, Swansea Museum, the Dylan Thomas Centre, the Environment Centre, and the Market, which is the largest covered market in Wales. It backs onto the Quadrant Shopping Centre, which opened in 1978, and the adjoining St David's Centre opened in 1982. Other notable modern buildings include the BT Tower (formerly the GPO tower) built around 1970, Alexandra House opened in 1976, County Hall opened in July 1982. Swansea Leisure Centre opened in 1977; it has undergone extensive refurbishment which retained elements of the original structure and re-opened in March 2008.

== Governance ==
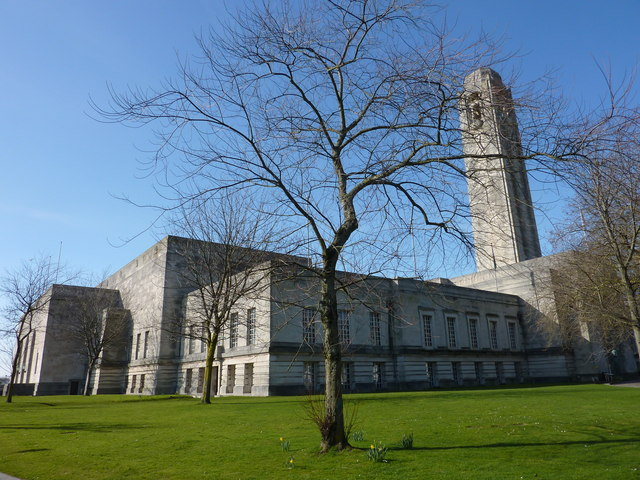
Swansea Guildhall

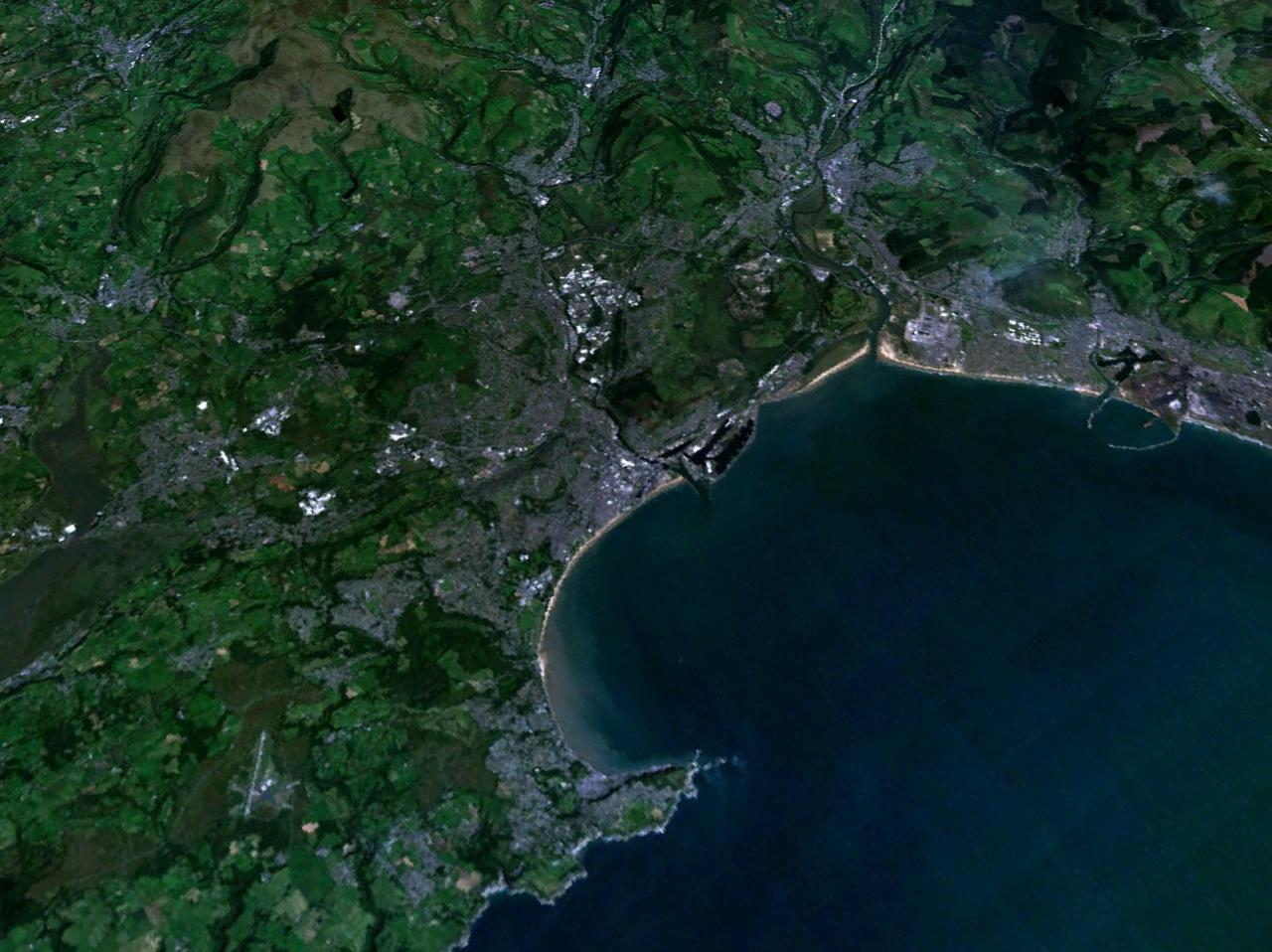
Satellite photo of Swansea

The City and County of Swansea local authority area is bordered by unitary authorities of Carmarthenshire to the north, and Neath Port Talbot to the east. The Urban Subdivision of Swansea covers all urbanised areas within the city boundary, with a population of 179,485, it is considerably smaller than the unitary authority.

The local government area is 378 square kilometres (146 sq mi) in size, about 2% of the area of Wales. It includes a large amount of open countryside and a central urban and suburban belt.

=== Local government ===
In 1887, Swansea was a township at the mouth of the river Tawe, covering 4,562 acres (1,846 hectares) in the county of Glamorgan. There were three major extensions to the boundaries of the borough: the first in 1835, when Morriston, St Thomas, Landore, St John-juxta-Swansea and part of Llansamlet parish were added; again in 1889, when areas around Cwmbwrla and Trewyddfa were included; and when the borough was enlarged in 1918 to include the whole of the ancient parish of Swansea, the southern part of Llangyfelach parish, all of Llansamlet parish, Oystermouth Urban District and Brynau parish.

In 1889, Swansea attained county borough status and it was granted city status in 1969, which was inherited by the Swansea district when it was formed by the merger of the borough and Gower Rural District in 1974. In 1996, Swansea became one of 22 unitary authorities with the addition of part of the former Lliw Valley Borough. The new authority received the name City and County of Swansea (Welsh: Dinas a Sir Abertawe).

Swansea was once a staunch stronghold of the Labour Party which, until 2004, had overall control of the council for 24 years. The Liberal Democrats were the largest group in the administration that took control of Swansea Council in the 2004 local elections until the 2012 council elections saw the council return to Labour control. For 2009/2010, the Lord Mayor of Swansea was Councillor Alan Lloyd, and in 2010/2011 Richard Lewis was the Lord Mayor. The Lord Mayor changes in May each year.

=== Senedd ===
The Senedd constituencies, since 2026, are:

The three UK Parliament constituencies covering the Swansea principal area from 2024: 1 = Gower, 2 = Swansea West and 3 = Neath and Swansea East.

- Brycheiniog Tawe Nedd
- Gŵyr Abertawe

=== UK Parliament ===
The UK Parliament constituencies covering Swansea and their MPs are:

- Gower: Tonia Antoniazzi, Labour
- Neath and Swansea East: Carolyn Harris, Labour
- Swansea West: Torsten Bell, Labour.

== Geography ==
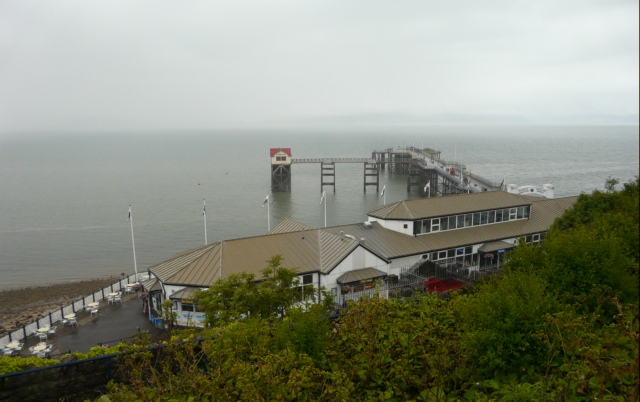
Mumbles Pier

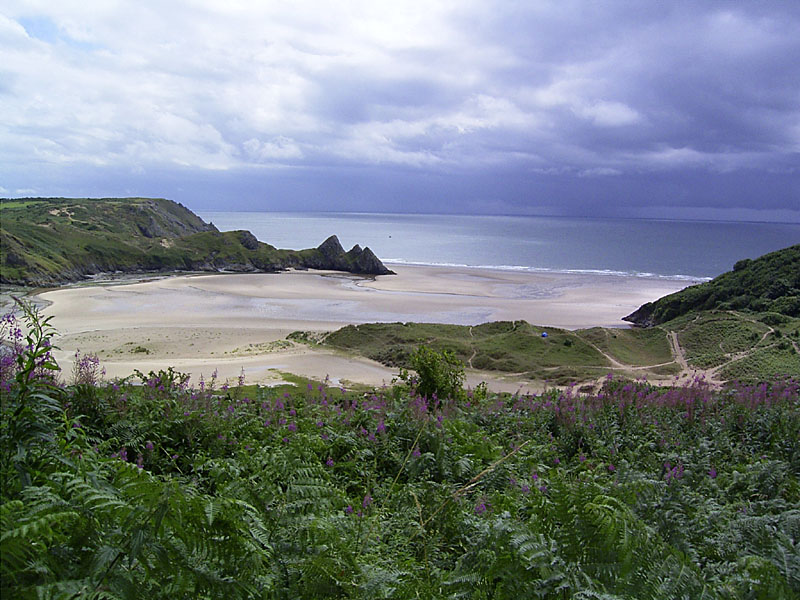
Three Cliffs Bay

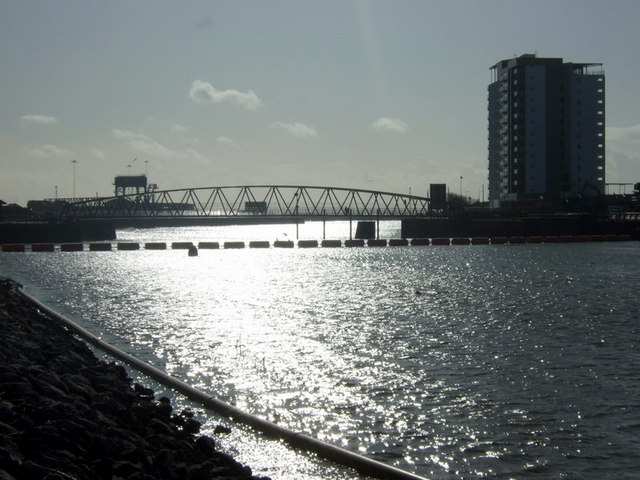
Trafalgar bridge and lock over the River Tawe

Swansea may be divided into four physical areas. The geology is complex, providing diverse scenery. The Gower Peninsula was the first area in the United Kingdom to be designated as an Area of Outstanding Natural Beauty (AONB). Apart from the southeast corner, the whole of the Gower Peninsula is within the AONB. Swansea has numerous urban and country parklands. The region has featured regularly in the Wales in Bloom awards.

To the north are the Lliw uplands which are mainly open moorland, reaching the foothills of the Black Mountain range. To the east is the coastal strip around Swansea Bay. Cutting through the middle from the south-east to the north-west is the urban and suburban zone stretching from the Swansea city centre to the towns of Gorseinon and Pontarddulais. The most populated areas of Swansea are Morriston, Sketty and the city centre. The chief urbanised area radiates from the city centre towards the north, south and west; along the coast of Swansea Bay to Mumbles; up the Swansea Valley past Landore and Morriston to Clydach; over Townhill and Mayhill to Cwmbwrla, Penlan, Treboeth and Fforestfach; through Uplands, Sketty, Killay to Dunvant; and east of the river from St. Thomas to Bonymaen, Llansamlet and Birchgrove. A second urbanised area is focused on a triangle defined by Gowerton, Gorseinon and Loughor along with the satellite communities of Penllergaer and Pontarddulais. About three-quarters of Swansea is on the coast—the Loughor Estuary, Swansea Bay and the Bristol Channel.

The geology of the Gower Peninsula ranges from Carboniferous Limestone cliffs along its southern edge from Mumbles to Worm's Head and the salt-marshes and dune systems of the Loughor estuary to the north. The eastern, southern and western coasts of the peninsula are lined with numerous sandy beaches both wide and small, separated by steep cliffs. The South Wales Coalfield reaches the coast in the Swansea area. This had a great bearing on the development of the city of Swansea and other nearby towns such as Morriston. The inland area is covered by large swathes of grassland common overlooked by sandstone heath ridges including the prominent Cefn Bryn. The traditional agricultural landscape consists of a patchwork of fields characterised by walls, stone-faced banks and hedgerows. Valleys cut through the peninsula and contain rich deciduous woodland.

Much of Swansea is hilly, with the main area of upland being located in the council ward of Mawr. Areas up to 185 metres (607 ft) in elevation range across the central section: Kilvey Hill, Townhill and Llwynmawr separate the centre of Swansea from its northern suburbs. Cefn Bryn, a ridge of high land, is the backbone of the Gower Peninsula. Rhossili Down, Hardings Down and Llanmadoc Hill are up to 193 metres (633 ft) high. The highest point is located Penlle'r Castell at 374 metres (1,227 ft) on the northern border with Carmarthenshire.

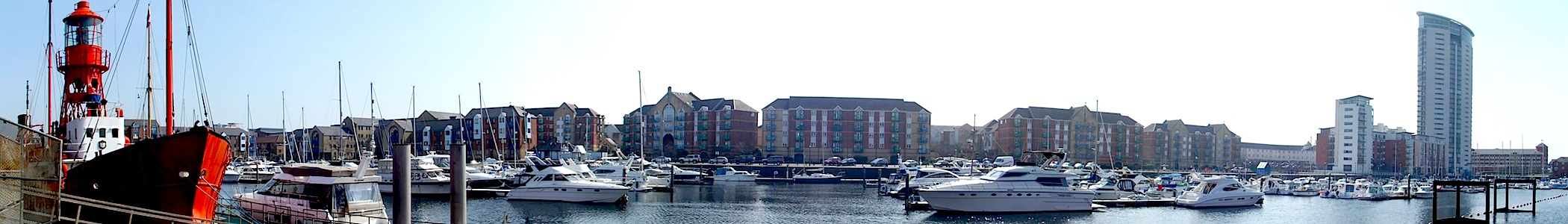
Swansea marina, Tawe basin

=== Climate ===
Swansea has a temperate oceanic climate (Cfb). As part of a coastal region, it experiences a milder climate than inland. Swansea is exposed to rain-bearing winds from the Atlantic, also cooling summer temperatures.

Climate data for Swansea/Mumbles Head (1991–2020 normals), extremes since 1973
Month	Jan	Feb	Mar	Apr	May	Jun	Jul	Aug	Sep	Oct	Nov	Dec	Year
Record high °C (°F)	13.5 (56.3)	13.7 (56.7)	19.5 (67.1)	21.8 (71.2)	24.1 (75.4)	29.0 (84.2)	29.0 (84.2)	31.2 (88.2)	25.4 (77.7)	22.4 (72.3)	16.9 (62.4)	15.0 (59.0)	31.2 (88.2)
Mean daily maximum °C (°F)	8.3 (46.9)	8.3 (46.9)	9.8 (49.6)	12.4 (54.3)	15.2 (59.4)	17.8 (64.0)	19.6 (67.3)	19.7 (67.5)	18.0 (64.4)	14.7 (58.5)	11.5 (52.7)	9.1 (48.4)	13.7 (56.7)
Daily mean °C (°F)	6.3 (43.3)	6.2 (43.2)	7.0 (44.6)	9.2 (48.6)	12.4 (54.3)	15.0 (59.0)	16.9 (62.4)	17.0 (62.6)	15.4 (59.7)	12.4 (54.3)	9.4 (48.9)	7.1 (44.8)	11.2 (52.1)
Mean daily minimum °C (°F)	4.3 (39.7)	4.1 (39.4)	5.1 (41.2)	6.9 (44.4)	9.5 (49.1)	12.2 (54.0)	14.1 (57.4)	14.2 (57.6)	12.7 (54.9)	10.1 (50.2)	7.3 (45.1)	5.1 (41.2)	8.8 (47.8)
Record low °C (°F)	−9.0 (15.8)	−6.5 (20.3)	−5.0 (23.0)	−2.0 (28.4)	0.0 (32.0)	4.0 (39.2)	8.0 (46.4)	7.3 (45.1)	5.0 (41.0)	0.4 (32.7)	−2.9 (26.8)	−5.5 (22.1)	−9.0 (15.8)
Average precipitation mm (inches)	102.5 (4.04)	73.7 (2.90)	69.9 (2.75)	59.9 (2.36)	64.5 (2.54)	68.6 (2.70)	73.6 (2.90)	87.7 (3.45)	76.4 (3.01)	112.8 (4.44)	117.9 (4.64)	114.1 (4.49)	1,021.6 (40.22)
Average precipitation days (≥ 1 mm)	15.6	12.1	12.8	10.6	10.4	10.3	10.5	12.0	11.4	14.9	16.0	15.9	152.5
Source: Met Office Infoclimat

== Demography ==
Population pyramid of the Swansea local authority

From 1804 until the 1920s, Swansea experienced continuous population growth. The 1930s and 1940s was a period of slight decline. In the 1950s and 1960s, the population grew and then fell in the 1970s. The population grew again in the 1980s only to fall again during the second half of the 1990s. In the 21st century, Swansea is experiencing a small amount of population growth; the local authority area had an estimated population of 228,100 in 2007. However, by the 2021 census, this population growth has reversed its trend very slightly with the population declining by 0.2% Around 82% of the population were born in Wales and 13% born in England; 13.4% were Welsh speakers.

The population of the Swansea built-up area within the unitary authority boundaries in 2011 was about 179,485 and the council population was 238,700. The other built-up areas within the unitary authority are centred on Gorseinon and Pontarddulais. In 2011, the Gorseinon built-up area had a population of 20,581 and the Pontarddulais built-up area had a population of 9,073.

The wider urban area, including most of Swansea Bay, has a total population of 300,352, making it the third largest urban area in Wales and the 27th largest urban area in the United Kingdom. Over 218,000 individuals are white; 1,106 are of mixed race; 2,215 are Asian – mainly Bangladeshi (1,015); 300 are black; and 1,195 belong to other ethnic groups. The Office for National Statistics 2010 mid-year population estimate for the City & County of Swansea is 232,500.

=== Religion ===
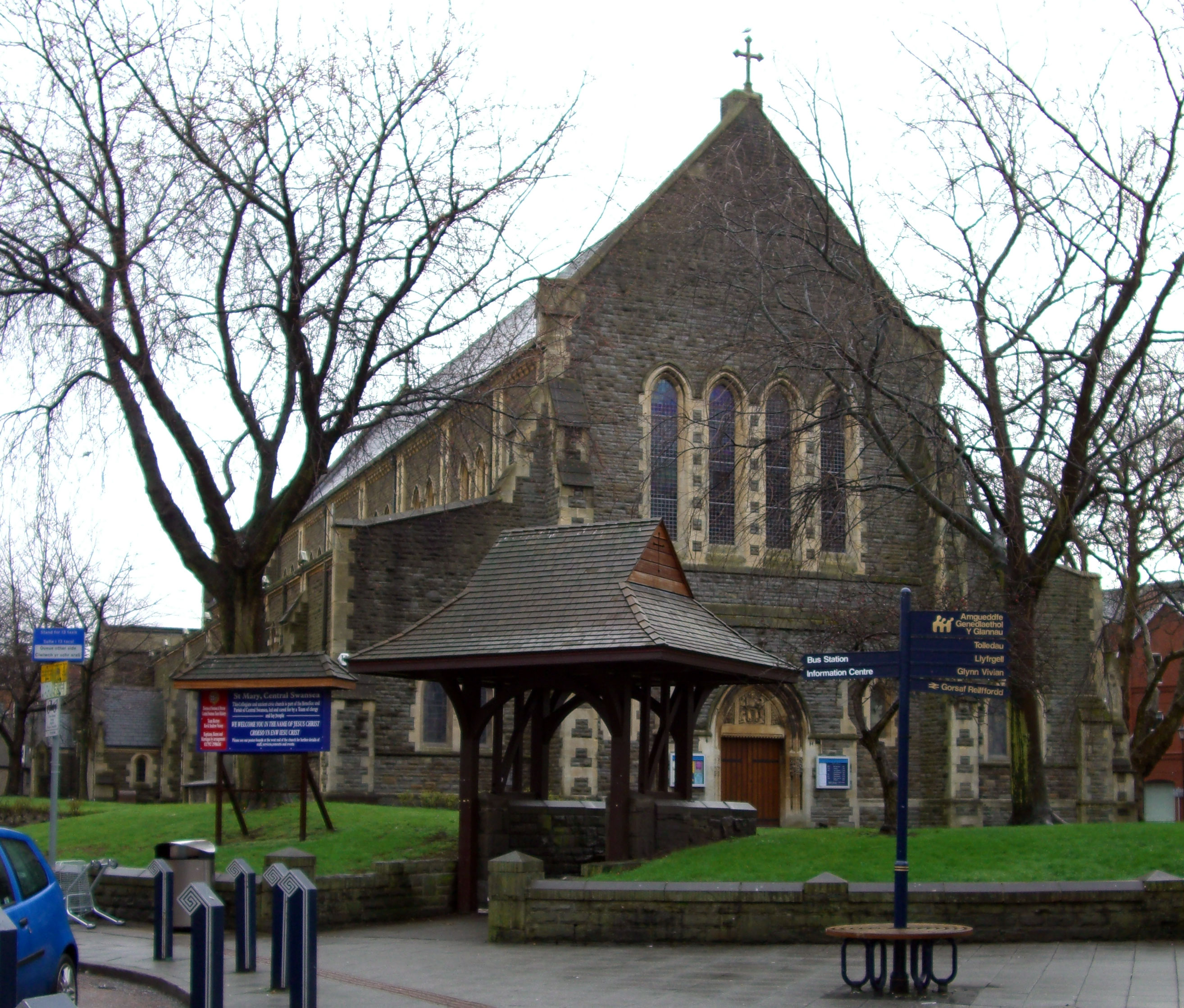
St. Mary's Church in St. Mary's Square

In 2001, 158,457 people in the local authority area (71 per cent) stated their religion to be Christian, 44,286 (20 per cent) no religion, 16,800 (7.5 per cent) did not state a religion and 2,167 were Muslim There are small communities of other religions, each making up a little under 1 per cent of the total population. Since 2001, there has been a significant shift in religious affiliation. According to the 2021 census, the proportion of Christians has declined to 41 per cent, while nearly half of residents (47 per cent) report no religious affiliation.

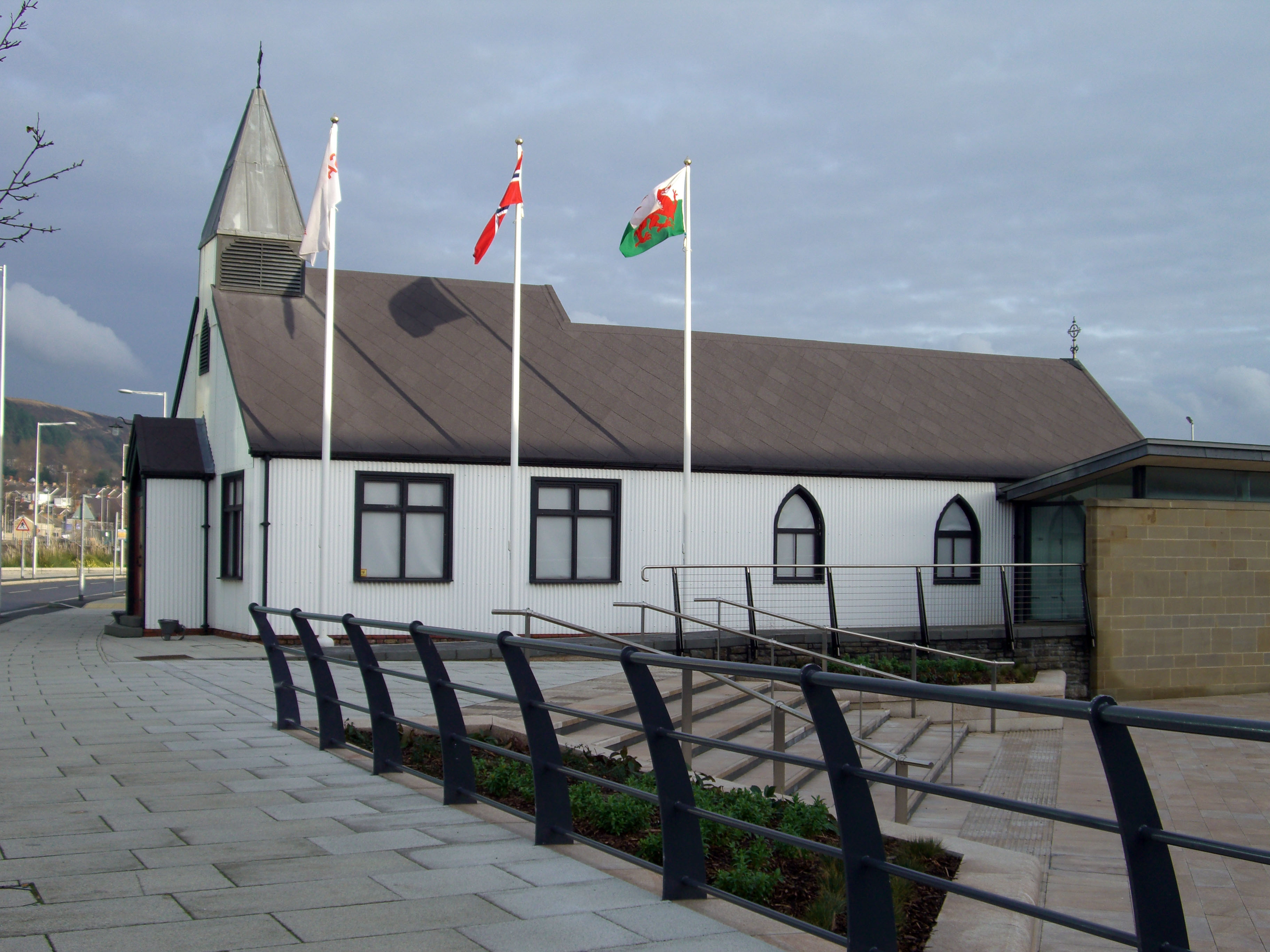
Swansea Norwegian Church

Swansea is part of the Anglican Diocese of Swansea and Brecon and the Roman Catholic Diocese of Menevia. The Catholic see is based in Swansea at St Joseph's Cathedral in the Greenhill area and the oldest Catholic church in the city is St David's Priory Church, built in 1847.

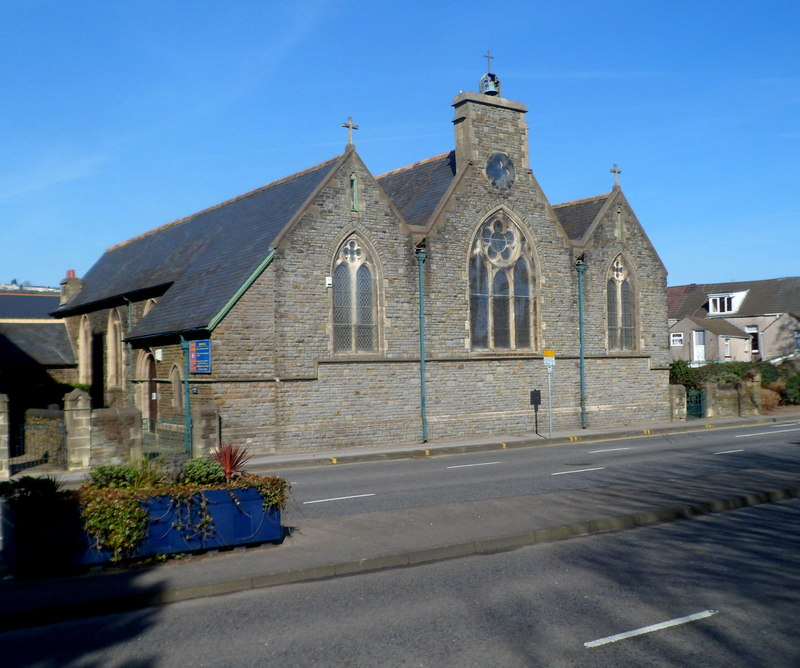
Christ Church (Church in Wales)

Swansea, like Wales in general, has seen many Non-conformist religious revivals. In 1904, Evan Roberts, a miner from Loughor (Llwchwr), just outside Swansea, was the leader of what has been called one of the world's greatest Protestant religious revivals. Within a few months, about 100,000 people were converted. This revival in particular had a profound effect on Welsh society. Swansea is covered by the Swansea and Gower Methodist Circuit.

The Ebenezer Baptist Church dates from November 1875 when the foundation stone was laid for Tabernacle chapel in Skinner Street. The first pastor, the Rev. J. D. Jones, was called in February 1876 and the new building was opened in July that year. The church was served by a number of ministers until 1911 when the Rev. R. J. Willoughby came to the church. The church has an organ by Harrison & Harrison.

The Norwegian Church is a Grade II listed building in the docklands area of the city. The church building was originally located at Newport Docks. The building consists of a Seaman's Mission to the west end and a single gothic church to the east end. It was originally built as a place of worship for Norwegian sailors when they visited the UK. It was relocated to Swansea in 1910 at a site directly opposite the Sainsbury's supermarket on the River Tawe.

The city is home to 10% of the total Welsh Muslim population; Swansea's Muslim community is raising money to open a new central mosque and community centre in the former St. Andrew's United Reformed Church. This would replace the existing central Mosque on St Helens Road and be in addition to the other three existing mosques (Swansea University Mosque, Hafod Mosque, Imam Khoei Mosque).

Swansea is represented in Buddhism with the Dharmavajra Kadampa Buddhist Centre, Pulpung Changchub Dargyeling (Kagyu Tradition) and a branch of the international Dzogchen Community (Nyingma Tradition). Swansea Synagogue and Jehovah's Witness Kingdom Hall are both located in the Uplands area. Around 160 people in Swansea indicated they were Jewish in the 2011 census.

The following table shows the religious identity of residents residing in Swansea according to the 2001, 2011 and the 2021 censuses:

Religion	2001		2011		2021	
Religion	Number	%	Number	%	Number	%
No religion	44,286	19.8	81,219	34.4	112,687	47.3
Christian	158,457	71.0	131,451	51.0	98,492	41.3
Religion not stated	16,800	7.5	17,823	7.5	15,985	6.7
Muslim	2,167	1.0	5,415	2.3	7,694	3.2
Other religion	447	0.2	1,042	0.4	1,175	0.5
Hindu	282	0.1	780	0.3	1,010	0.4
Buddhism	539	0.2	856	0.4	942	0.4
Sikh	153	0.1	278	0.1	346	0.1
Jewish	170	0.1	159	0.1	159	0.1
Total	223,301	100.00%	239,023	100.00%	238,491	100.0%

=== Ethnicity ===
Ethnic Group	Year (local authority boundaries)							
Ethnic Group	1991		2001		2011		2021	
Ethnic Group	Number	%	Number	%	Number	%	Number	%
White: Total	178,639	98.2%	218,495	97.8%	224,697	94%	218,052	91.4%
White: British	–	–	213,736	95.7%	218,655	91.4%	208,703	87.5%
White: Irish	–	–	1,290		1,101		1,111	0.5%
White: Gypsy or Irish Traveller	–	–	–	–	85		93	0.0%
White: Roma							117	0.0%
White: Other	–	–	3,469		4,856		8,028	3.4%
Asian or Asian British: Total	2,232	1.2%	2,840	1.3%	7,803	3.2%	10,451	4.4%
Asian or Asian British: Indian	409		544		1,477		2,172	0.9%
Asian or Asian British: Pakistani	168		322		591		954	0.4%
Asian or Asian British: Bangladeshi	762		1,015		1,944		2,865	1.2%
Asian or Asian British: Chinese	471		625		2,052		1,932	0.8%
Asian or Asian British: Other Asian	422		334		1,739		2,528	1.1%
Black or Black British: Total	328	0.2%	290	0.1%	1,983	0.8%	2,797	1.1%
Black or Black British: African	125		192		1,707		2,227	0.9%
Black or Black British: Caribbean	77		77		172		235	0.1%
Black or Black British: Other Black	126		21		104		335	0.1%
Mixed or British Mixed: Total	–	–	1,106	0.5%	2,160	0.9%	3,808	1.6%
Mixed: White and Black Caribbean	–	–	238		548		669	0.3%
Mixed: White and Black African	–	–	101		280		674	0.3%
Mixed: White and Asian	–	–	427		781		1,285	0.5%
Mixed: Other Mixed	–	–	340		551		1,180	0.5%
Other: Total	707	0.4%	570	0.3%	2,380	1%	3,383	1.5%
Other: Arab	–	–	–	–	1,694		1,578	0.7%
Other: Any other ethnic group	707	0.4%	570	0.3%	686		1,805	0.8%
Total	181,906	100%	223,301	100%	239,023	100%	238,491	100%

== Transport ==
=== Road ===
The M4 motorway, with junctions 44 to 47, bypasses Swansea, replacing the A48 as the main east–west route. Both the M4 and the A48 connect with Neath, Port Talbot and Cardiff to the east and Carmarthen to the west. The A483 dual carriageway links the city centre with the motorway at junction 42 to the east and junction 47 to the north-west.

On departing Swansea to the north, the A483 multiplexes with the A48 before continuing through mid Wales and terminating at Chester. The A4067 connecting Mumbles with the city centre and continuing up the Swansea Valley towards Brecon is also a dual carriageway for much of its route through Swansea. Other notable local roads include the A484, which provides a link from Fforestfach west to Llanelli, and the A4118, the main route westwards from the city centre across Gower to Port Eynon.

=== Railway ===
Swansea railway station (formerly Swansea High Street) is served by two train operating companies:

- Transport for Wales operates services to Llanelli, Carmarthen, Haverfordwest, Milford Haven, Tenby, Pembroke Dock and Fishguard Harbour (connecting with the Stena Line to Rosslare Europort and Irish Rail to Dublin Connolly). There are also suburban services to Gowerton, Llansamlet and Pontarddulais. Inter-city services connect the city with Hereford, Shrewsbury, Crewe and Manchester Piccadilly.
- Great Western Railway operates inter-city services to Carmarthen, Neath, Port Talbot, Bridgend, Cardiff Central, Newport, Bristol Parkway, Swindon, Reading and London Paddington. They also operate 5 tpd (trains per day) to Didcot Parkway.

Preceding station	National Rail	Following station
Terminus	Transport for Wales; Swanline	Llansamlet
Gowerton	Transport for Wales; South Wales Main Line	Neath
Llanelli	Great Western Railway; Carmarthen - London Paddington	Neath

Until the 1960s, there were further railway stations on the following railway lines, which are now closed:

- Llanelly Railway: Swansea Bay, Swansea Victoria, Swansea Wind Street
- Vale of Neath Railway: Swansea East Dock, Swansea Wind Street, Swansea Victoria, Swansea Bay
- Swansea and Mumbles Railway: Rutland Street, St. Helen's Road, St. Gabriel's, Brynmill, Blackpill
- Swansea Vale Railway: Glais, Upper Bank, Swansea St Thomas
- Rhondda and Swansea Bay Railway: Swansea Riverside

=== Buses and coaches ===
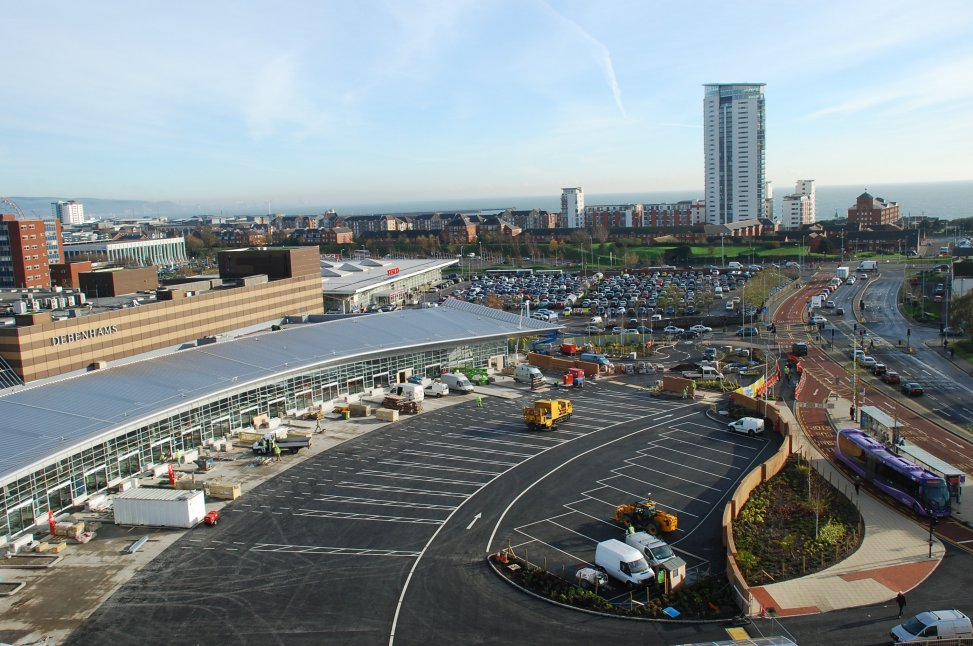
Swansea bus station

Bus routes in the area are operated predominantly by First Cymru, with smaller operators such as Adventure Travel, South Wales Transport and DANSA also operate some routes in the city, most of which serve Swansea bus station.

Local bus routes run throughout the city, including to Morriston Hospital, Singleton Hospital and Swansea University. Regional routes connect the area with Brecon, Bridgend, Mumbles and Cardiff.

Coach services include:

- National Express operates services to Heathrow Airport, Gatwick Airport, London, Birmingham, Cardiff, Bristol, Llanelli, Carmarthen and Haverfordwest
- FlixBus operates to Cardiff, Newport, Bristol, Heathrow Airport and London.

From 1878 to 1937 a network of eight permanent and two occasional tramway routes was operated in Swansea by the Swansea Improvements and Tramway Company.

==== Park and ride ====
Park and ride services are operated from car parks at Landore and Fabian Way. During busy periods of the year, additional services are operated from the Brynmill recreation ground. Subsidised services to Fforestfach were cut in 2015 due to local authority financial constraints.

=== Air ===
Swansea Airport is a minor aerodrome situated in the Gower providing recreational flights only. Further development of the airport is strongly resisted by the local communities and environmental groups.

Cardiff Airport, 44 miles (71 km) to the east in the Vale of Glamorgan, provides scheduled domestic and international flights. It is approximately 40 minutes away by road or 70 minutes by rail.

Pembrey Airport, 17 miles (27 km) to the west, is available for private flights.

=== Sea ===
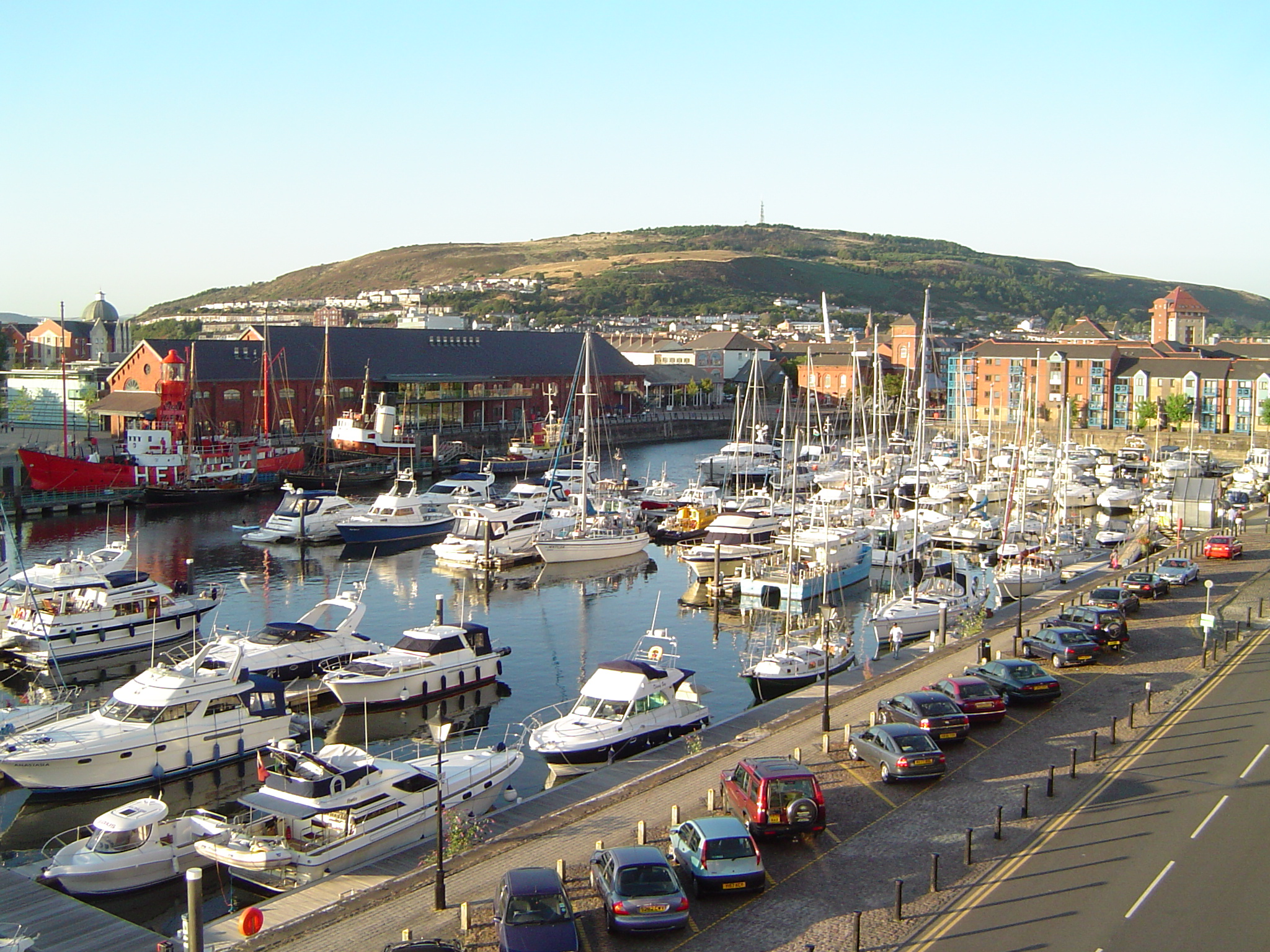
South Dock at Swansea Marina

Swansea Marina to the south of the city centre has berths for 410 leisure boats. An addition 200 berths for leisure boats are located near the mouth of the River Tawe. Further leisure boating berths are being constructed at the Prince of Wales Dock in the Swansea Docks complex. The Swansea Docks complex is owned and operated by Associated British Ports and is used to handle a range of cargo ranging from agribulks and coal to timber and steel. Swansea Docks consists of three floating docks and a ferry terminal.

Fastnet Line operated a Swansea Cork Ferry roll-on/roll-off service until November 2011, when the service was ended. A proposal for a catamaran-based passenger ferry service from Ilfracombe to Swansea, scheduled to begin in time for Easter in 2010, has yet to launch. It would have had two return trips a day taking around 50 minutes each way and carried cycles.

=== Cycling ===
There are four dedicated cycle routes in the local authority's area:

- Swansea Bay: The Maritime Quarter to the Knab Rock near the Mumbles Pier.
- Clyne Valley Country Park: Blackpill to Gowerton forming part of National Cycle Network (NCN) Route 4.
- Along the east bank of the River Tawe forming the start of NCN, Route 43, which terminates at Abercraf. Sustrans advise that it will continue northwards to Builth Wells once complete.
- Adjacent to the Fabian Way: Forming part of NCN Route 4 and extending as the Celtic Trail to Chepstow and London.

City cruiser pedal vehicles are being introduced to the city centre in a joint venture between the council and Swansea Business Improvement District.

In November 2007, a new bridge was completed over the Fabian Way which provides a one way park and ride bus lane and a shared-use pedestrian and NCN route 4 cycleway. The leaf-shaped bridge was shortlisted for the 2008 British Constructional Steelwork Association Structural Steel Design Awards.

== Culture ==
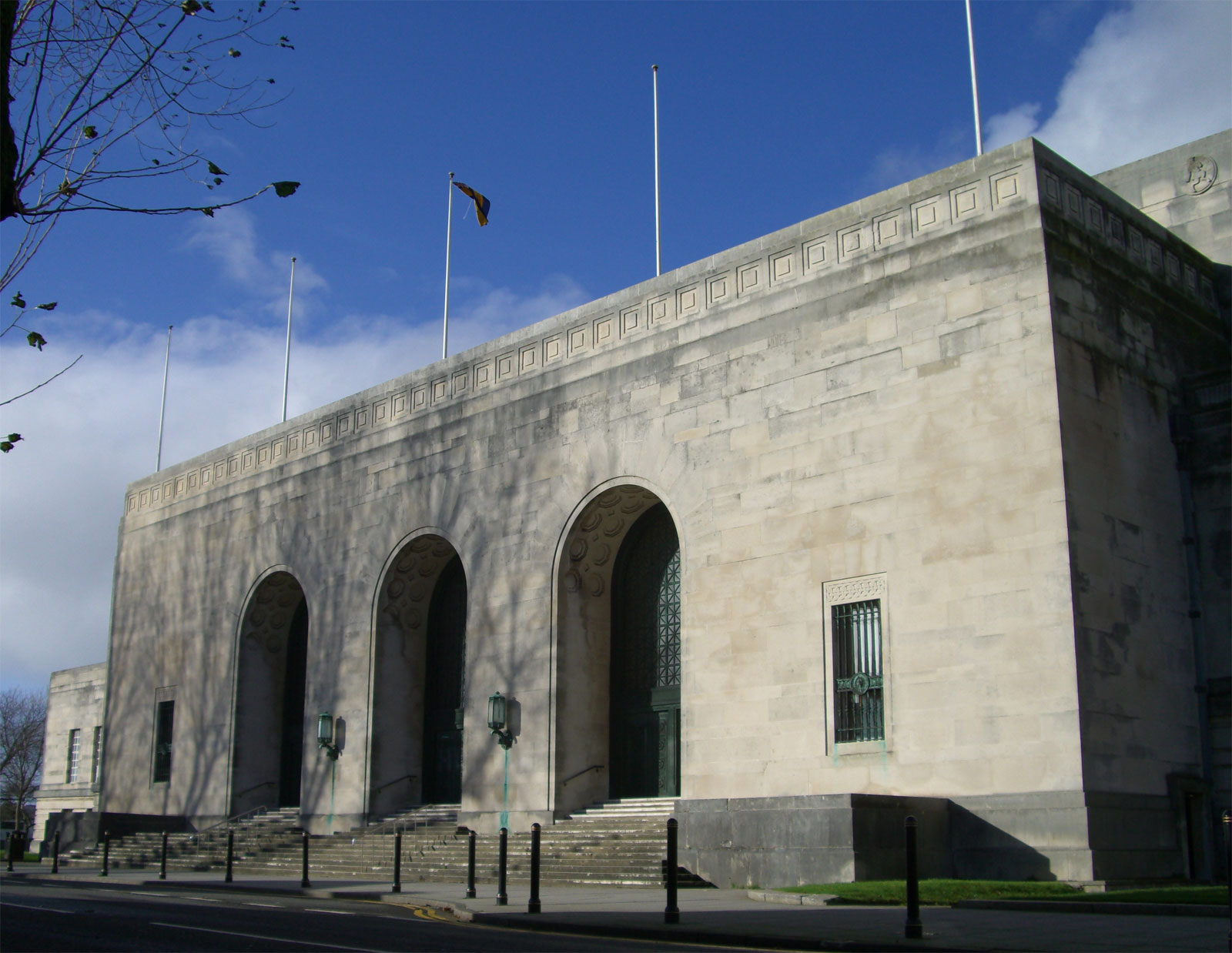
Brangwyn Hall's main entrance

The Royal Institution of South Wales was founded in 1835 as the Swansea Literary and Philosophical Society.

=== Performing arts ===
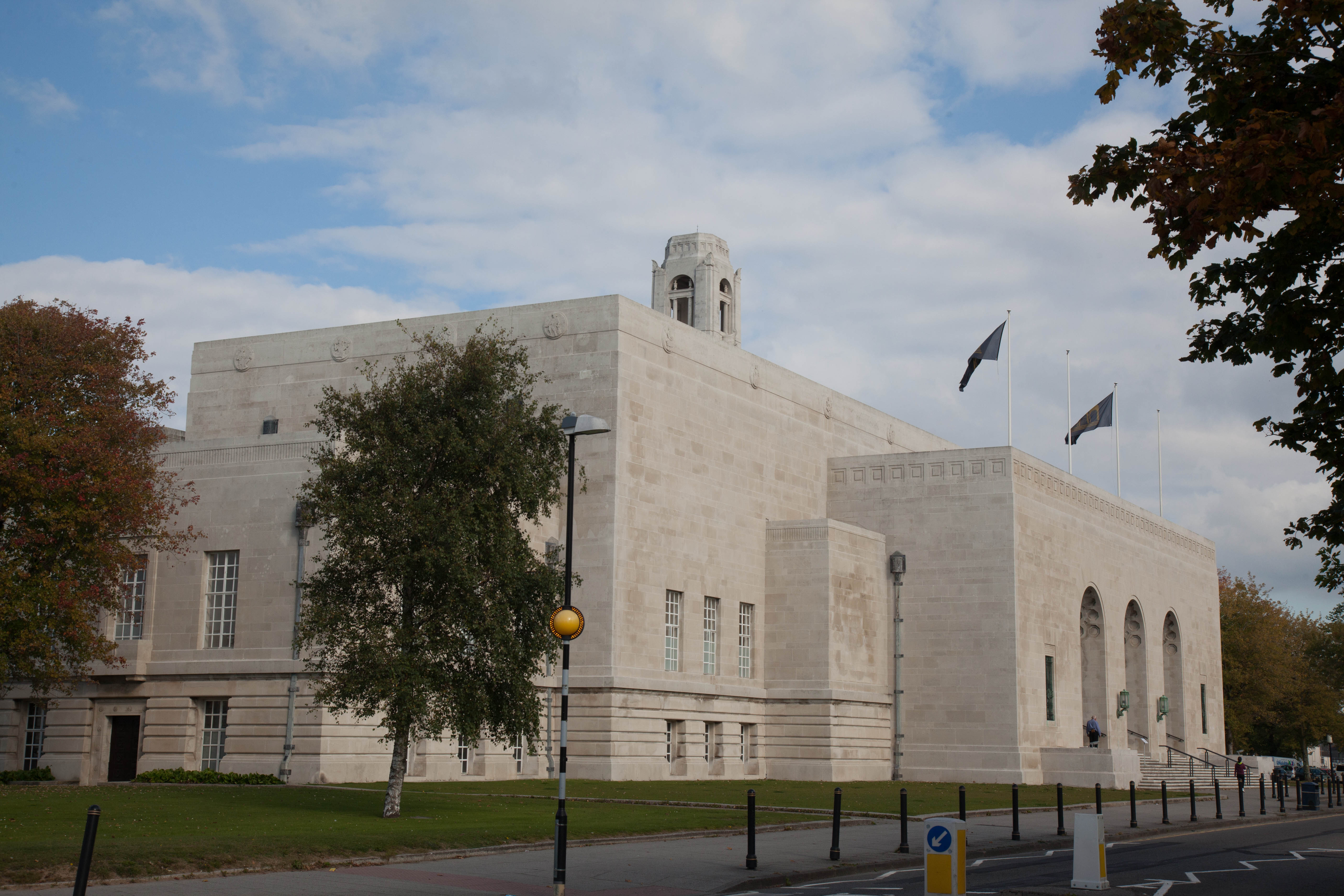
Brangwyn Hall, one of the Senedd buildings

The Grand Theatre in the centre of the city is a Victorian theatre which celebrated its centenary in 1997 and which has a capacity of a little over a thousand people. It was opened by the celebrated opera singer Adelina Patti and was refurbished from 1983 to 1987. The annual programme ranges from pantomime and drama to opera and ballet.

Fluellen Theatre Company is a professional theatre company based in Swansea who perform at the Grand Theatre and the Dylan Thomas Centre. The Taliesin building on the university campus has a theatre, opened in 1984.

Other theatres include the Dylan Thomas Theatre (formerly the Little Theatre), near the marina, and one in Penyrheol Leisure Centre near Gorseinon. In the summer, outdoor Shakespeare performances are a regular feature at Oystermouth Castle; Singleton Park is the venue for a number of parties and concerts, from dance music to outdoor Proms. A folk festival is held on Gower. Standing near Victoria Park on the coast road is the Patti Pavilion; this was the Winter Garden from Adelina Patti's Craig-y-Nos estate in the upper Swansea valley, which she donated to the town in 1918. It is used as a venue for music shows and fairs. The Brangwyn Hall is a multi-use venue, with events such as the graduation ceremonies for Swansea University. Every autumn, Swansea hosts a Festival of Music and the Arts, when international orchestras and soloists visit the Brangwyn Hall. The Brangwyn Hall is praised for its acoustics for recitals, orchestral pieces and chamber music alike.

Swansea is home to the Palace Theatre. Located at 156 High Street, it is recognisable for its distinctive wedge shape. Originally built in 1888 as a traditional music hall, the building's original name was the Pavilion. During its lifetime, the building has been used as a bingo hall as well as a nightclub.

In 2018, Singleton Park, Swansea was the home-city for BBC Music's 'Biggest Weekend' featuring Ed Sheeran, Taylor Swift, Sam Smith, Florence + The Machine and others. Priority was given to Swansea residents in purchasing tickets for this one-off 'day festival' (over 2 days); tickets were priced at £18 a day and all 60,000 tickets (30,000 for each day) sold out almost instantly.

=== Festivals ===
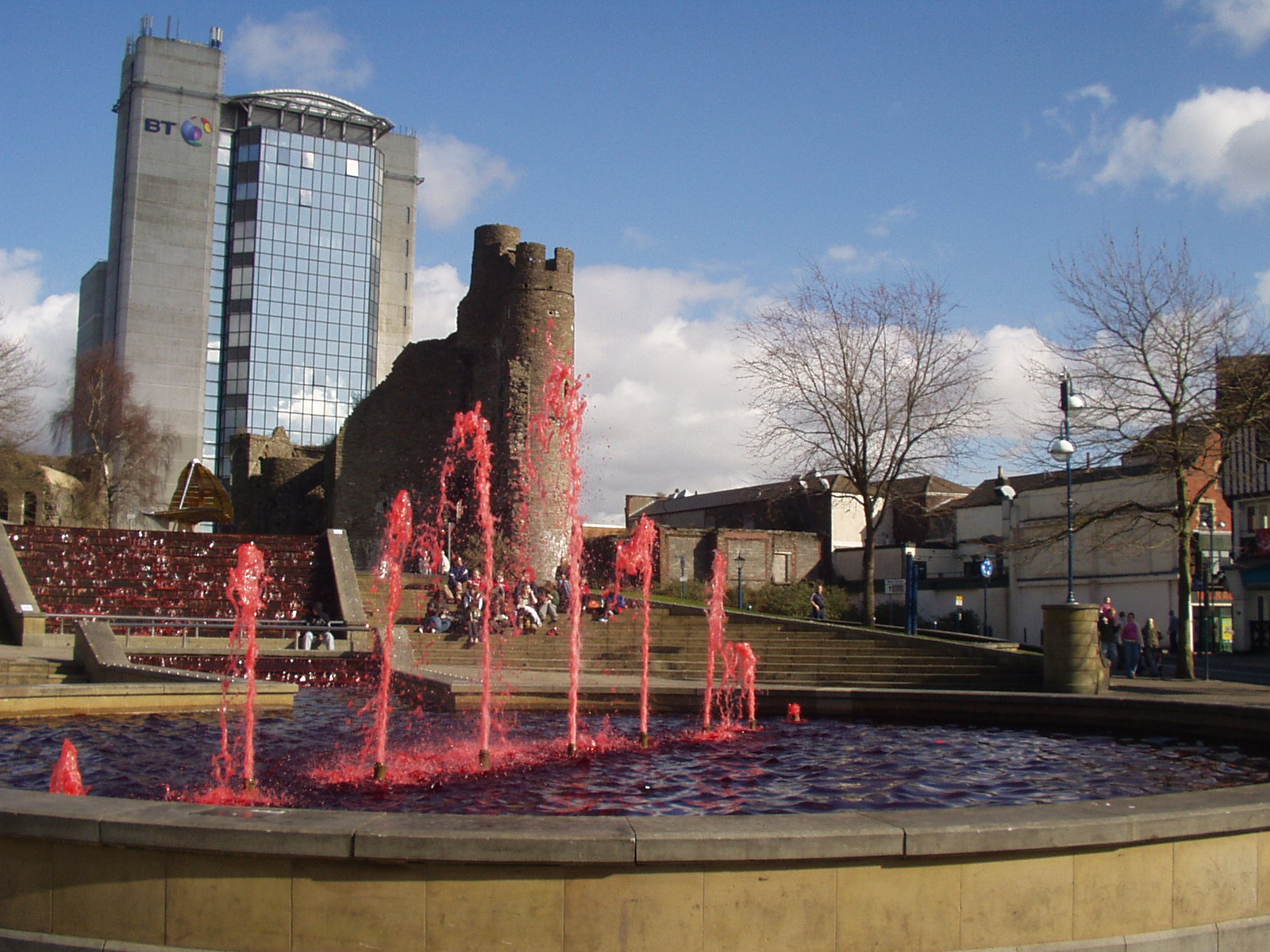
Red fountain water during the celebration of St David's Day

Swansea hosted the National Eisteddfod in 1863, 1891, 1907, 1926, 1964, 1982 and 2006. The 2006 event occupied the site of the former Felindre tinplate works to the north of the city and featured a strikingly pink main tent. In 2009 Swansea Council launched Wales's only week long St David's Week festival in venues throughout the city. The Beginning and Do Not Go Gentle are Festivals in the Uplands area of the city, where Dylan Thomas was born and lived for 23 years.

Swansea is known for its celebration of Beaujolais Day, with people booking tables in restaurants and bars for the day up to a year in advance to ensure they can sample the year's newly released Beaujolais wine. Historian Peter Stead argues that its rise in popularity there can be traced to the city's No Sign Bar, owned in the 1960s by former Wales rugby union captain Clem Thomas, who owned a house in Burgundy and could transport Beaujolais quickly and cheaply to south Wales, and suggests that it reflected Swansea's efforts to "gentrify and intellectualise itself" at the time. In 2015, it was estimated that Beaujolais Day contributed £5 million to the local economy.

=== Welsh language ===
There are many Welsh language chapels in the area. Welsh-medium education is a popular and growing choice for both English- and Welsh-speaking families. Just over 1,600 secondary pupils were educated through the medium of Welsh in 2017. Nearly double this figure, 3,063 pupils, are currently educated through the medium of Welsh in the primary sector. The 2014 Swansea Pre-School survey showed that 35% of parents across the city and county of Swansea would select a Welsh education for their children if there was a local Welsh school available to them. 45% of the rural council ward Mawr are able to speak Welsh, as can 38% of the ward of Pontarddulais. Clydach, Kingsbridge and Upper Loughor all have levels of more than 20%. By contrast, the urban St. Thomas has one of the lowest figures in Wales, at 6.4%, a figure only barely lower than Penderry and Townhill wards.

=== Food ===
Local produce includes cockles and laverbread sourced from the Loughor estuary. Salt marsh lamb, raised in the salt marshes of the estuary, is also a local speciality.

=== Listed buildings ===
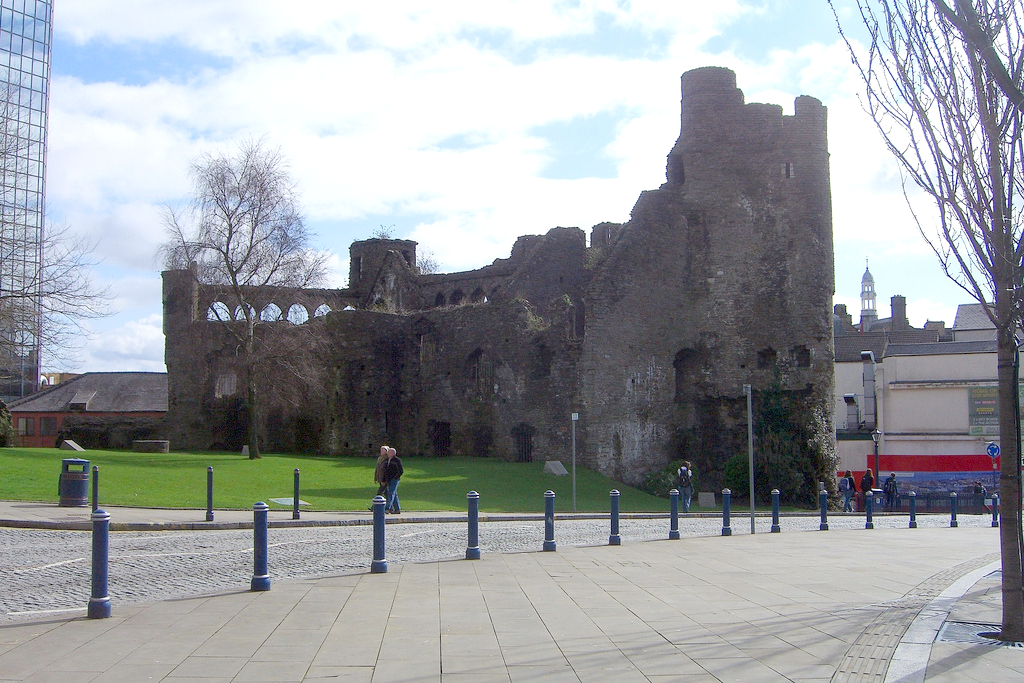
Swansea Castle ruins

The city has three Grade One listed buildings: Swansea Castle, the Tabernacle Chapel, Morriston and the Swansea Guildhall. Swansea Castle was an impressive building occupying a strategic position above the River Tawe. The ruins that are visible today date from the late 13th and early 14th centuries. Today, the castle is hemmed in by modern buildings. The Tabernacle Chapel at Morriston was built in 1872 by John Humphreys of Swansea. A unique feature is the use of semi-circular arches. The building has been described as the "Nonconformist Cathedral of Wales" and has been listed as Grade I on the basis that it is "the most ambitious grand chapel in Wales, its interior and fittings remain virtually unaltered". The Guildhall is one of the main office buildings in the centre of the city and was designed by Percy Thomas and opened in 1934. It is faced in white Portland stone and includes a tall clock-tower which makes it a landmark. The building comprises the City Hall, the Brangwyn Hall concert venue and the County Law Courts. It is considered "the most important building in Wales of its period".

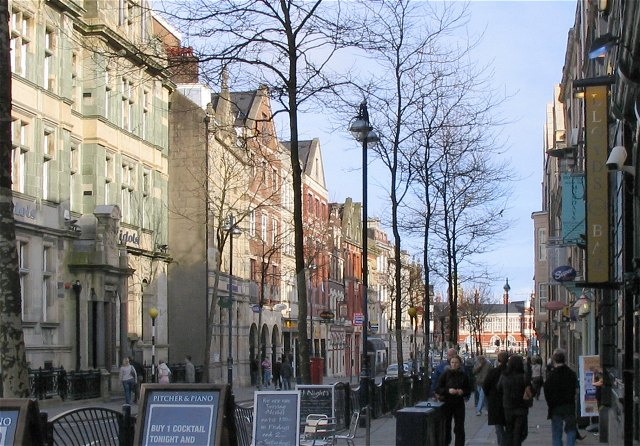
Wind Street

In addition to these, there are a number of Grade II* listed buildings; Ebenezer Baptist Chapel and its Hall in Ebenezer Street; the Glynn Vivian Art Gallery; the Midland Bank building; the Mount Pleasant Baptist Church in Kingsway, along with its Hall and School blocks; the Offices of Associated British Ports in Pier Street; the Royal Institution of South Wales building, now Swansea Museum in Victoria Road; and the Old Guildhall in Somerset Place.

== Sport ==
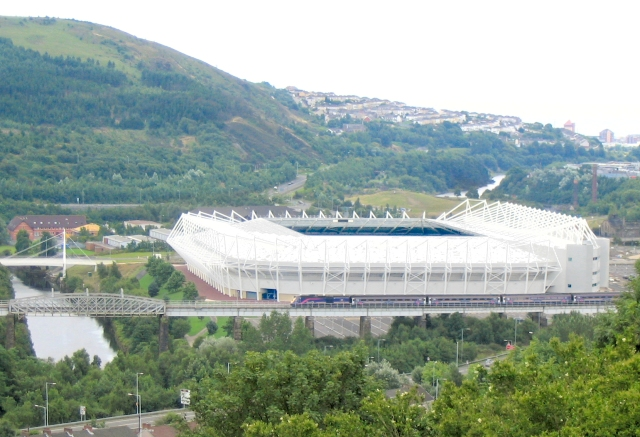
The Swansea.com Stadium, formerly known as the Liberty Stadium

Swansea City A.F.C. was founded in 1912 and is the city's main football association team. Originally playing at the Vetch Field, they moved to the Swansea.com Stadium (then known as the Liberty Stadium) at the start of the 2005–06 season, winning promotion to League One in their final year at their old stadium. The team presently play in the English Championship, after spending seven seasons in the English Premier League. The Football Association of Wales had decided that for the Euro 2012 qualifying campaign, Wales would play all of their home ties at either the Cardiff City Stadium or the Liberty Stadium.

Swansea has two association football clubs that play in the Welsh football league system: Pure Swansea F.C. and West End F.C. Two more Welsh league clubs are within the ceremonial City and County of Swansea but outside of Swansea proper: Garden Village F.C. in the town of Gorseinon, and South Gower A.F.C. in the village of Scurlage.

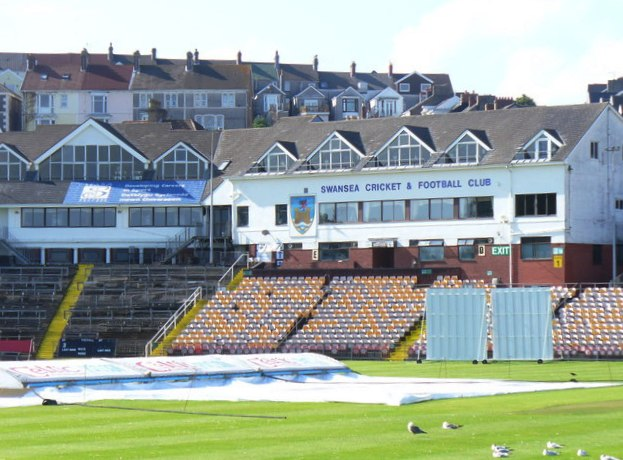
Swansea Rugby and Cricket Club

Swansea is home to Swansea Rugby Football Club (Swansea RFC), a founder member of the Welsh Rugby Union and one of the most important teams in the early history of Welsh rugby union. Playing out of St Helens Rugby and Cricket Ground the club not only produced several of the greatest Welsh rugby superstars, including Billy Bancroft and Billy Trew, they also hosted national touring sides from Australia, South Africa and New Zealand. Known as the All Whites, Swansea kept a constant supply of players that filled the Welsh ranks in the early history of the game. In 1935 Swansea became the first club side to beat the All Blacks.

In 2003, Swansea RFC merged with Neath RFC to form the Ospreys. Swansea RFC remained at St Helen's in semi-professional form, but the Ospreys moved into the Liberty Stadium in Landore for the start of the 2005–06 season. Neath-Swansea rugby games used to be hotly contested matches, such that there was some debate about whether a team incorporating both areas was possible. The team came fifth in the Celtic League in their first year of existence and topped that league in their second year. By 2012, they had won the league a then-record four times.

St Helens Rugby and Cricket Ground is the home of Swansea RFC and Glamorgan County Cricket Club have previously played matches there. In this ground, Sir Garfield Sobers hit six sixes in one over; the first time this was achieved in a game of first-class cricket. The final ball landed on the ground past the Cricketers' pub just outside the ground. It is also the home of the tallest floodlight stand in Europe.

Swansea's rugby league side plays 13 miles (21 kilometres) from Swansea in the small town of Ystalyfera. They are known as the Swansea Valley Miners, but were formed as the Swansea Bulls in 2002.

The Swansea Bowls Stadium opened in early 2008. The stadium hosted the World Indoor Singles and Mixed Pairs Championship in April 2008 and the Gravelles Welsh International Open Bowls Championships in 2009.

== Future plans ==
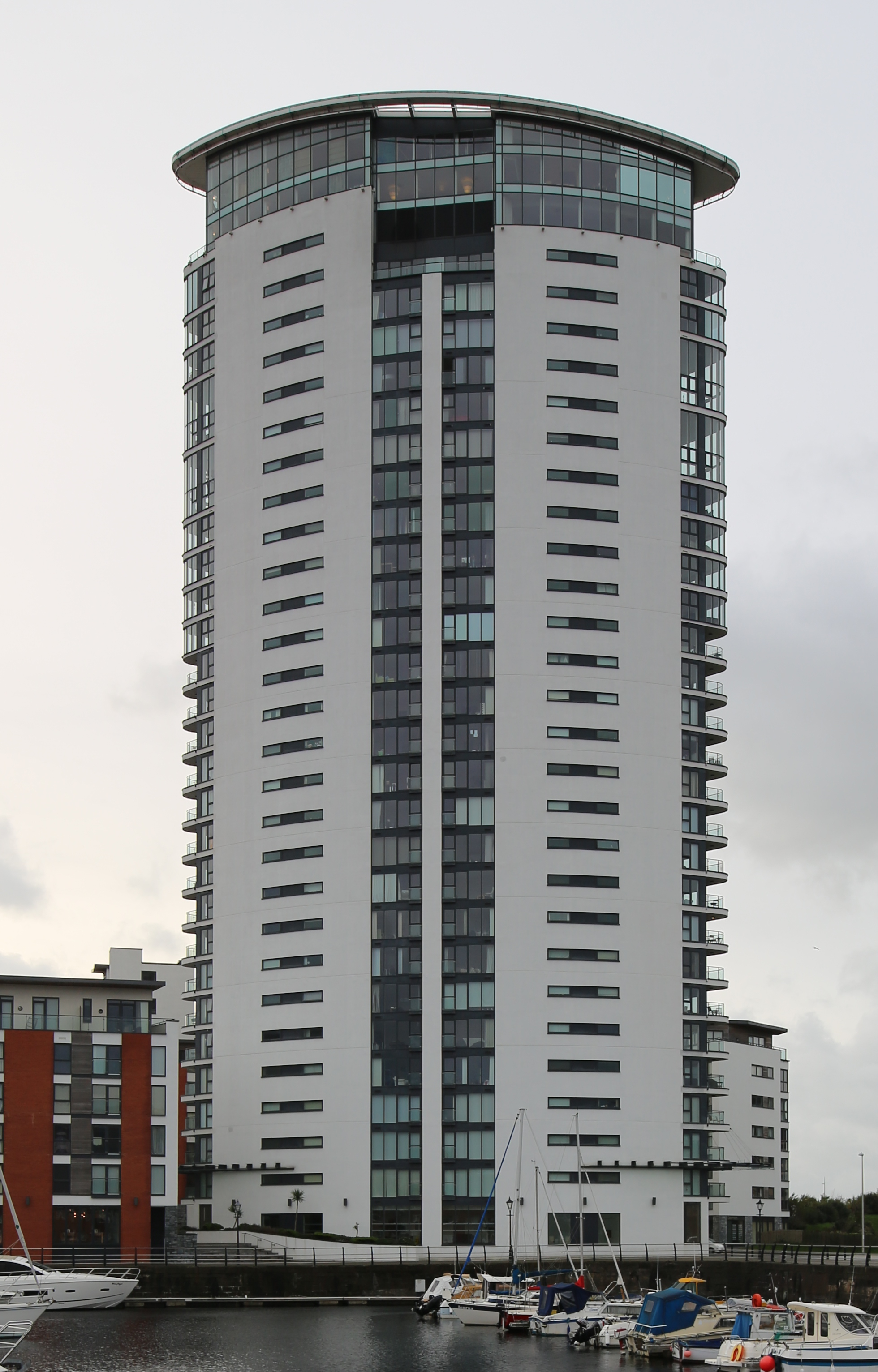
The Tower, Meridian Quay – tallest building in Wales

Swansea city centre is undergoing a £1 billion transformation scheme. A large area of the city is earmarked for redevelopment. A new city-centre retail precinct is planned involving demolition of the dilapidated St. David's Shopping Centre which has three or four traders, about 13% of the retail space in the centre and the Quadrant Shopping Centre. Including relocation of the Tesco Superstore near to the city's Sainsbury's store in Parc Tawe, the new retail precinct will be almost four times the size of the Quadrant Centre. The city centre is also being brightened up with street art and new walkways, along with the first phase of the David Evans – Castle Street development. New green spaces will be provided in conjunction with the proposed Quadrant Square and Grand Theatre Square. Redevelopment of the Oxford Street car park and Lower Oxford Street arcades are also planned.

At the seafront, The Tower, Meridian Quay is now Wales's tallest building at a height of 107 metres (351 ft) with a restaurant on the top (29th) floor. It was under construction adjacent Swansea Marina until 2010.

== Economy ==
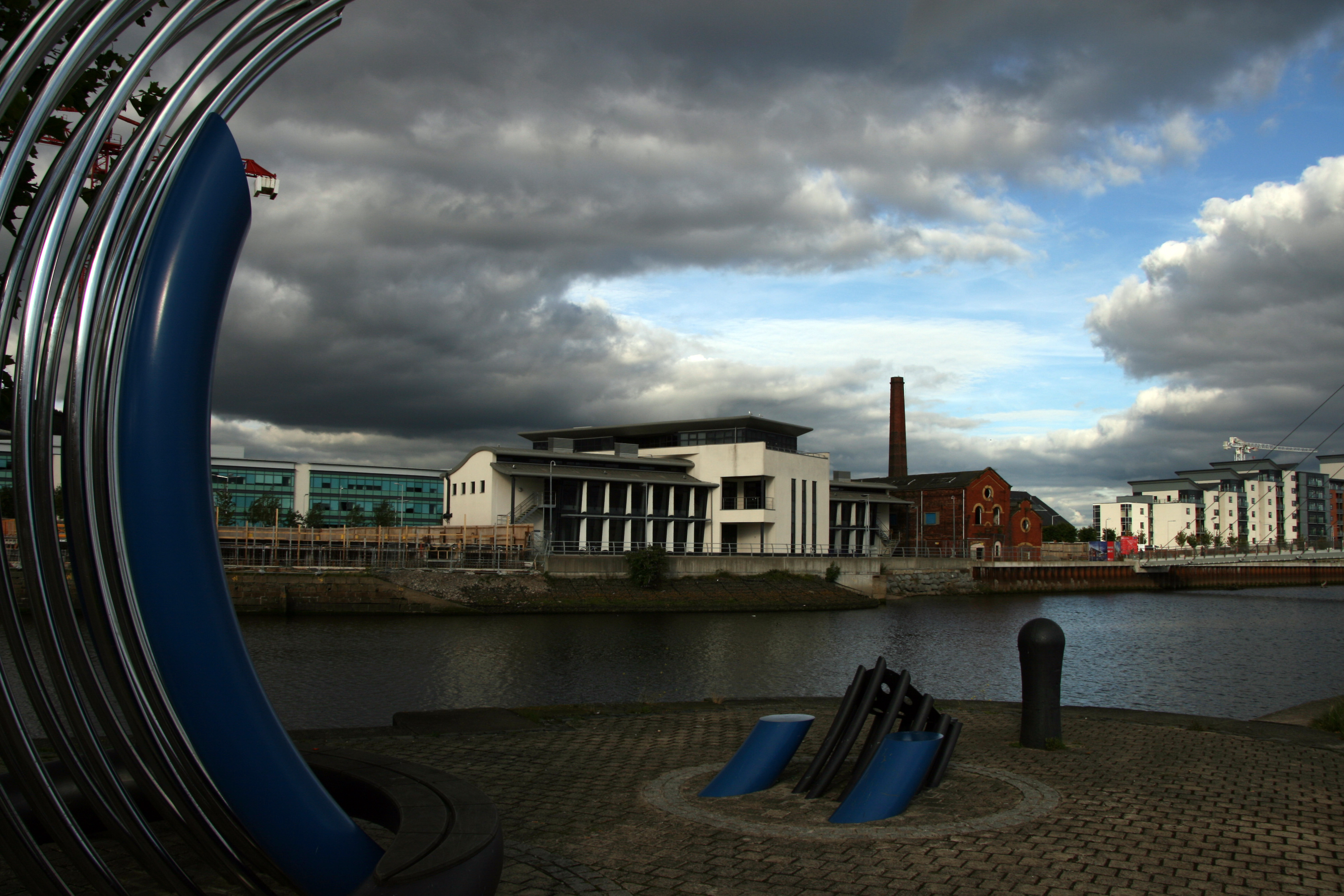
The Technium centre, one of the first of the new buildings built as part of the SA1 development scheme at Swansea Docks

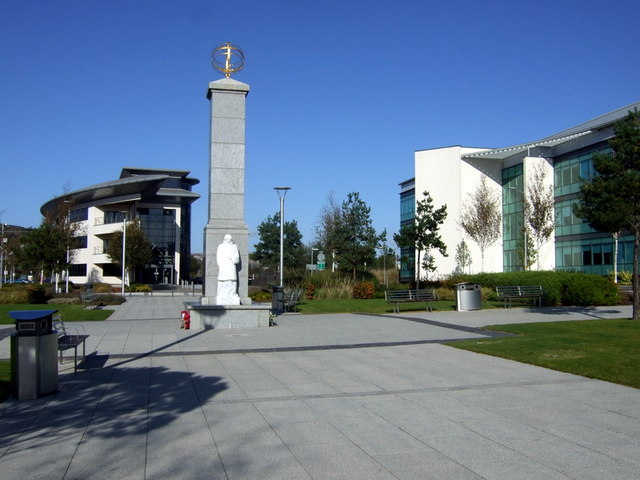
Part of the Swansea Waterfront developments

Swansea originally developed as centre for metals and mining, especially the copper industry, from the beginning of the 18th century. The industry reached its apogee in the 1880s, when 60% of the copper ores imported to Britain were smelted in the Lower Swansea valley. However, by the end of the Second World War these heavy industries were in decline, and over the post-war decades Swansea shared in the general trend towards a post-industrial, service sector economy.

Of the 105,900 people estimated to work within the City and County of Swansea, over 90% are employed in the service sectors, with relatively high shares (compared to the Welsh and UK averages) in public administration, education & health and banking, finance & insurance, and correspondingly high proportions of employment in occupations associated with the service sector, including professional, administrative/secretarial and sales/customer service occupations. The local authority believes this pattern reflects Swansea's role as a service centre for South West Wales.

Economic activity and employment rates in Swansea were slightly above the Welsh average in October 2008, but lower than the UK average. In 2005, GVA per head in Swansea was £14,302 – nearly 4% above the Welsh average but 20% below the UK average. Median full-time earnings in Swansea were £21,577 in 2007, almost identical to the Welsh average.

Swansea is home to the DVLA headquarters in Morriston, which employs around 6,000 people in the city. Other major employers in the city are Admiral Group, HSBC, Virgin Media, Swansea Bay University Health Board, BT and Amazon.co.uk. Virgin Atlantic also maintains its largest worldwide contact centre in Swansea; including reservations, sales, baggage claims and customer relations.

== Education ==
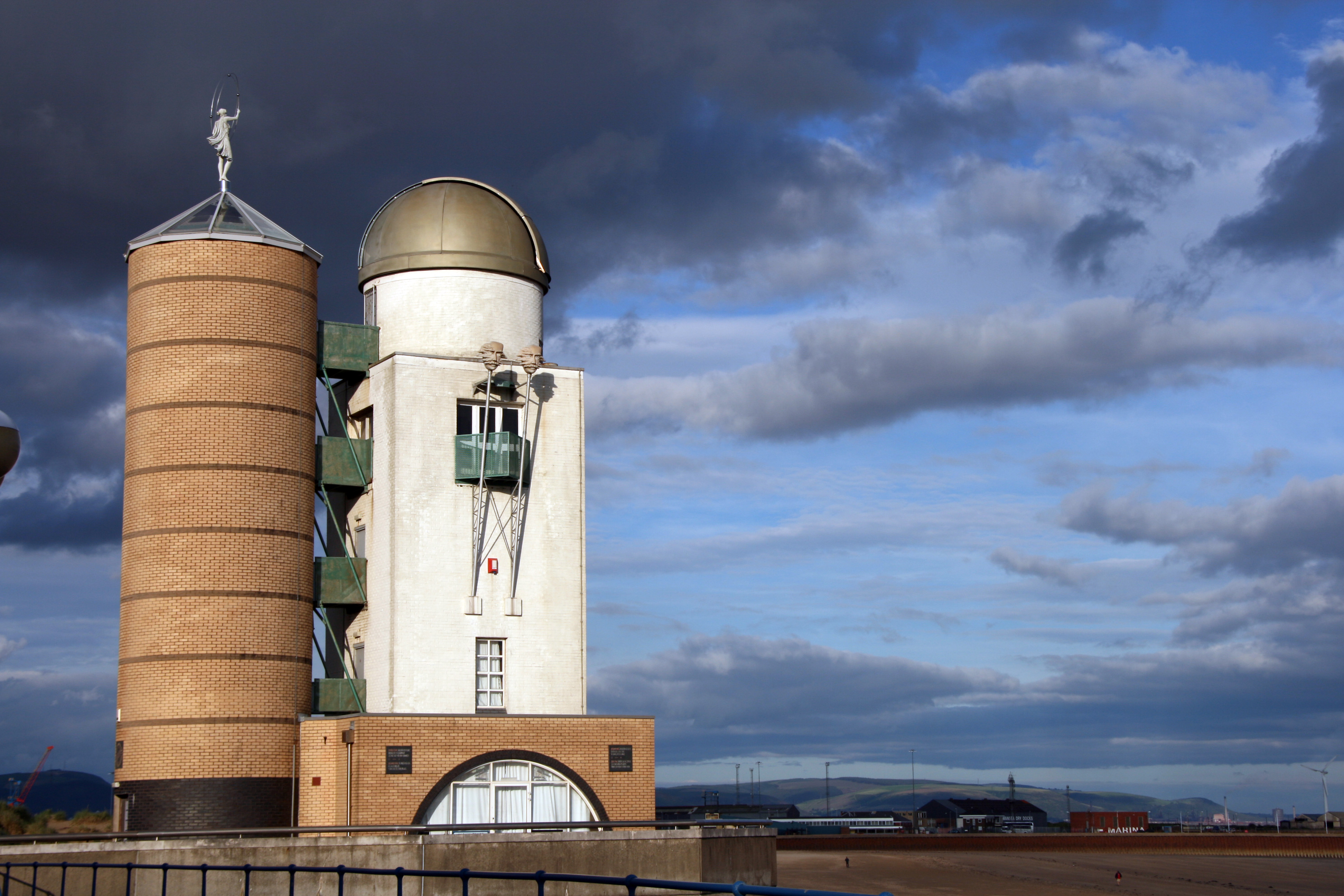
The observatory

=== Further and higher education ===
Swansea University has a campus in Singleton Park overlooking Swansea Bay. Its engineering department is recognised as a centre of excellence with work on computational techniques for solving engineering design problems. The department of physics is known for its research at the frontiers of theoretical physics, particularly in the areas of elementary particle physics and string theory. In 2015, Swansea University opened a new Bay Campus situated in the Jersey Marine area of Swansea. In 2017, Swansea University Medical School was ranked as the third best medical school in the United Kingdom, behind Oxford and Cambridge.

Other institutions include the University of Wales Trinity Saint David, Gower College Swansea and Swansea College. Trinity Saint David was formed in 2010 through the merger of University of Wales Lampeter and Trinity University college Carmarthen under Lampeter's royal charter of 1828. In 2013, Swansea Metropolitan University became part of University of Wales Trinity Saint David (UWTSD). Swansea Metropolitan University was particularly well known for its Architectural Glass department, as well as its Teaching and Transport & Logistics degrees. Trinity Saint David also took over the Swansea Business School, which was formerly part of the Metropolitan University. Swansea Sixth Form College Wales (sscwales) was founded in 2013 and changed its name to Swansea College in 2021.

=== Schools ===
In the local authority area, there is one nursery school, six infant schools and five junior schools. There are 77 primary schools, ten of which are Welsh-medium, and six of which are voluntary aided. There are 14 comprehensive schools under the remit of the local education authority, of which two are Welsh-medium. In addition, there are six special schools.

The oldest school in Swansea is Bishop Gore School, founded in 1682. The largest comprehensive school is Olchfa School. There is one Roman Catholic comprehensive school – Bishop Vaughan Catholic Comprehensive School. Other secondary schools include Birchgrove Comprehensive School, Cefn Hengoed Community School, Dylan Thomas School, Pentrehafod Comprehensive School, Morriston Comprehensive School and Gowerton School. There are 2 Welsh-medium secondary schools in Swansea: Ysgol Gyfun Gymraeg Gŵyr and Ysgol Gyfun Gymraeg Bryn Tawe.

Independent schools in Swansea include Ffynone House School and Oakleigh House School.

== Media ==
The local newspaper is the Swansea edition of the South Wales Evening Post. The Swansea Herald of Wales was a free newspaper which was distributed every week to residential addresses until 2011 when the paper ceased to be in print. The council also produces a free monthly newspaper called the Swansea Leader. Swansea Life is a monthly lifestyle magazine published and distributed in Swansea.

Swansea is served by five Independent Local Radio stations: Hits Radio South Wales, its sister station Greatest Hits Radio South Wales, Swansea Bay Radio, Heart South Wales and Nation Radio Wales. A community radio station, Radio Tircoed, serves the city's western suburbs. Patients and staff at Singleton Hospital can listen to the hospital radio station, Radio City 1386AM, and Swansea University runs its own radio station, Xtreme Radio. Providing the DAB service, the local multiplex called Swansea SW Wales is broadcast from Kilvey Hill. This transmitter also provides digital terrestrial television in the Swansea area. As well as Kilvey Hill, the city is in the catchment areas of the Wenvoe transmitter (in the Vale of Glamorgan) and the Carmel transmitter in Carmarthenshire.

The local television service, That's Swansea Bay, went on air in July 2016, becoming the second local television station in Wales after Made in Cardiff. Bay TV Swansea is based near the University of Wales Trinity Saint David's primary campus in Swansea.

Since 1924, the BBC has maintained a studio in the city; Dylan Thomas worked here in the interwar years, when the studio was used for the BBC Regional Programme. Currently it has facilities to broadcast live radio and television and is listed as a BBC regional studio.

In mid-2008, the BBC included Swansea in its Big Screen project and a large live permanent television screen has been sited in Castle Square.

Independent filmmakers Undercurrents and Studio8 are based in Swansea, and the city plays host to the BeyondTV Film Festival. Swansea has also hosted the annual Swansea Bay Film Festival, where past-winning directors have included Gareth Evans, Anthony James, Alun D Pughe and Andrew Jones.

=== In popular culture ===
Swansea has been used as a location for films such as Only Two Can Play, Submarine and Twin Town, the TV series Mine All Mine and in episodes of Doctor Who.

Swansea was the first city in Wales to feature in its own version of the board game Monopoly. The Swansea edition of Monopoly features 33 local landmarks, including the Mumbles Pier and the National Waterfront Museum; the game has been produced in both English and Welsh.

Swansea was also featured in a television documentary, titled Swansea Love Story, as part of the Rule Britannia series on VBS.tv. The film is of a rather graphic nature and features heroin users, as well as community members affected by the narcotic, while trying to provide some explanation for the increase in use.

Swansea is the hometown of Edward Kenway, the main protagonist of the video game Assassin's Creed IV: Black Flag. This is because Matt Ryan, the voice actor of Edward, is from Swansea.

The Swansea Criteria, a diagnostic tool to identify acute fatty liver of pregnancy, originated from a research group working in Singleton Hospital, Swansea.

== Public services ==
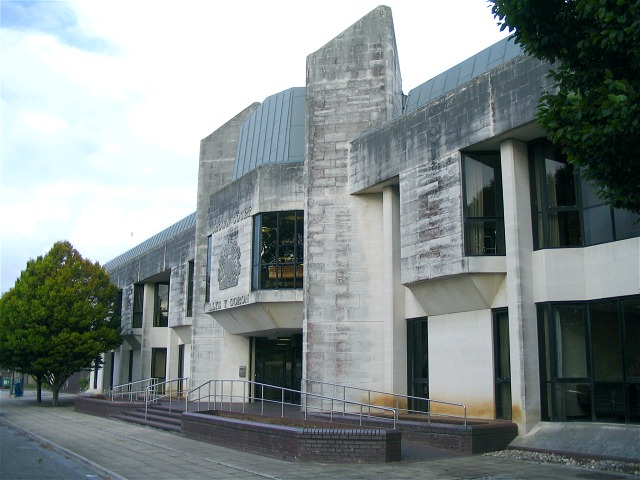
Swansea Crown Court

Swansea is policed by the South Wales Police. The regional headquarters for the Swansea area is Swansea Central Police Station.

Ambulance services are provided by the Welsh Ambulance Service, and fire services by the Mid and West Wales Fire and Rescue Service. Swansea Airport is one of the country's three Wales Air Ambulance bases, the others being Welshpool and Caernarfon.

Local public healthcare services are operated by Swansea Bay University Health Board, which operates two hospitals in Swansea: Singleton Hospital and Morriston Hospital; the latter provides Accident and Emergency services. Singleton Hospital has one of Wales's three radiotherapy departments.

Waste management services are coordinated by the local council, which deals with refuse collection and recycling and operates five civic amenity sites.

The electricity distribution network operator supplying Swansea is Western Power Distribution.

Welsh Water provides drinking water supply and wastewater services to Swansea. There is a water treatment works at Crymlyn Burrows. Reservoirs which supply Swansea include the Cray reservoir and the Lliw Reservoirs, which are operated by Welsh Water.

The Local Gas Distribution company is Wales and West Utilities.

== Public order ==
There was a high rate of car crime during the 1990s, with Swansea being dubbed as the "car crime capital of the United Kingdom". In 2002, the BBC described Swansea as a "black spot for car crime". Car crime is a central theme in the film Twin Town, which was set in and around Swansea and Port Talbot.

The football violence that Swansea experienced during the 1970s–1990s has considerably reduced; the only major clashes occurring between Swansea City supporters and Cardiff City supporters. Many matches between these sides have ended in violence in both Swansea and Cardiff. These two clubs have a long history of intense rivalry, so much so that it is described in the media as "tribal".

== Leisure and tourism ==
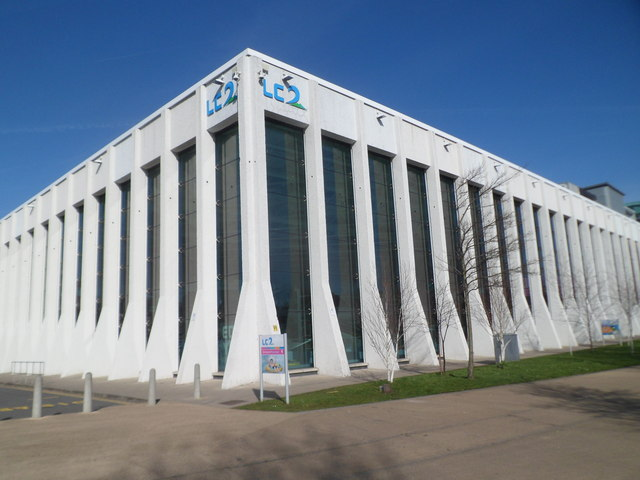
The LC leisure centre

A number of beaches around Gower are promoted to visitors. Surfing is possible at Langland Bay, Caswell Bay and Llangennith, with the latter winning accolades from two national newspapers for the quality of its waves. The five-mile (eight-kilometre) promenade from the Marina to Mumbles offers views across Swansea Bay. The seaside village of Mumbles has a Victorian pier, small independent shops and boutiques, restaurants and cafes. The south coast of Gower is the chief magnet for walkers, with a path stretching from Mumbles Head across the cliff tops, beaches and coastal woodland to Rhossili.

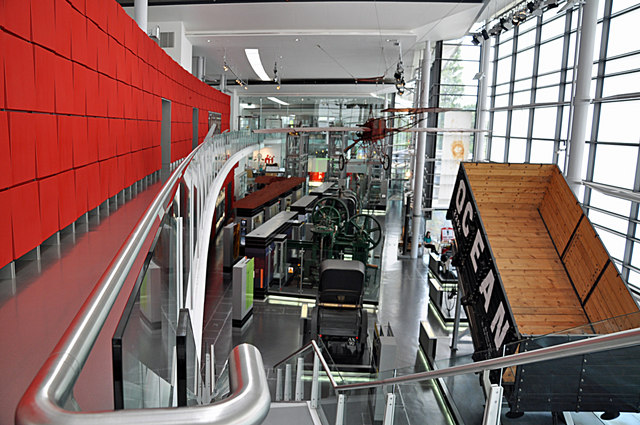
The National Waterfront Museum

On the waterfront, Swansea Bay has a five-mile (eight-kilometre) sweep of coastline which features a beach, promenade, children's lido, leisure pool, marina and maritime quarter featuring the museums the National Waterfront Museum and Swansea Museum, the oldest museum in Wales. Also situated in the maritime quarter is the Dylan Thomas Centre, which celebrates the life and work of the author with its permanent exhibition 'Dylan Thomas – Man and Myth', and Mission Gallery, a unique art gallery also in the heart of the Maritime Quarter which hosts a range of exhibitions from various art disciplines; it also host a craft space, with ranging works from local and international artists. The Dylan Thomas Centre is the focal point for the annual Dylan Thomas Festival (27 October – 9 November). There is a permanent exhibition at the Dylan Thomas Birthplace and Home for 23 years in Uplands, which has been restored to its condition as a new house when bought by the Thomas family in 1914, a few months before Dylan was born in the front bedroom. The SA1 Waterfront area is the latest development for living, dining and leisure.

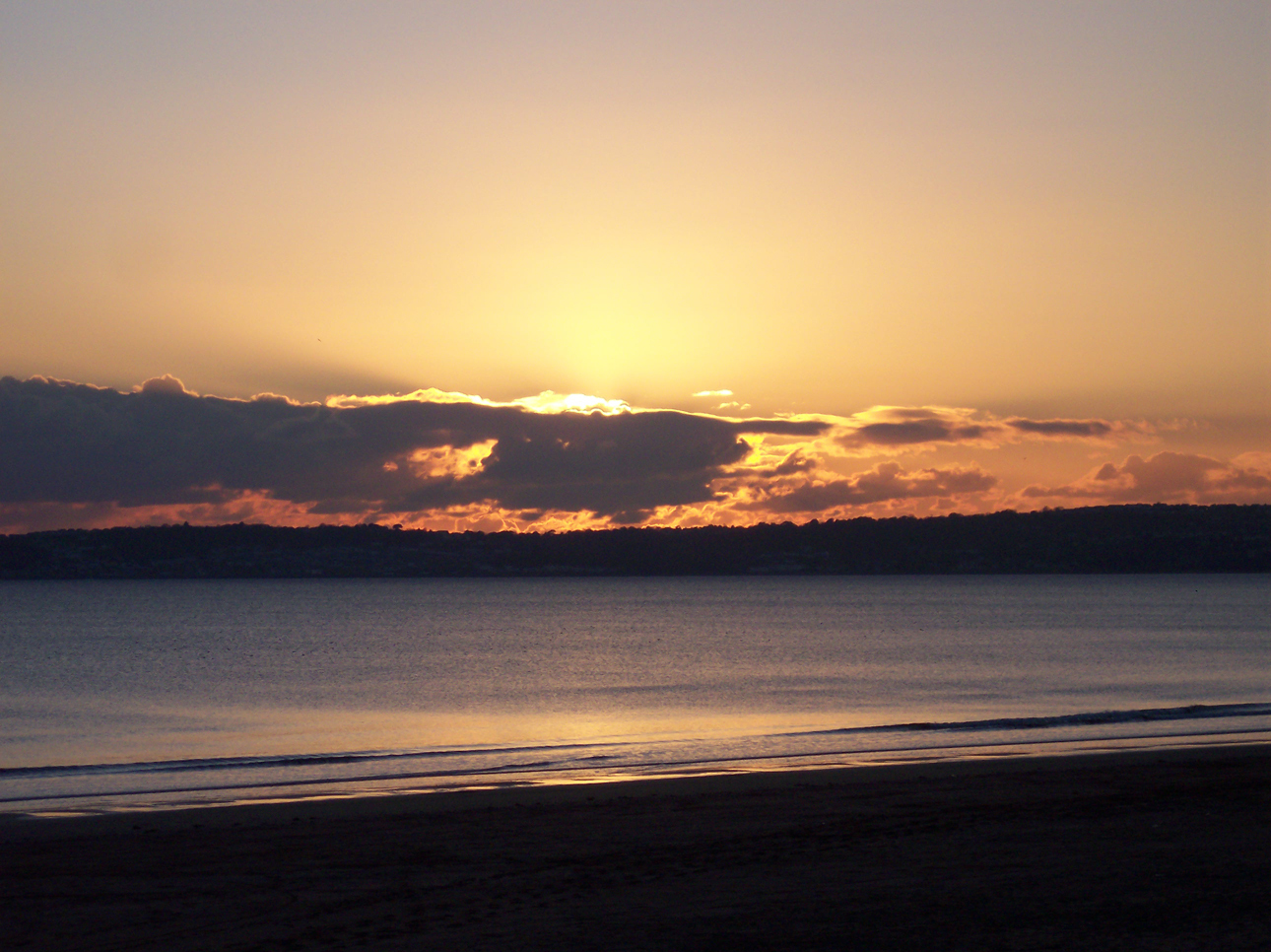
Sunset over Swansea Bay

Swansea Bay, Mumbles and Gower are home to various parks and gardens and almost 20 nature reserves. Clyne Gardens is home to a collection of plants set in parkland and host to 'Clyne in Bloom' in May. Singleton Park has acres of parkland, a botanical garden, a boating lake with pedal boats, and crazy golf. Plantasia is a tropical hothouse pyramid featuring three climatic zones, housing a variety of unusual plants, including several species which are extinct in the wild, and monkeys, reptiles, fish and a butterfly house. Other parks include Cwmdonkin Park, where Dylan Thomas played as a child, and Victoria Park which is close to the promenade on the seafront.

Oxwich Bay on the Gower Peninsula was named the most beautiful beach in the United Kingdom by travel writers who visited more than 1,000 beaches around the world in search of the perfect sands (2007). The Travel Magazine praised Oxwich for "magnificent and unspoilt" scenery and as a "great place for adults and children to explore". It has over three miles (5 km) of sand and The Guardian named it one of Britain's blue-riband top 10 category beaches (2007). The Independent newspaper hailed Rhossili Bay as "the British supermodel of beaches" (2006) and the best beach in Britain for breathtaking cliffs (2007), whilst The Sunday Times listed it as one of the 25 best beaches in the world (2006). Thanks to its clear air and lovely golden sand, this romantic stretch of sand was voted the best place in the UK to watch the sun set (Country Living magazine 2005) and one of the top romantic spots in the country (The Guardian 2007).

Llangennith Beach, with its soft sands, consistent beach break and great facilities, was listed as the best place to learn how to surf in Britain by The Observer (2006) and one of the 10 'classic surfing beaches by The Guardian (2007). Gower also claims Britain's Best Beach, Three Cliffs Bay. The Gower landmark topped the BBC Holiday Hit Squad nationwide competition (2006) and was voted Britain's best camping beach by The Independent thanks to its superb setting and quiet location (2007). Three Cliffs Bay also made the final of the ITV series Britain's Favourite View – the only nomination in Wales and backed by singer Katherine Jenkins. Nearby Brandy Cove came sixth in an online poll to find the UK's top beach for the baby boomer generation (2006). Beaches which won 2006 Blue Flag Beach Awards are: Bracelet Bay, Caswell Bay, Langland Bay, Port Eynon Bay and Swansea Marina (one of the few Blue Flag Marinas in Wales). All of these beaches also won a Seaside Award 2006. Limeslade was awarded the Rural Seaside Award and the Green Coast Award. Other Green Coast Awards went to Pwll Du, Rhossili Bay and Tor Bay.

Swansea Pride was founded in 2008, and it is often hosted yearly in June.

=== Activities ===
Swansea has a range of facilities for activities including sailing, water skiing, surfing, walking and cycling. Part of the Celtic Trail and the National Cycle Network, Swansea Bay provides a range of traffic-free cycle routes including along the seafront and through Clyne Valley Country Park. The Cycling Touring Club CTC has a local group in the area. Swansea Bay, Mumbles and Gower have a selection of golf courses.

Prior to closure in 2003, Swansea Leisure Centre was one of the top ten visitor attractions in the Wales; it has been redeveloped as an indoor waterpark, rebranded the LC, and was officially opened by Queen Elizabeth II on 7 March 2008. The Wales National Pool is in Swansea.

=== Nightlife ===
Swansea has a number of pubs, bars, clubs, restaurants and a casino. Swansea had two casinos until 30 August 2012 when Aspers closed. The majority of city centre bars are situated on Wind Street. Some venues feature live music. The Mumbles Mile, described by the BBC as "one of Wales's best-known pub crawls", declined in the early 21st century and a number of local pubs were converted into flats or restaurants.

== Twinning ==
Swansea is twinned with:

- Cork, Ireland
- Mannheim, Baden-Württemberg, Germany;
- Pau, Pyrénées-Atlantiques, Nouvelle-Aquitaine, France
- Bydgoszcz, Kuyavian-Pomeranian Voivodeship, Poland.
- Wuhan, China

It also has a friendship link with Nantong, China.

== Notable people ==
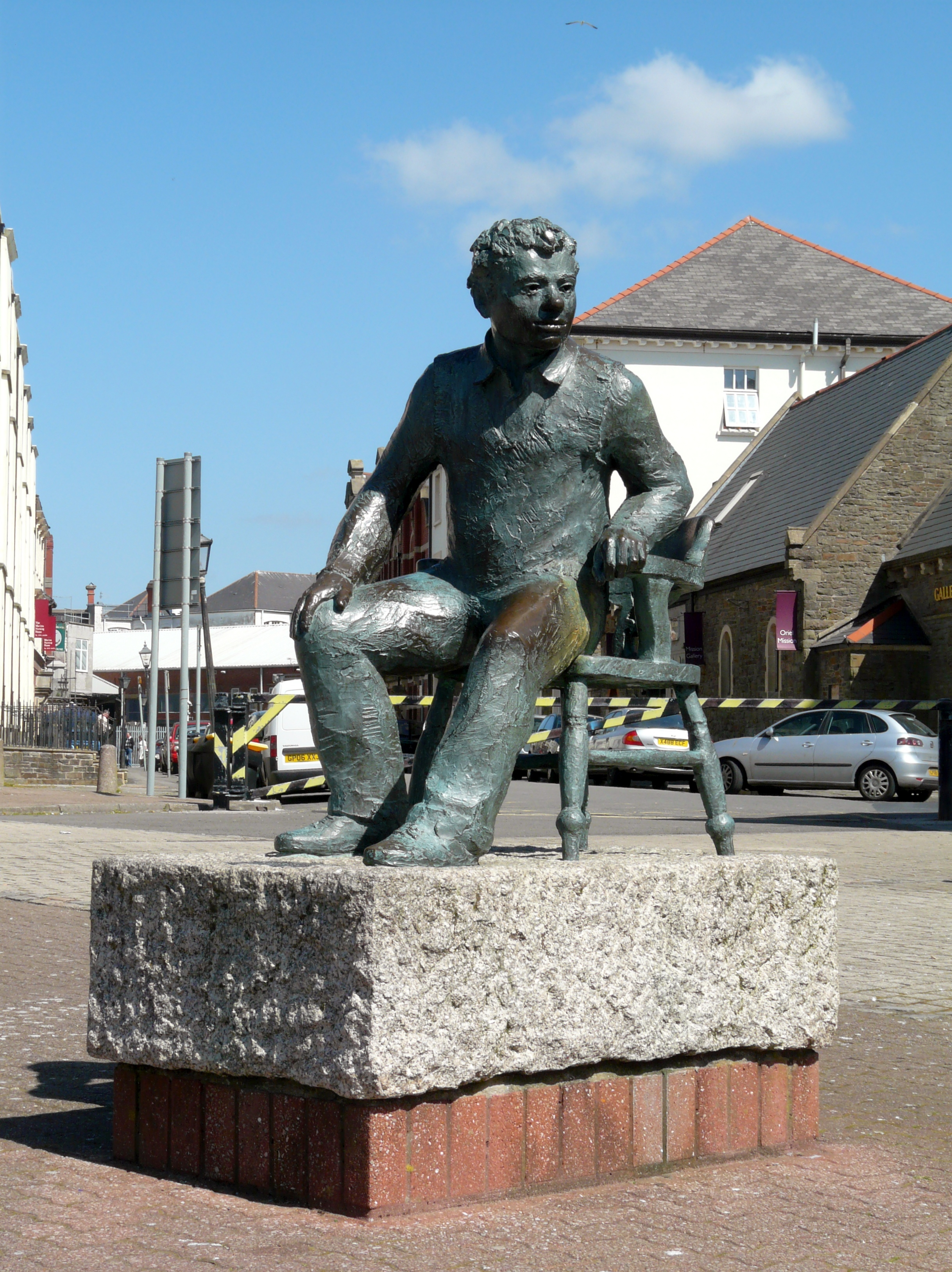
Statue of Dylan Thomas

- The poet Dylan Thomas is from Swansea. He was born in the town and grew up at 5 Cwmdonkin Drive, Uplands, where he lived for 23 years. He produced two-thirds of his published work from his bedroom, which has been recreated as it may have been in 1934; it is open for tours. There is a memorial to him in nearby Cwmdonkin Park. He described Swansea as an "ugly lovely town". In the 1930s, Thomas was a member of a group of local artists, writers and musicians known as The Kardomah Gang, which met in the Kardomah Café in Castle Street, until it was bombed in the Second World War. Other members with Swansea roots were the poet and journalist Charles Fisher, the poet Vernon Watkins, composer and linguist Daniel Jones, artists Alfred Janes and Mervyn Levy and the broadcaster Wynford Vaughan-Thomas.
- Throughout the 19th century, the Vivian family did much to develop Swansea. Their wealth and influence came from large copper-mining, smelting and trading businesses in Swansea (Vivian & Sons), and is still visible today in their former family residences: Singleton Abbey (now used by Swansea University), Sketty Hall, Clyne Castle and Clyne Gardens. Henry Vivian became the first Lord Swansea in 1893.
- Ernest Jones, psychoanalyst, colleague and official biographer of Sigmund Freud, was born in Gowerton and was educated at Swansea Grammar School.
- Rowan Williams, former Archbishop of Canterbury, was educated in Swansea at the state-sector Dynevor School before reading theology at Christ's College, Cambridge.
- The novelist and poet Kingsley Amis lectured in English at Swansea University from 1949 to 1961. His life and work in Swansea provided him with material for several of his novels, notably Lucky Jim and The Old Devils. His son, the novelist Martin Amis, grew up in Swansea and was a pupil at Bishop Gore School.
- Catherine Zeta-Jones was born and raised in Swansea and still owns a home at Limeslade Bay, Mumbles.
- Swansea is the home town of Non Stanford, the 2013 ITU Triathlon World Champion.
- The thriller writer, Mark Ellis, was educated in Swansea.
- Desmond Barrit, Swansea born (as Desmond Brown) actor and director.
- Doctor Who screenwriter Russell T Davies was born in Swansea, attending Olchfa School.
- Princess Lilian of Sweden, Duchess of Halland (1912–2013), married to His Royal Highness Prince Bertil of Sweden, Duke of Halland.
- Actor Matt Ryan (Assassin's Creed Black Flag/Constantine) is from Swansea.
- The comedian and actor Harry Secombe was born in the St Thomas district of Swansea.
- Singer/guitarist Pete Ham and singer/drummer Mike Gibbins, from the 1970s power pop band Badfinger, were both born in Swansea. There is a blue plaque for Ham in the city.
- Paul Grant, bodybuilder, featured in the documentary Pumping Iron.
- Evolutionary biologist Joseph Parker, recipient of the MacArthur Fellowship and professor at the California Institute of Technology, was born in Swansea.
- The American-born philosopher of Welsh descent Rush Rhees taught at Swansea University from 1940 to 1966 and is buried at Oystermouth Cemetery in Mumbles. He founded the "Swansea School" of philosophy which focussed on exploring and developing the work of Ludwig Wittgenstein. Rhees had formed a close friendship and collaborative relationship with Wittgenstein which led to the latter spending most of his holidays in Swansea between 1942 and 1947 ("It's good to be away from Cambridge ... among friendly people"). It was in Swansea in 1944 that he revised and completed his Philosophical Investigations.
- Harri Webb, Welsh nationalist poet and prominent member of Plaid Cymru, the Welsh Republican Movement (WRM) and Mudiad Amddiffyn Cymru (lit. 'movement for the defence of Wales'; MAC).
- Jack Jones lead singer and guitarist of Trampolene, poet and author, was born and raised in Swansea.

People from Swansea are known locally as "Swansea Jacks", or just "Jacks"; the source of this nickname is not clear. Some attribute it to Swansea Jack, the life-saving dog.

== Freedom of the City ==
The following people and military units have received the Freedom of the City of Swansea.

=== Individuals ===
- Admiral Lord Nelson: 14 August 1802.
- Sir William Hamilton: 14 August 1802.
- John Henry Vivian: 6 October 1834.
- William Ewart Gladstone: 26 May 1887.
- Field Marshal Sir Francis Grenfell: 11 October 1889.
- Sir Henry Morton Stanley: 16 July 1890.
- Lord Swansea: 20 July 1893.
- Sir John Jones Jenkins: 19 June 1895.
- Lord Rosebery: 29 November 1901.
- Sir Samuel Evans: 18 March 1908.
- Adelina Patti: 15 November 1911.
- Sir John Dillwyn-Llewellyn: 21 January 1914.
- David Davies: 21 January 1914.
- Roger Beck: 21 January 1914.
- John Dyer: 21 January 1914.
- David Lloyd George: 19 June 1918.
- Lord Haig : 17 May 1922.
- Alderman David Matthews: 15 July 1924.
- David Williams: 15 July 1924.
- Lord McGowan: 15 March 1939.
- William Owen: 15 March 1939.
- David John Davies: 15 March 1939.
- Sir Robert Menzies: 29 April 1941.
- Peter Fraser: 16 July 1941.
- Field Marshal Lord Montgomery of Alamein: 16 June 1948.
- David Grenfell: 18 February 1953.
- Daniel Evans: 18 February 1953.
- George William Peacock: 18 February 1953.
- Percy Morris: 19 February 1958.
- Lord Callaghan of Cardiff: 29 November 1993.
- Charles, Prince of Wales: 24 May 1994.
- President Jimmy Carter: 11 August 1995.
- Gerhard Widder of Mannheim: 18 November 1995.
- Donald Anderson}: 11 February 2000.
- John Charles: 4 March 2001.
- Rowan Williams: 31 July 2010.
- Mel Nurse: 28 April 2016.
- Chris Coleman: 20 October 2016.
- Sir Karl Jenkins: 4 October 2018.
- Alun Wyn Jones: 13 June 2019.
- Catherine Zeta-Jones: 24 July 2019.
- Kevin Johns: 8 December 2022.

=== Military units ===
- The Welsh Guards: 15 September 1948.
- The Welch Regiment: 17 February 1960.
- The Royal Monmouthshire Royal Engineers: 15 April 1978.
- The Royal Regiment of Wales: 20 February 1981.
- HMS Arethusa, RN: 27 June 1981.
- HM Coastguard (Swansea Station): 8 December 1982.
- The Mumbles Lifeboat Station, RNLI: 23 April 1987.
- The Royal Welch Fusiliers: 20 January 1994.
- HMS Scott, RN: 15 September 2006.
- The Royal Welsh: 13 September 2008.
- 215 (City of Swansea) Squadron Air Training Corps: 12 March 2016.
- HMS Cambria, RNR: 17 March 2018.
- 157 (Welsh) Regiment, RLC: 27 July 2019.

== See also ==
- Swansea Philharmonic Choir
