= List of public art in Swansea =

This is a list of public art in Swansea, Wales.

== Swansea City Centre ==
Image	Title / individual commemorated	Location	Date	Sculptor / Designer	Source	Coordinates
	Sir Henry Hussey Vivian	Adjacent to St. David's Shopping Centre	1886	Mario Raggi		51.619061°N 3.943763°W
	Orchard Street mural	Central Clinic, Orchard Street	1969	Harry Everington and Swansea College of Art students		
	Leaf Boat	Castle Square, Swansea City Centre	1996	Amber Hiscott		51°37′13.2″N 3°56′30″W
	Wall sculpture, quotingFern Hill by Dylan Thomas	8 Salubrious Passage, Swansea City Centre	c. 1996			51°37′7.5″N 3°56′25.9″W
	Poem for the Good Settler	Christina Street, Swansea City Centre	1997	Nigel Jenkins (poet)		
	Thumbprint	Swansea Central Police Station	2001	Andy Hazel		
	Stainless steel columns	Princess Way, Swansea City Centre	2006	David Mackie, Andrew Rowe and Heather Parnell		51°37′6.5″N 3°56′28.4″W
	Madonna and Child	Walkway between Tesco and St. David's Shopping Centre (Swansea)				51°37′4.2″N 3°56′33.2″W
	Wall Sculpture	Walkway between Tesco and St. David's Shopping Centre (Swansea)				51°37′4.2″N 3°56′33.3″W
	Wall Sculpture	Walkway between Tesco and St. David's Shopping Centre (Swansea)				51°37′4.2″N 3°56′33.3″W
	Swansea Blitz Memorial	Quay Parade Junction with New Cut Road	1995			51.621913°N 3.935925°W
	Flying Figurehead	Quay Parade, near Sainsbury's, SA1 Swansea Waterfront	1988	David Backhouse		51°37′17.62″N 3°56′8.72″W
	Ambition is Critical	Swansea railway station	1993	David Hughes (poet)		51.6253°N 3.9409°W

== Brynmill ==
Image	Title / individual commemorated	Location	Date	Sculptor / Designer	Source	Coordinates
	British Empire Panels	Brangwyn Hall, Swansea Guildhall	1932	Sir Frank Brangwyn		51°36′50.8″N 3°57′36.1″W
	William Thomas, Mayor of Borough 1877, 1878	Victoria Park, Brynmill, Swansea	1906	Ivor J. Thomas		51°36′45.6″N 3°57′47.4″W
	Boys' Brigade fountain	Victoria Park, Brynmill, Swansea	Reinaugurated 1987			51°36′45.2″N 3°57′42.7″W
	Memorial to the second of the Boer Wars 1899-02	Esplanade, Mumbles Road, Brynmill, Swansea	1904	Mr Littlejohn (designer)		51°36′41.2″N 3°57′59.8″W
	Swansea War Memorial	Esplanade, Mumbles Road Brynmill, Swansea	1923	Ernest E Morgan (after Edwin Lutyens’ Whitehall Cenotaph )		51°36′38.5″N 3°58′5.21″W
	Swansea Jack memorial	Esplanade, Mumbles Road, Brynmill, Swansea	1937	J. Cecil Jones		51°36′41.5″N 3°57′58.6″W
	Henry Evans Charles Memorial Fountain	Oystermouth Road, Brynmill, Swansea	1907	Ivor J Thomas, J. Cecil Jones		51°36′44.7″N 3°57′36.2″W

== Blackpill and Mumbles ==
Image	Title / individual commemorated	Location	Date	Sculptor / Designer	Source	Coordinates
	Musical Osprey – Leaving the Nest	Blackpill Lido, Swansea	1998	'Urban Strawberry Lunch'		51°35′46.7″N 3°59′40.7″W
	Painted National Cycle Network Millennium Milepost	Blackpill, Swansea	1998	Andrew Rowe (designer)		51°35′55.9″N 3°59′37.3″W
	War Memorial	Southend Park, Mumbles	1939 (plinths with names added 2006).			51°34′22.96″N 3°59′39.23″W
	Breathing at Sea	Southend Park, Mumbles	2000	Hideo Furuta		51°34′22.75″N 3°59′38.86″W
	Swansea Coat of Arms	Above entrance to Oystermouth Library, Dunns Lane, Mumbles	1935	E E Morgan (Architect)		51°34′29.15″N 3°59′56.87″W

== Maritime Quarter ==
Image	Title / individual commemorated	Location	Date	Sculptor / Designer	Source	Coordinates
	Copper Flame	Marine Walk, Maritime Quarter, Swansea	1988	Robin Campbell (designer), Martin Williams (sculptor), Andrew Rowe, Theo Grunewald (metal workers)		51°36′49″N 3°56′31″W
	Wall Sculptures	Marine Walk, Maritime Quarter, Swansea				51°36′49″N 3°56′30.8″W
	'Zeta Mnemonical', sculpture and weather vane	Marine Walk, Maritime Quarter, Swansea	c1985-90	Robin Campbell (designer), Andrew Rowe, Theo Grunewald (metal workers)		51°36′48.5″N 3°56′31.9″W
	Navigation buoy	Marine Walk, Maritime Quarter, Swansea				51°36′47.6″N 3°56′36″W
	The Siren	Seaward end of the Marriott Hotel, Maritime Quarter, Swansea	1989			51°36′47.8″N 3°56′38.42″W
	Globe Sundial sculpture	Marine Walk, Maritime Quarter, Swansea	1987	Wendy Taylor		51°36′50.2″N 3°56′25.5″W
	Lighthouse Tower sculpture	Marine Walk, Maritime Quarter, Swansea	1987	Robert Conybear		51°36′51″N 3°56′19.9″W
	Helwick Lightship. One of four wall sculptures featuring nautical history.	Marine Walk, walkway to Ocean Crescent, Maritime Quarter, Swansea	c1985–1990	Robin Campbell (designer), Philip Chatfield (sculptor)	see below	51°36′50.76″N 3°56′25.7″W
	The copper ore barque, Zeta. One of four wall sculptures featuring nautical history.	Marine Walk, walkway to Ocean Crescent, Maritime Quarter, Swansea	c1985–1990	Robin Campbell (designer), Philip Chatfield (sculptor)		51°36′51.6″N 3°56′19.4″W
	The Boatshed Doors	Marine Walk, close to the Marina Towers Observatory	c1985–1990	Robert Conybear, Robin Campbell		51°36′51.5″N 3°56′10.8″W
	'Ecliptica' sculpture and weather vane, Marina Towers Observatory	Sea promenade, Maritime Quarter, Swansea	1989 (building), 1991 (sculpture)	Robin Campbell (architect), Robert Conybear, Uta Molling (sculptors – 'Ecliptica' weather vane)		51°36′50.4″N 3°56′12″W
	Sculptures on the Marina Towers Observatory	Sea promenade, Maritime Quarter, Swansea	1989 (building)	Robin Campbell (architect)		51°36′50.61″N 3°56′12.99″W
	The Mermaid	Marine Walk, Maritime Quarter, Swansea	1989	Gordon Young		51°36′50.8″N 3°56′13.9″W
	'Baron' Spolasco, a quack doctor who lived in Swansea in the 1830s	Patagonia Walk, just off Trawler Road, Maritime Quarter, Swansea	c1985–1990	Robin Campbell, Richard Porch (designers), Jonah Jones, Meic Watts, Brian Denman (sculptors)		51°36′53.5″N 3°56′20.3″W
	Captain Cat from Under Milk Wood by Dylan Thomas	Abernethy Quay, Maritime Quarter, Swansea	1990	Robert J R Thomas (sculptor)		51°36′59.1″N 3°56′9.5″W
	Turbo Pharos wall sculpture	Maritime Quarter, Swansea				
	Mannheim Quay wall sculpture	Maritime Quarter, Swansea				51°37′2.4″N 3°56′6.7″W
	Pumphouse Quay wall sculpture	Next to the Pump House, Maritime Quarter, Swansea				51°37′0″N 3°56′10.3″W
	Dylan Thomas	Dylan Thomas Square, Maritime Quarter, Swansea	1984	John Doubleday		51°36′59.8″N 3°56′14″W
	Dylan Thomas Theatre wall sculpture and mural	West wall of Theatre, Dylan Thomas Square, Maritime Quarter, Swansea	c1979		(see below)	51°37′0.5″N 3°56′16.27″W
	Dylan Thomas Theatre mural, depicting scenes from Dylan Thomas's life.	Dylan Thomas Square, Maritime Quarter, Swansea	c1979			51°36′59.8″N 3°56′14″W
	History and development of steam railways	Victoria Quay, Maritime Quarter, Swansea	1983	Whitegates Ltd (Architects)		51°36′55.19″N 3°56′33.13″W
	John Henry Vivian M.P.	Ferrara Square, Maritime Quarter, Swansea	1857	John Evan Thomas		51°36′55.3″N 3°56′15.7″W
	Commemorating the twinning of Swansea with Ferrara, Italy	Ferrara Square, Maritime Quarter, Swansea				51.6154°N 3.937241°W
	Monument to twinning of Swansea with Mannheim, Germany	Near Cambrian Place, Maritime Quarter, Swansea	1985	R.Campbell (architect)		51°37′2.4″N 3°56′6.7″W
	Wall Sculpture	Pocketts Wharf, Maritime Quarter, Swansea	1993	Lovell Urban Renewal (architects)		51°37′2.67″N 3°55′59.91″W
	Wall Sculpture	Pocketts Wharf, Maritime Quarter, Swansea	1993	Lovell Urban Renewal (architects)		51°37′3.1″N 3°56′3.1″W
	Maudslay, Sons and Field, Marine Engines	Pocketts Wharf, Maritime Quarter, Swansea	1993	Lovell Urban Renewal (architects)		51°37′2.7″N 3°55′59.03″W
	Wall Sculpture	Pocketts Wharf, Maritime Quarter, Swansea	1993	Lovell Urban Renewal (architects)		51°37′3.1″N 3°56′3.1″W
	Wall mounted sculpture (one of two)	Pocketts Wharf, Maritime Quarter, Swansea	1993	Robin Campbell		51°37′2.66″N 3°55′59.05″W
	Door sculptures	Tawe barrage pump house, SA1 Swansea Waterfront, Swansea				51°37′7.1″N 3°55′52″W
	Merchant navy Memorial	Technium Square, SA1 Swansea Waterfront, Swansea	2005	Philip Chatfield		51°37′13.4″N 3°55′54.7″W
	Riverside sculpture	By River Tawe, outside Sainsbury's, SA1 Swansea Waterfront				51°37′11.9″N 3°56′3.9″W
	Light Wave	Crescent Park, Swansea Point, Swansea	2009	Peter Freeman		51°36′54.7″N 3°55′58.3″W
	Acoustic Sculpture 1	Swansea Point, Swansea	2009	Rob Olins		51°36′53.28″N 3°55′58.25″W
	Acoustic Sculpture 2	Swansea Point, Swansea	2009	Rob Olins		51°36′52.4″N 3°56′4.5″W
	Kinetic Monument (an example of Kinetic Sculpture)	Outside the LC, Swansea, Oystermouth Road, Swansea	1977	Kenneth Martin		51°37′0.5″N 3°56′22.6″W

== Morriston ==
Image	Title / individual commemorated	Location	Date	Sculptor / Designer	Source	Coordinates
	Poetry Benches	Morriston Hospital, Morriston	2015	David Jones (artist), Menna Elfyn (poet), David Hughes (poet), Nigel Jenkins (poet) & Rhys Owain Williams (poet)		51°35′46.7″N 3°59′40.7″W
	Poetry Boards	Morriston Hospital, Morriston	2015	David Jones (artist), Menna Elfyn (poet), David Hughes (poet), Nigel Jenkins (poet) & Rhys Owain Williams (poet)		51°35′46.7″N 3°59′40.7″W

== Uplands ==
Image	Title / individual commemorated	Location	Date	Sculptor / Designer	Source	Coordinates
	Dylan Thomas Memorial Stone	Cwmdonkin Park, Uplands	1963	Dylan Thomas (poet), Ronald Cour (sculptor)		
