= 1897 Edinburgh Corporation election =

Local election in Scotland

An Election to the Edinburgh Corporation was held on 2 November 1897, alongside municipal elections across Scotland, and the wider British local elections. Contests took place in 5 of the cities’ 13 wards, with candidates in the remaining 8 being returned unopposed. Three Portobello wards also held elections. The election was relatively quiet, with no particularly important issues being raised. As a result, the main focus of the election was on the Lord Provost and the personalities of the individual candidates.

The Liberal Sir Mitchell Mitchell-Thomson, 1st Baronet took over as Provost following the election, replacing the Unionist Sir Andrew McDonald.

== Aggregate results ==
Edinburgh Corporation election, 1897 (Contested seats)
| Party | Seats | Gains | Losses | Net gain/loss | Seats % | Votes % | Votes | +/− |
|---|---|---|---|---|---|---|---|---|
| Unionist | 5 | | | | | | | |
| Liberal | 2 | | | | | | | |
| Radical | 1 | | | | | | | |

== Ward results ==
Results by ward.

Newington
| Party | Candidate | Votes | % | ±% |
|---|---|---|---|---|
| Unionist | John Harrison | 2,431 | | |
| Liberal | Mr Macpherson | 2,254 | | |
| Majority | | 177 | | |
| Turnout | | 4,685 | | |
| Unionist hold | | Swing | | |

St. Leonard's
| Party | Candidate | Votes | % | ±% |
|---|---|---|---|---|
| Liberal | Robert Menzies | 1,776 | | |
| Socialist | William Gall | 467 | | |
| Majority | | 1,309 | | |
| Turnout | | 2,243 | | |
| Liberal hold | | Swing | | |

Broughton
| Party | Candidate | Votes | % | ±% |
|---|---|---|---|---|
| Radical | Hugh M. Michael | 1,108 | | |
| Unionist | James M. Anderson | 664 | | |
| Majority | | 444 | | |
| Turnout | | 1,772 | | |
| Radical hold | | Swing | | |

Canongate
| Party | Candidate | Votes | % | ±% |
|---|---|---|---|---|
| Unionist | Councillor Gubie | 1,116 | | |
| Social Democratic Federation | George Doull | 636 | | |
| Majority | | 480 | | |
| Turnout | | 1,752 | | |
| Unionist hold | | Swing | | |

St. George's
| Party | Candidate | Votes | % | ±% |
|---|---|---|---|---|
| Unionist | David Purves | 1,800 | | |
| Liberal | Councillor Scott | 1,519 | | |
| Majority | | 281 | | N/A |
| Turnout | | 3,319 | | |
| Unionist gain from Liberal | | Swing | | |

Portobello: 14th
| Party | Candidate | Votes | % | ±% |
|---|---|---|---|---|
| Unionist | W. Gray | 306 | | |
| Liberal | Alexander Tod | 133 | | |
| Majority | | 173 | | |
| Turnout | | 439 | | |
| Unionist hold | | Swing | | |

Portobello: 15th
| Party | Candidate | Votes | % | ±% |
|---|---|---|---|---|
| Liberal | Bailie Brand | 274 | | |
| Unionist | J. L. B. Higgin | 179 | | |
| Majority | | 95 | | |
| Turnout | | 453 | | |
| Liberal hold | | Swing | | |

Portobello: 16th
| Party | Candidate | Votes | % | ±% |
|---|---|---|---|---|
| Unionist | Robert Innes | 209 | | |
| Unionist | James Watson | 151 | | |
| Majority | | 58 | | |
| Turnout | | 360 | | |
| Unionist hold | | Swing | | |
