= Maritime Quarter, Swansea =

Neighbourhood in Swansea, Wales

Coordinates: 51.615°N 3.940°W

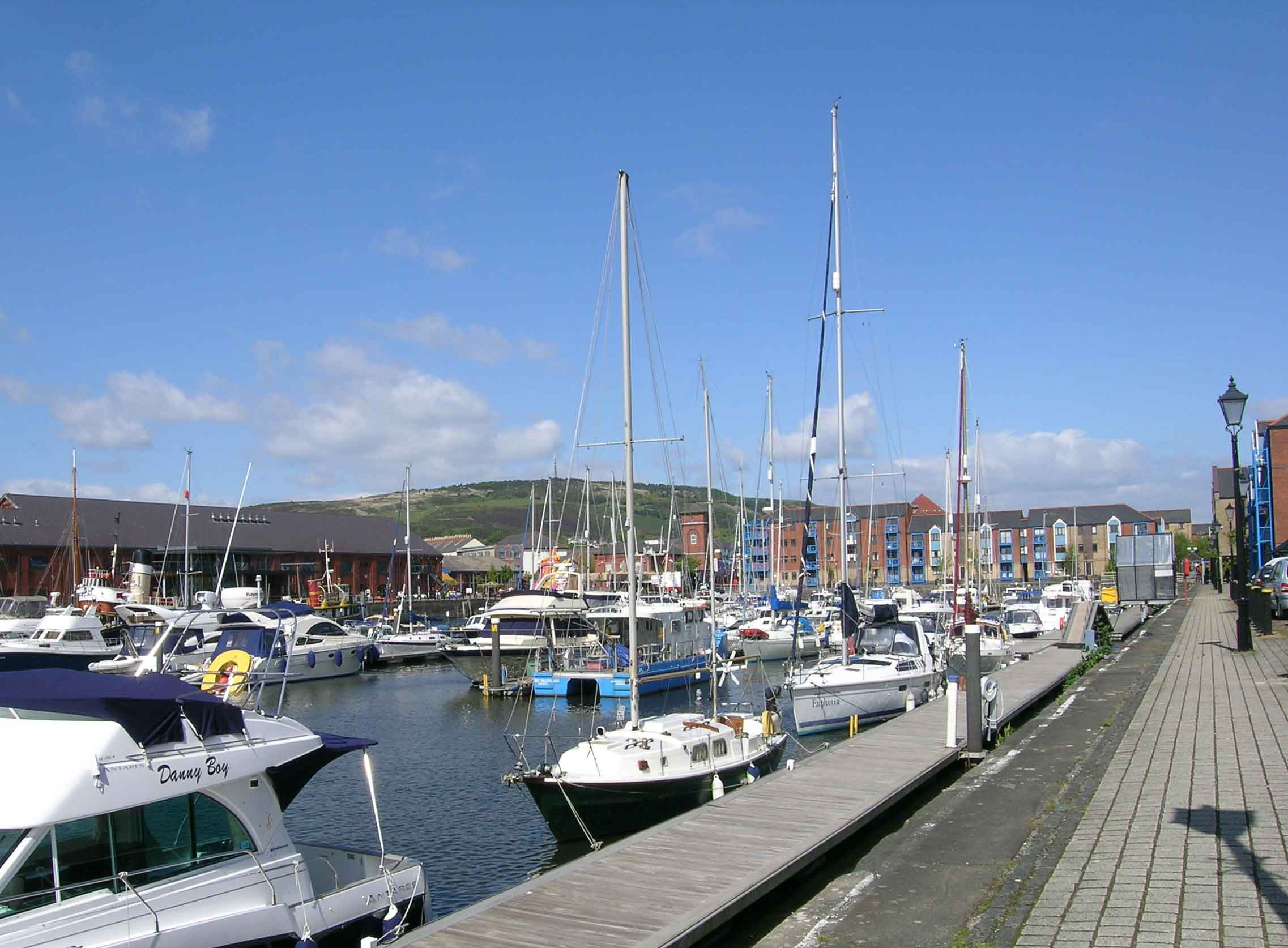
Former South Dock

The Maritime Quarter (including Swansea Marina) is a residential area of Swansea, Wales, immediately south of the city centre shopping core. It falls within Swansea's Castle ward. The area is bounded by Brynmill to the west, Swansea Bay to the South, the River Tawe to the east and the A4067 to the north.

The area comprises a mixture of housing ranging from 1980s low-rise apartment blocks around the old South Dock to town houses arranged in quadrangles in the south-eastern part of the area, which were built in the 2000s decade. Planning approval for the marina was given on condition that a significant proportion of the development be sold to housing associations for social housing. The tallest building in Wales, the Meridian Quay Tower, is in the area.

== History ==
The South Dock area underwent significant brownfield re-development in the early 1980s, with the building of many low-rise apartment blocks around the former dock. On the site of the Sainsbury's superstore, once stood the six-storey Weaver building. Built in 1897 by the French architect François Hennebique, it was used for corn storage and was the first steel reinforced concrete building built in Europe.

Originally the city council decided to fill in the South Dock. This was done by a developer whose brother was a councillor at the local council. Later on, the same company was paid to dig out the South Dock again to create the marina. The developer is now imprisoned in Swansea Prison.

The re-excavated South Dock was laid out into the award-winning Maritime Quarter by architect Robin Campbell, then head of Environmental Design at Swansea Council. The brief was to make the area an extension of Swansea city centre, and not a separate suburb, and to create walkways through the overall development being created by several building companies. However, due to the busy thoroughfare of Quay Parade/Oystermouth Road, the Marina area remains separate from the city centre. Campbell also worked in partnership with the developers to incorporate art designed by local artists into the buildings, and the creation of an observatory.

== Marina ==
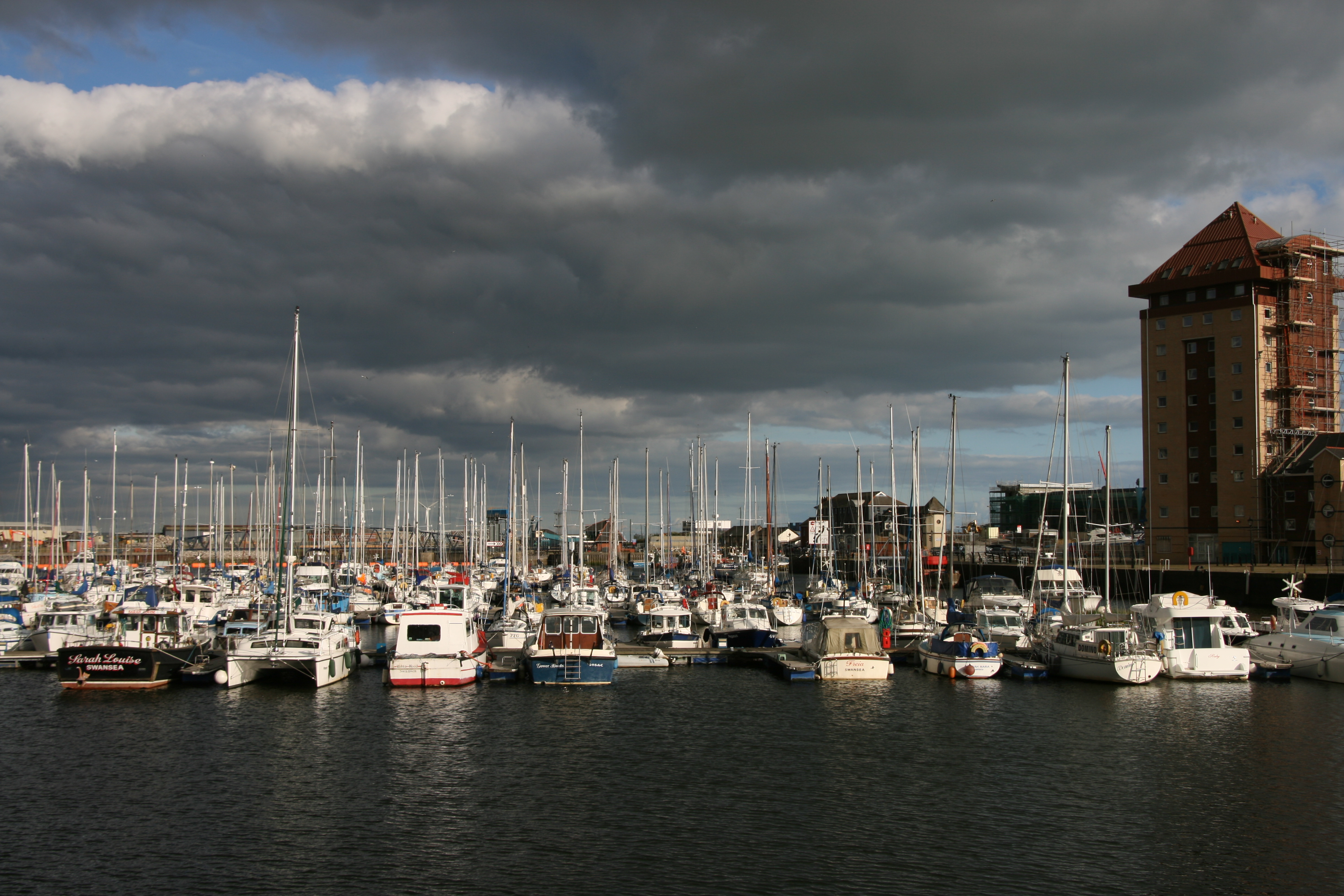
New marina just behind the River Tawe barrage

The South Dock itself now serves as marina, part of the Swansea Marina complex providing berths for privately owned leisure boats. Sailing and sea angling schools are based in the area.

In addition to the Quay Parade road bridge just to the north, two pedestrian bridges link this area to the main Swansea docks area – the Sail bridge and the lock bridge. The Sail bridge, as its name suggests, is designed to look like a sail. The lock bridge is a steel structure built over the Tawe barrage. The western section of the lock bridge is a swing bridge over the lock which allows vessels to pass through the Tawe barrage.

The water areas are not fully protected by railings. Local residents have often expressed concerns over the safety of the lack of railings and indeed, over the years, the marina has seen a number of people drown after falling into the waters by accident.

== Amenities ==
The headquarters of the local South Wales Evening Post newspaper is here. Beside the Evening Post building is the Associated British Ports building, now used as a five-star hotel. Just west of the marina is a four-star Marriott hotel. A waterside walkway to the north-east of the marina is home to a few cafes, pubs and arcades. On the far western end of the Maritime Quarter is the Civic Centre which houses government offices of the City and County of Swansea Council.

Within the area are:

- National Waterfront Museum
- Mission Gallery
- Dylan Thomas Centre
- Dylan Thomas Theatre
- Swansea Museum
- Swansea Leisure Centre
- Marina Towers Observatory
- The Environment Centre
- The Tower, Meridian Quay

The square surrounded by the National Waterfront Museum, the old Pump House and shopping area contains a statue of Dylan Thomas.

== Nearby places ==
- Swansea beach
- Swansea City Centre
- Sandfields
- Swansea docks
- SA1 Swansea Waterfront

== Gallery ==
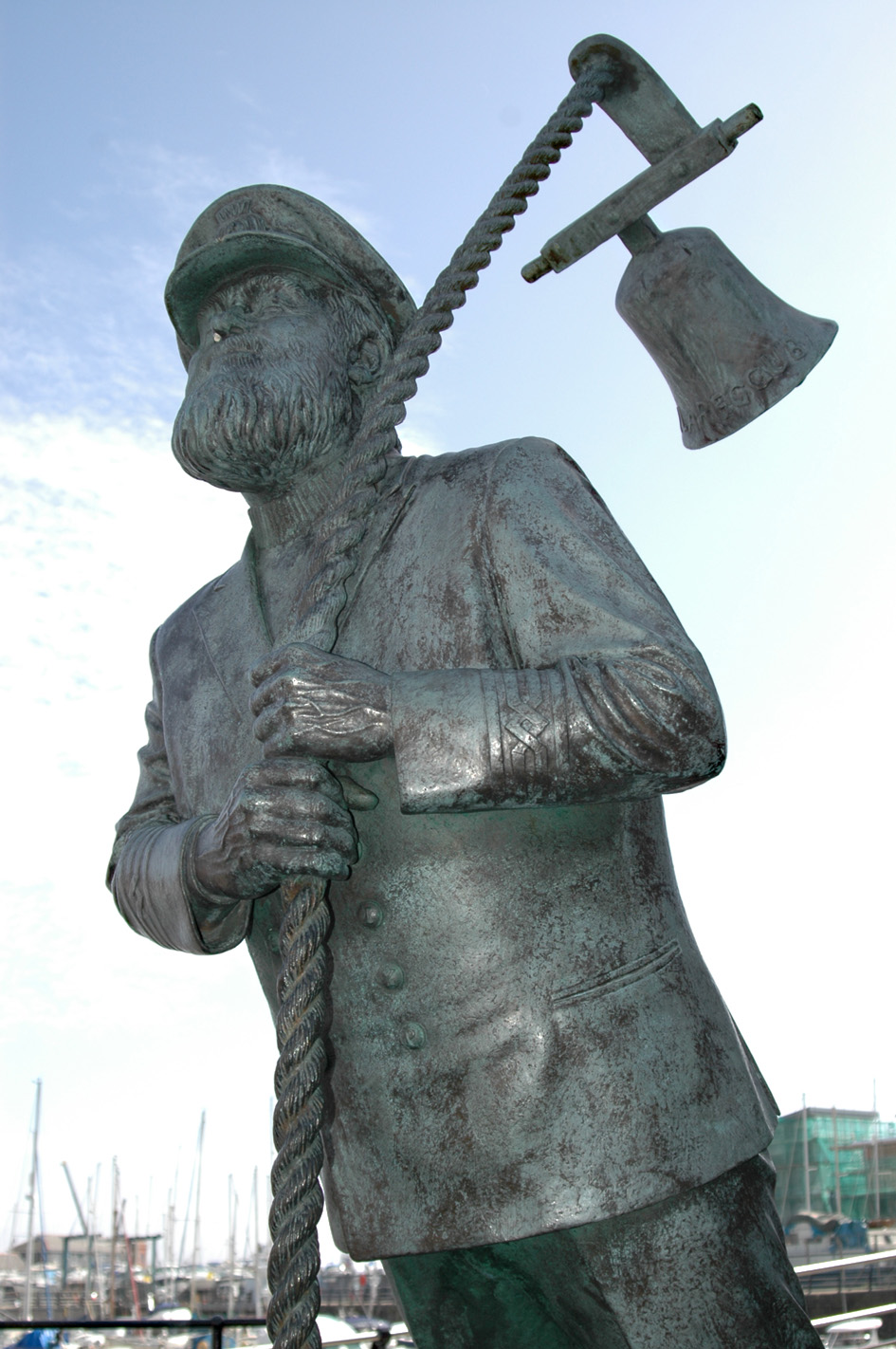
Statue of fictional Captain Cat

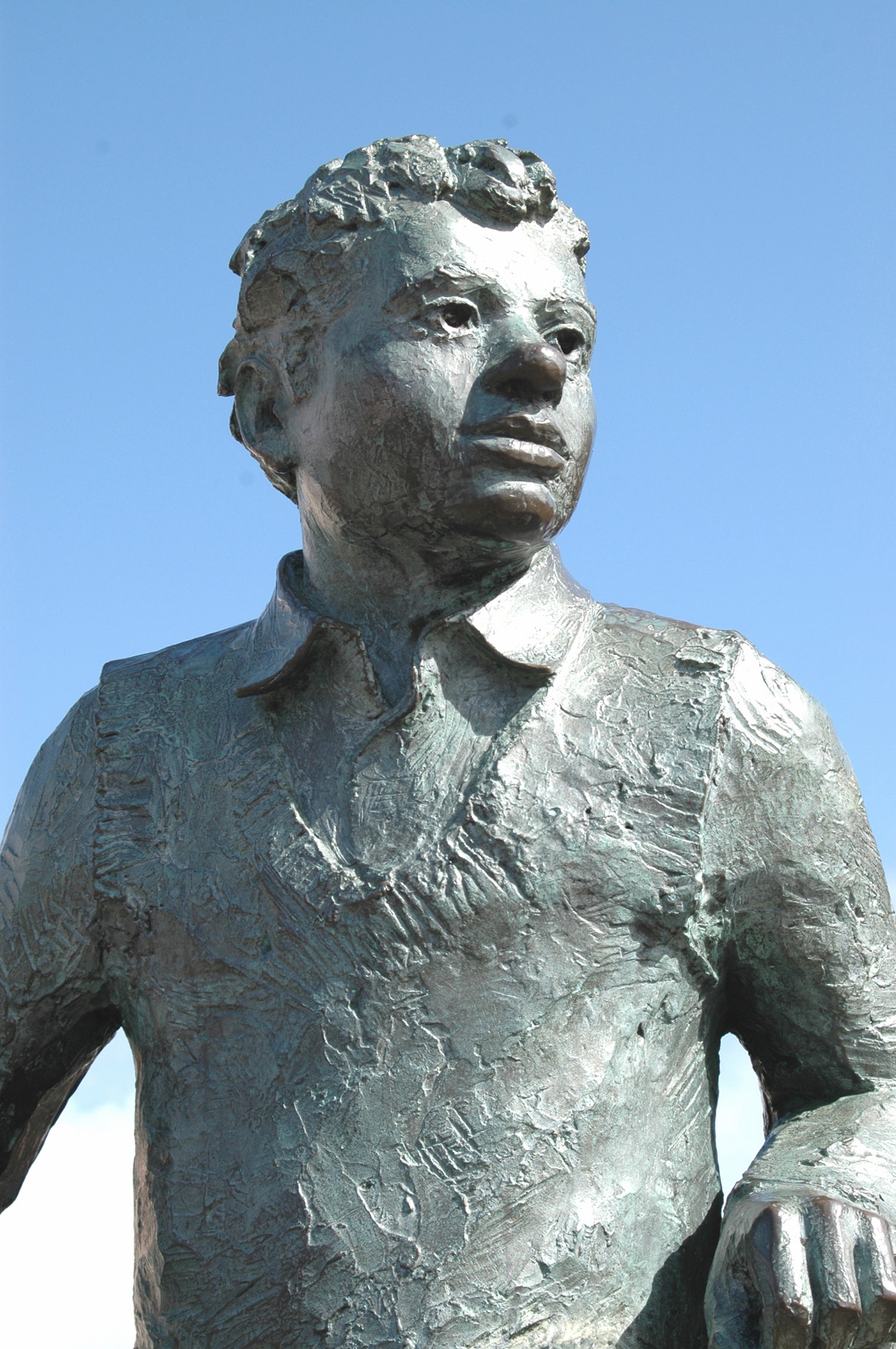
Statue of Dylan Thomas near the National Waterfront Museum

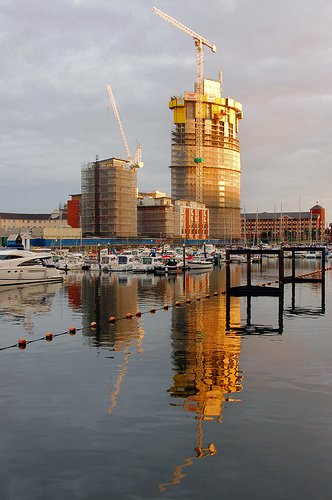
Meridian Quay under construction in 2008

== See also ==
- List of places in Swansea
- List of public art in Swansea
- Lower Swansea valley
