= 1897 in the United Kingdom =

Events from the year 1897 in the United Kingdom. This year was the Diamond Jubilee of Queen Victoria.

== Incumbents ==
- Monarch – Victoria
- Prime Minister – Robert Gascoyne-Cecil, 3rd Marquess of Salisbury (Coalition)

== Events ==
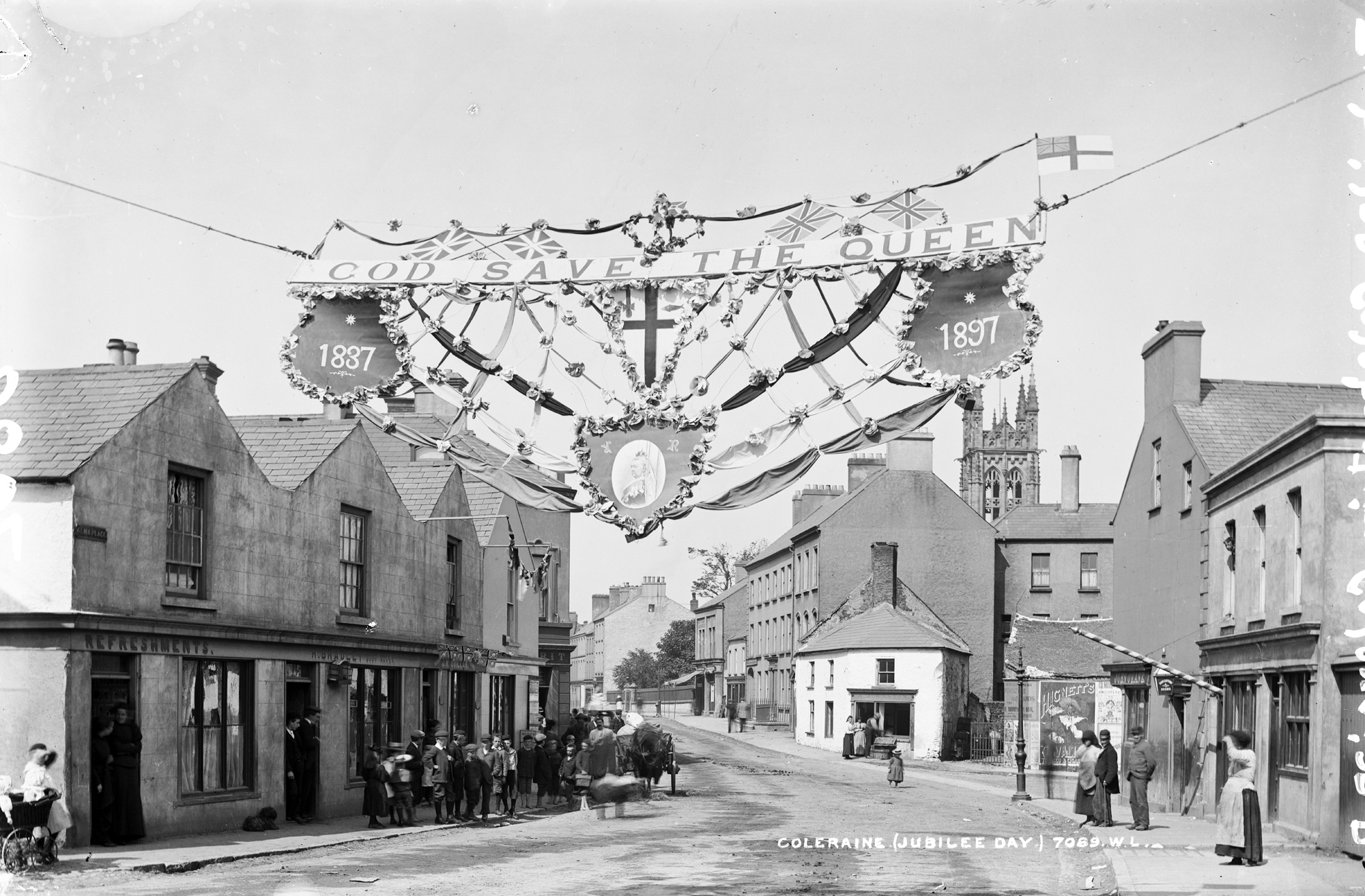
Display in celebration of the Diamond Jubilee of Queen Victoria in Coleraine (Ulster)

- 4 January – a British force is ambushed by Chief Ologbosere, son-in-law of the Oba of Benin, leading to a punitive expedition against Benin.
- 8 January – Frederick Temple is enthroned as Archbishop of Canterbury.
- February – Barrow's Cliff near Tintagel in north Cornwall is donated to the National Trust for Places of Historic Interest or Natural Beauty, its first coastal property.
- 18 February – Benin is put to the torch by the British Army's Benin Expedition. The Benin Bronzes are carried back to London.
- 29 March – Church of England encyclical replies to the Papal Apostolicae Curiae (1896) defending the validity of Anglican orders.
- 8 April – Voluntary Schools Act provides voluntary elementary schools with annual Exchequer grants of up to five shillings per child annually and exempts the schools from paying rates.
- 10 April – Aston Villa F.C. win the FA Cup with a 3–2 win over Everton in the final at Crystal Palace. Having already sealed the Football League title, they have completed the double.
- 17 April – double winners Aston Villa move into their new stadium, Villa Park in Birmingham.
- 30 April – J. J. Thomson first announces his discovery of the electron.
- 10 May – the Blue Cross animal welfare charity is founded as Our Dumb Friends League in London, a "society for the encouragement of kindness to animals".
- 13 May – Guglielmo Marconi sends his first wireless communication over open sea when the message "Are you ready" is transmitted across the Bristol Channel from Lavernock Point in South Wales to Flat Holm Island, a distance of 3.7 miles (6.0 km).
- 19 May – Anglo-Irish writer Oscar Wilde is released from prison and goes into exile on the Continent.
- 22 May – the Blackwall Tunnel, at this time the longest underwater road tunnel in the world, is opened for traffic beneath the River Thames in the East End of London by the Prince of Wales.
- 22 June – Queen Victoria celebrates her accession to the throne in 1837 with her Diamond Jubilee celebrations, centred on London but with beacons lit across the country.
- 26 June – at the Diamond Jubilee Fleet Review at Spithead, Charles Parsons gives an audacious unscheduled display before the world's navies of the unprecedented speed attainable by his steam turbine-powered Turbinia.
- July
  - The recently formed Engineering Employers' Federation stages a lockout of its employees across the north of England and Scotland; continues to January 1898.
  - Sir Benjamin Stone establishes the National Photographic Record Association.
- 1 July – Workmen's Compensation Act introduces a form of no-fault workman's compensation in dangerous trades.
- 2 July – Yorkshire Dialect Society founded, the oldest such society in England.
- 21 July – the Tate Gallery opens in London.
- 26 July–2 August – Siege of Malakand: British troops are besieged by Pashtun tribesmen in Malakand.
- 10 August – the Automobile Club of Great Britain (later known as the Royal Automobile Club) is founded in London.
- 19 August – Bersey electric cabs, the first horseless taxicabs, begin operating in London.
- 20 August
  - Physician Ronald Ross discovers malarial parasites.
  - First post-Reformation Roman Catholic pilgrimage to Walsingham.
- 8 September – Galtee More completes the English Triple Crown by finishing first in the Epsom Derby, 2,000 Guineas and St Leger.
- 10 September – first conviction for drink-driving given, to London taxi driver George Smith.
- 11 September – Maidstone typhoid epidemic breaks out. Continuing to 29 January 1898, this is the largest typhoid epidemic experienced in the UK, with more than 1000 people infected and at least 132 deaths.
- 12 September – Battle of Saragarhi: 21 Sikhs from the 36th Sikhs regiment of the British Indian Army battle 10,000 Afghans to the death.
- 13 October – HMS Canopus, a pre-dreadnought battleship of the Royal Navy, is launched at Portsmouth; she will be deployed widely in World War I.
- 16 November – Salomon v A Salomon & Co Ltd, a landmark case in United Kingdom company law, is decided in the House of Lords: creditors of an insolvent company cannot not sue the company's shareholders individually to pay up outstanding debts.
- 16 December – 50-year-old actor William Terriss is stabbed to death outside the Adelphi Theatre in London by a deranged unsuccessful actor, Richard Archer Prince.

=== Undated ===
- General Post Office 'Jubilee concession': free postal delivery granted to every household.
- The Weaver building, a mill at Swansea, becomes the first building in the UK to be constructed from reinforced concrete, by L. G. Mouchel to Hennebique patents.
- Physical education teacher Mary Tait invents the gymslip.
- Jaques of London patent the board game Ludo.
- The Ayrshire Yeomanry Cavalry adopts the sub-title Earl of Carrick's Own, in honour of the future King Edward VII.

== Publications ==
- The magazine Country Life is first published (8 January).
- Hall Caine's novel The Christian, first in Britain to sell over a million.
- Joseph Conrad's novella The Nigger of the 'Narcissus'.
- Henry James' novels The Spoils of Poynton and What Maisie Knew.
- Rudyard Kipling's novel Captains Courageous and poem "Recessional".
- W. Somerset Maugham's novel Liza of Lambeth.
- Henry Newbolt's ballads Admirals All, including "Vitaï Lampada" and "Drake's Drum".
- Bram Stoker's novel Dracula.
- H. G. Wells' novel The Invisible Man and short story "The Crystal Egg".

== Births ==
- 8 January – Dennis Wheatley, writer (died 1977)
- 25 February – Peter Llewelyn Davies, soldier and publisher (died 1960)
- 27 February – Edgar Henry Banger, cartoonist (died 1968)
- 15 March – Albert "Smiler" Marshall, World War I cavalryman (died 2005)
- 25 March – John Laurie, actor (died 1980)
- 26 March – David McCallum, Sr., violinist (died 1972)
- 14 April – Barbara Wootton, sociologist (died 1988)
- 16 April – John Bagot Glubb, soldier and author (died 1986)
- 27 May – John Cockcroft, physicist (died 1967)
- 12 June
  - Anthony Eden, Prime Minister (died 1977)
  - Léon Goossens, oboist (died 1988)
- 22 June – Robert Blucke, Royal Air Force officer (died 1988)
- 15 July
  - Letitia Chitty, aeronautical engineer (died 1982)
  - R. J. Yeatman, humorist (died 1968)
- 28 July – Kingsley Martin, political editor (died 1969)
- 29 July – Neil Ritchie, general (died 1983)
- 11 August – Enid Blyton, children's writer (died 1968)
- 1 September – Andy Kennedy, footballer (died 1963)
- 3 September – Cecil Parker (Schwabe), film actor (died 1971)
- 1 November – Naomi Mitchison, novelist (died 1999)
- 9 November – Ronald Norrish, chemist, Nobel Prize laureate (died 1978)
- 15 November
  - Aneurin Bevan, politician (died 1960)
  - Sacheverell Sitwell, writer (died 1988)
- 18 November – Derek McCulloch ("Uncle Mac"), presenter for BBC children's programmes (died 1967)
- 9 December – Hermione Gingold, actress (died 1987 in the United States)

== Deaths ==
- 22 January – Sir Isaac Pitman, inventor of Pitman Shorthand (born 1813)
- 15 March – James Joseph Sylvester, mathematician (born 1814)
- 19 June – Charles Boycott, land agent, origin of the word "boycott" (born 1832)
- 21 July – A. J. Mundella, hosiery manufacturer and reforming Liberal politician (born 1825)
- 19 August – George Palmer, biscuit manufacturer (born 1818)
- 28 August – John Braxton Hicks, obstetrician (born 1823)
- 15 October – Charles Vaughan, scholar and churchman (born 1816)
- 27 October – Princess Mary Adelaide of Cambridge (Duchess of Teck), member of the royal family (born 1833)
- 16 December – William Terriss, actor (born 1847; murdered)

== See also ==
- List of British films before 1920
