= Undercurrents (news) =

Alternative news organization

Undercurrents is an alternative video news network which began with the UK distribution of videotapes shot by volunteers. It has since expanded to include a web presence, media training for volunteers, and a film festival, BeyondTV.

== History ==
Undercurrents is an alternative news agency which came into being in 1994 with a VHS videocassette of news which the founders (Jamie Hartzell, Paul O'Connor, Zoe Broughton, and Thomas Harding) felt were not being addressed by the mainstream media. One of the issues covered was the introduction of the Criminal Justice Bill, whose varied measures included attempts to curtail large gatherings both of travelers and raves and make direct action protest a criminal offence. A second video compilation was released before the end of the year. Bands such as the Levellers included Undercurrents references on their CD sleeves. Radiohead have donated funds and comedian Mark Thomas allowed undercurrents to produce and distribute his first DVD to raise funds. Undercurrents was amongst the first groups which coined the phrase 'video activism'- the use of camcorders for social change. A co-founder, Thomas Harding, wrote The Video Activist Handbook published by Pluto Press. Undercurrents now distribute films via DVD and in 2009 they launched visionOntv - a peer-to-peer TV channel over the internet.

Many of the video activists who worked at Undercurrents went on to work at Oxford Channel including Roddy Mansfield, Jason Torrance, Thomas Harding, and Debora Harding. But they found that local TV was not the way forward and Undercurrents continued to distribute via DVD and community screenings. In 2009 they launched The Sol Cinema a micro touring cinema powered by lithium batteries and designed by Jo Furlong.

Celebrating the tenth anniversary of both Undercurrents and SchNEWS in 2004, writer and activist George Monbiot wrote,

"There are plenty of alternative media in Europe, but I've yet to come across any which are as informative and entertaining as these. If ever I forget why I'm an activist, Undercurrents and Schnews are there to remind me. […] Whenever I've seen a copy of Undercurrents, I feel my head's going to explode with inspiration and new ideas".

Undercurrents has won a number of awards including Digital Hero awards 2011, as well as film festivals in Germany, Tokyo, France, USA, UK, and the Czech republic.

== Status ==
Undercurrents subsequently became a non-profit company and a registered charity. Having previously moved their office from London to Oxford, they are now based in The Environment Centre in Swansea.

== Court Cases ==
Some of their footage of political protests has been used in court cases, including footage of the Genoa G8 summit, and a police raid on indymedia work spaces.

== Current projects ==
In 2006, Undercurrents was chosen as The Guardian's campaign of the week. The article stated that Undercurrents' "most successful piece is probably Evolving Minds, a film by Melissa Gunasena about dealing with mental health problems". The following year, Undercurrents released EcoVillage Pioneers- a documentary exploring sustainable low-impact communities around the world.

Many of their latest videos are hosted on YouTube. Undercurrents have also embarked upon a new project for distributing activists' videos.

Undercurrents are currently producing video podcasts about environmental issues such as climate change. Online video series include On the Push- Surfing and Climate change, A-Z of Bushcraft & Survival, Roundwood Timber Frame building, and Living in the Future- Ecovillages.
