= 1897 in Scotland =

- Centuries: 17th; 18th; 19th; 20th; 21st
- Decades: 1870s; 1880s; 1890s; 1900s; 1910s
- See also: List of years in Scotland; Timeline of Scottish history 1897 in: The UK • Wales • Elsewhere; Scottish football: 1896–97 • 1897–98

Events from the year 1897 in Scotland.

== Incumbents ==
- Secretary for Scotland and Keeper of the Great Seal – Lord Balfour of Burleigh

=== Law officers ===
- Lord Advocate – Andrew Murray
- Solicitor General for Scotland – Charles Dickson

=== Judiciary ===
- Lord President of the Court of Session and Lord Justice General – Lord Robertson
- Lord Justice Clerk – Lord Kingsburgh

== Events ==
- 25 March – formation of the Scottish Trades Union Congress.
- 1 May – all the able-bodied men of Pabbay, Barra Isles, are lost in a storm while out fishing.
- 20 August – Ronald Ross, who is to become the first Scot to win a Nobel prize (in 1902), discovers the malaria Plasmodium in dissecting an Anopheles mosquito, demonstrating the transmission mechanism for the disease.
- 2 November – the Highland Railway's Dingwall and Skye Railway is opened from Stromeferry to a new west coast terminus at Kyle of Lochalsh railway station.
- Congested Districts Board (Scotland) set up by the government to administer grants for the development of agriculture, fishing and cottage industries in Highlands and Islands areas where existing resources are inadequate for support of the population.
- McEwan Hall, University of Edinburgh (architect: Robert Rowand Anderson) completed.
- Construction of McCaig's Tower at Oban commences.
- Construction of Kinloch Castle on the isle of Rùm for English playboy George Bullough commences.
- The Royal and Ancient Golf Club of St Andrews' Rules of Golf Committee is appointed and issues its first rules of golf.
- Partick Thistle F.C. are promoted to Scottish Football League Division One and establish their home ground at Meadowside.

== Births ==
- 9 February – James Stuart, Unionist politician, Secretary of State for Scotland (died 1971)
- 18 February – Kathleen Garscadden, children's radio presenter (died 1991)
- 25 March – John Laurie, actor (died 1980)
- 23 May – Jimmie Guthrie, motorcycle racer (died in racing accident 1937 in Germany)
- 6 June – Jane Haining, Church of Scotland missionary (died 1944 in Auschwitz concentration camp)
- 17 September – Isaac Wolfson, businessman (died 1991 in Israel)
- 1 November – Naomi Mitchison, novelist (died 1999)
- 25 November – Helen Duncan, née MacFarlane, medium (died 1956)

== Deaths ==
- 11 March – Henry Drummond, evangelist (born 1851)
- 19 July – Sir John Skelton, lawyer, author and administrator (born 1831)
- 24 October – William Gardner, soldier, recipient of the Victoria Cross (born 1821)

== See also ==
- Timeline of Scottish history
- 1897 in Ireland
