= David Hughes (poet, born 1947) =

Welsh writer

- Born: 1947 (age 78–79); Bargoed, Wales
- Occupation: Writer
- Writing career
- Genre: Poetry

David Hughes (born 1947) is a Welsh writer. He is the originator of the phrase "ambition is critical", which was made famous by its appearance in the 1997 film Twin Town and has regularly been misattributed to fellow Swansea poet Dylan Thomas.

== Early life ==
David Hughes was born in Bargoed in the Rhymney Valley in 1947. For the first seven years of his life he lived in Breconshire, before his family moved to Mumbles in Swansea. He initially trained as a teacher and worked in London and the English Midlands before moving back to Swansea, where he still lives. In 1975, he switched careers to become a social worker, working in the Mental Health Services Department of the City and County of Swansea.

== Career ==
Hughes has released two full collections of poetry. The first was Tidy Boy, published by Swansea Poetry Workshop in 1998. Three poems from Tidy Boy ('Flowers', Tidy Boy' and 'The Streets of Llandeilo') would later be included in the anthology Poetry 1900–2000, which was published in the Library of Wales series to show the development of Welsh poetry in English during the 20th century. Hughes' second collection, Working Out, was published by Parthian in 2021.

Both of Hughes' collections contain a number of poems written in the local dialect of Swansea, a technique he has become well-known for. In 2021 his contribution to this subgenre of poetry was celebrated in the BBC Radio 4 programme Tongue and Talk: The Dialect Poets, with presenter Rakie Ayola featuring him alongside other Welsh poets who write in their local dialects. In 2023, Hughes' dialect poetry was performed as part of a special celebration of his work by actors Christian Patterson, Sophie Melville, Lisa Zahra, Richard Mylan and Lee Mengo. The charity event saw the actors read the poems as dramatic monologues, exploring character, memory and Welsh identity.

In addition to the contemporary monologues of his dialect poetry, Hughes has also created historical monologues as part of the Catch the Echoes project. These commissions can be heard via a QR code trail at Margam Country Park and along parts of the River Tawe.

=== Ambition is Critical ===
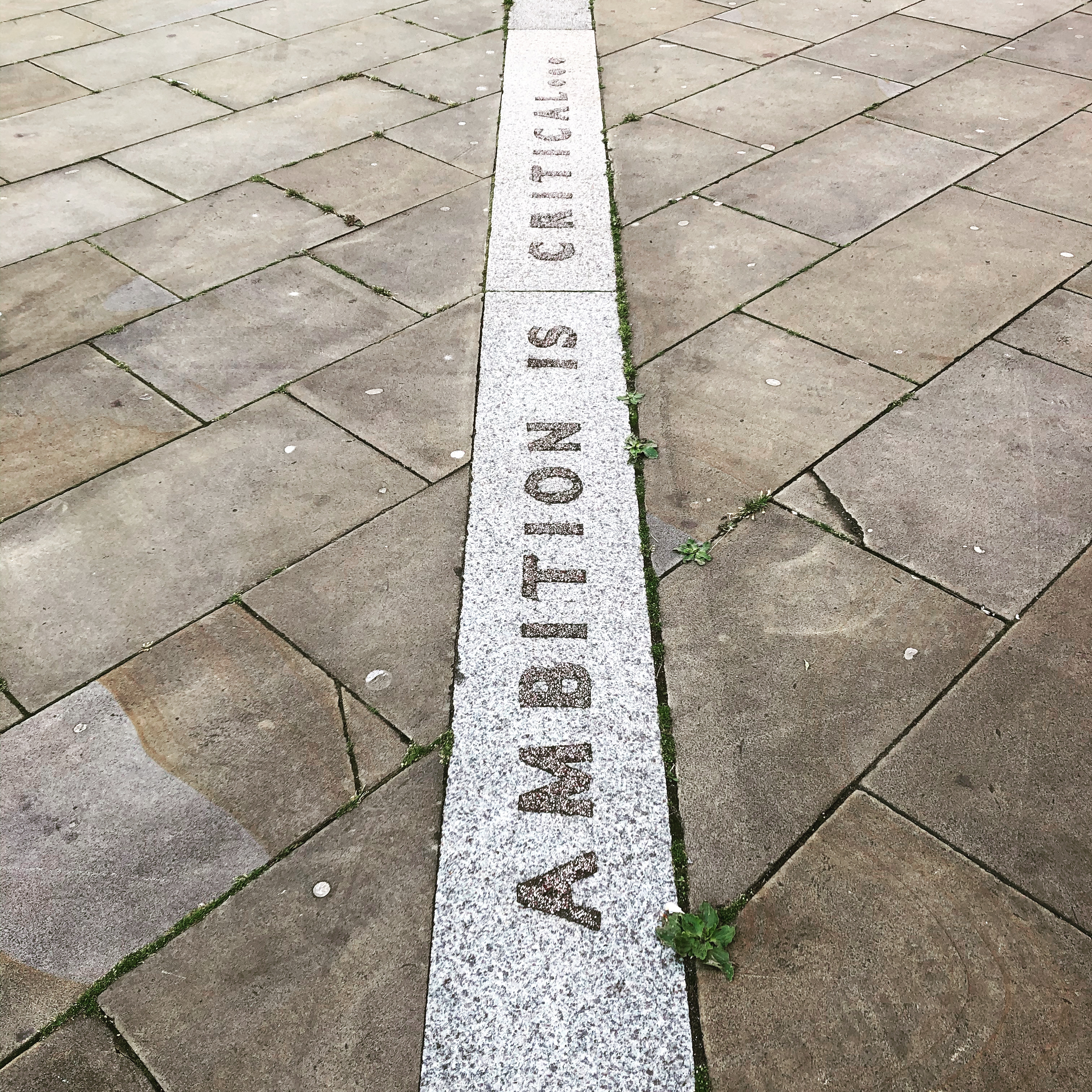
The words "Ambition is critical..." embedded into the pavement outside Swansea railway station.

Hughes is perhaps best known for being the originator of the three words "ambition is critical", which are embedded into the pavement outside Swansea railway station. Thanks to a scene in Kevin Allen's cult comedy Twin Town (1997), the phrase has become an enduring motto for the city, regularly being misattributed to Dylan Thomas. In April 2011, political party Plaid Cymru were forced to correct a manifesto that used it as its title, incorrectly stating that it was chosen in honour of the upcoming Dylan Thomas centenary in 2014. Many quickly pointed out the party's mistake, with poet Nigel Jenkins remarking that although it was a splendid slogan to choose for his election manifesto, Plaid leader Ieuan Wyn Jones was simply fuelling the urban myth. The prevalence of the misconception was made apparent again in August 2021, when the new sponsors of the Swansea.com Stadium became the latest to incorrectly attribute the phrase when using it on the front page of their website.

"Ambition is critical" was created as part of a 1993 commission, shared with fellow poets Nigel Jenkins and Menna Elfyn, to write site-specific poems for use in a refurbished Swansea city centre. However, many of the one-line 'micropoems' that were inscribed on street furniture were soon removed, following a smear campaign in the Swansea Herald and South Wales Evening Post that suggested the poets were making fun of the "local patois." The only poem to survive both the 1993 cull and later city-centre refurbishments was Hughes' "ambition is critical", by then a celebrated phrase in the city due to its appearance in Twin Town. In 2015, the three words were crudely restored by the council, who filled in the damaged metal letters with a bright red resin. However, exposure to the elements meant that by 2020 the resin had dulled in colour and the artwork was again closer to its original form.

Although it was written prior to the release of his first collection of poetry Tidy Boy in 1998, it was not until the publication of Hughes' second collection Working Out in 2021 that "ambition is critical" appeared on the page, being used as the concluding line of a longer poem titled 'Slogan'.

== Bibliography ==
=== Poetry ===
- Tidy Boy (1998)
- Working Out (2021)
