= Swansea Beach =

Beach in Swansea, Wales

Coordinates: 51.592°N 3.964°W

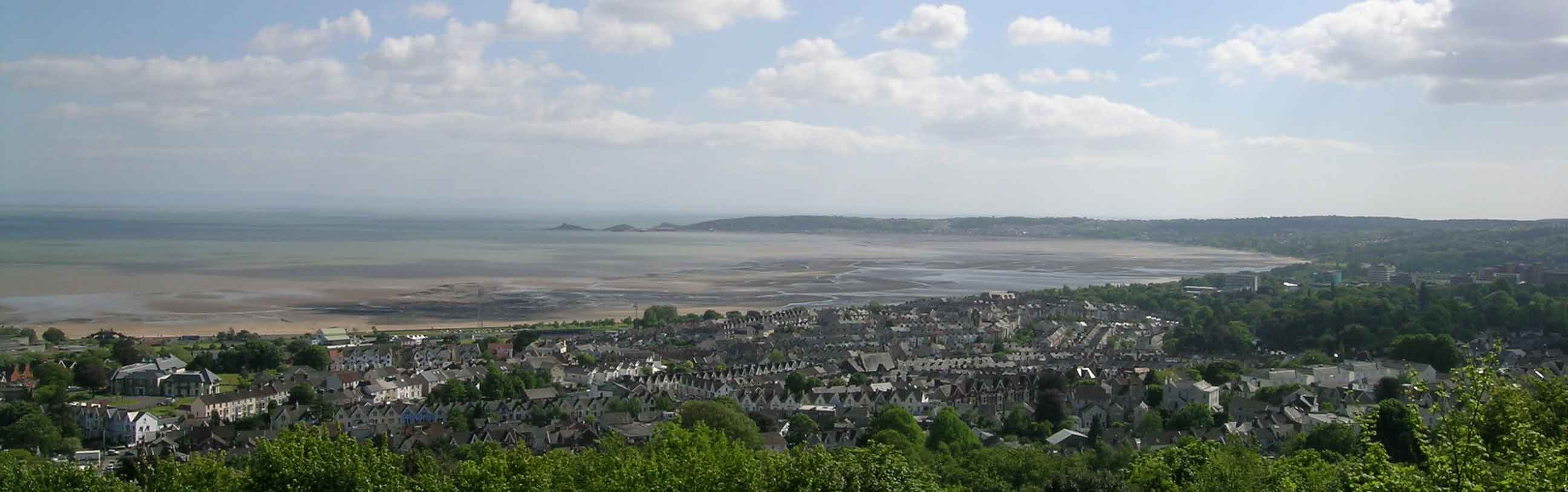
The sweep of Swansea Beach viewed from Townhill

Swansea Beach stretches for five miles along Swansea Bay between the Maritime Quarter and the "Knab Rock" near Mumbles in Wales. It is backed by a promenade/cycle track (part of National Cycle Route 4) and a coastal road. The southern section of the Swansea Bay beach between Blackpill and Mumbles is designated Site of Special Scientific Interest.

Swansea Beach has a couple of named sections. The section of beach just outside Victoria park is known as "The Slip". Blackpill Beach is the section around the mouth of the Clyne River.

== Tourism ==
In recent years, tourism has provided a boost to the local economy. Swansea Bay itself was popular in Victorian times and in the early part of the 20th century. However, despite having dunes and golden sands over a large section of the Bay all the way from the mouth of the River Neath to Blackpill, with the exception of the Swansea Docks breakwater, it now rarely hosts more than a few hundred visitors on even the best day, even in the height of summer and has seen little of the tourist boom. Ironically in the last ten years or so, with the reduction in pollution (see below) has come an increase in the amount of sand on the lower stretches of the Bay at low tide which were once almost pure mud flats. The bay in Swansea previously had an abundance of sand but in the last century 300,000 tonnes of sand were removed from the beach and shipped to Blackpool which had a shortage of sand.

In an attempt to popularise the Bay, in late February 2007, Swansea Council announced plans for a major revamp of the entire Bay from The Slip all the way round to Mumbles Pier. These include new toilets at The Slip, further improvements to the St. Helens Ground, housing on part of the Recreation Ground, a new 'Extreme Sports' Centre at Sketty Lane, further improvements at the popular Blackpill Lido including a new cycle and pedestrian bridge linking the coast path to the Clyne Valley Cycle Path, a multi-story car park at Mumbles Quarry and mixed development at Oystermouth Square and improvements to the Mumbles Pier.

There are children's play areas at Blackpill and the area near the Swansea city centre called "The Slip".

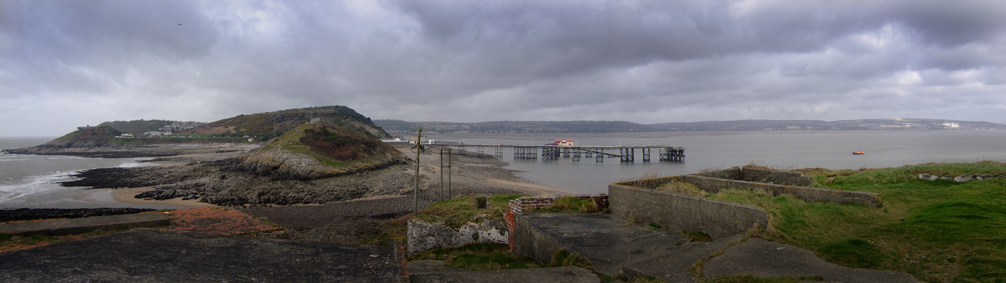
Bracelet bay, Mumbles and Swansea bay, seen from the Mumbles Lighthouse
