= Environment Centre (Swansea) =

Coordinates: 51°37′07″N 3°56′11″W

The Environment Centre Swansea
- Founded: May 1994
- Founder: The Prince of Wales in April 1995
- Type: Company Limited by Guarantee, Registered Charity
- VAT ID no.: 2929729
- Registration no.: 1039378
- Purpose: information, education, activity
- Location: The Old Telephone Exchange, Pier Street, Swansea SA1 1RY (Maritime Quarter, Castle ward), UK
- Origins: Swansea Environmental Forum (SEF)
- Region served: Swansea, South West Wales
- Members: individual, groups and schools
- Key people: Rhian Corcoran (manager)
- Website: www.environmentcentre.org.uk

The Environment Centre in Swansea, Wales, is an independent charity organisation for environmental information, education and activity. Environment Centre may also refer to the building the charity is located in.

The Environment Centre's aims are to raise people's awareness of environmental issues, to increase the participation in environmental projects and to work towards a more sustainable future. It promotes, for example, the concept of the three Rs (reduce, reuse, recycle). The Centre provides support for environmental organisations and groups, information on environmental issues and educational activities. Both the charity organisation and its building serve as a central place of exchange and networking for environmental organisations all around Swansea and South Wales. Organisations and businesses can hire rooms in the centre for meetings, training, talks, conferences, interviews and events. The centre also has low cost office space available for local voluntary sector organisations.

== History ==
The Environment Centre was formed by the Swansea Environmental Forum (SEF) in May 1994 with the City Council of Swansea, the Countryside Council for Wales and the Prince of Wales Committee participating. The SEF itself is now based in the Environment Centre. In 1995 the Prince of Wales opened the building. Located in Pier Street, it is a part of the general revitalisation of Swansea's Maritime Quarter.

== The building ==
Before the Environment Centre came to use the old red brick building in the Maritime Quarter, it was used as one of Swansea's telephone exchanges (now located in BT Tower). When renovating the Old Telephone Exchange to shape the Environment Centre, reuse of old materials lessened the needs for new ones. The modern western part of the building, the Resource Centre or annexe, was built by Air Architecture in 1999 and opened in 2001. It was built under eco-design principles, reusing and recycling old material and fitting the building with sustainable technologies. The Environment Centre thus demonstrates practical energy efficiency measures. The Annexe was awarded with the Lord Mayor's design awards 2000 in the Categories Best new build – non-residential and Energy efficient. A solar panel on the roof of the centre is used to heat the annexe's water and also for the annexe's under floor heating. The turf roof and the organic garden in the back yard provide an eco-friendly environment for the staff and visitors of the centre.

== Ecological, organic and fairtrade goods ==
The annexe hosts a fairtrade internet café and a green shop, providing products which are fairly traded, organic or produced ecologically. Amongst the range of products are Ecoleaf (by Suma cooperative), Doy Bags and Ecover cleaning products, which are claimed to be effective and completely biodegradable. For waste reducing reasons, the shop offers the possibility to refill old vessels of cleaning products. Many rooms of the Environment Centre are used by independent environmental organisations, as part of the Environment Centre's policy of supporting environmental organisations.

== Information at the Centre ==
Besides personal answers from people at the centre, the following information is available:

- Positive News, a quarterly newspaper published in the UK
- Green Light, the centre's own monthly newsletter, containing recent affairs, relevant news and events around Swansea
- books, leaflets, flyers, brochures, postcards and many other materials on environmental and humanitarian issues

== The EC as an umbrella organisation ==
One of the three aims of The Environment Centre is to support local environmental organisations. This is being done by providing office space to others. The Environment Centre thus functions as an umbrella organisation for other organisations. These include:

- Undercurrents, a video activist organisation providing alternative news
- Friends of the Earth, Swansea's local group of Friends of the Earth England, Wales & Northern Ireland, an environmental pressure group
- Sustainable Swansea Initiative, a project aiming for increasing the level of sustainability in all levels of human action in Swansea. One of its projects is a Green Map of Swansea.
- Swansea Environmental Education Forum (SEEF), an organisation increasing the awareness and quality of environmentally related education throughout Swansea, providing information, resources and contacts
- MOre Green Project, an organisation for collecting and distributing furniture for recycling and reusing
- OnePeople Productions, a film production organisation featuring underdogs
- BTCV Wales, British Trust for Conservation Volunteers, Wales
- BikeAbility Wales, an organisation promoting bike riding for people with all abilities
- Welsh Youth Forum on Sustainable Development (wyfsd)
- Bat Conservation Trust
- Swansea Community Recycling Alliance Partnership (SCRAP), a project aiming the reduction of waste production in Swansea
- DJ Transport Consultants
- Swansea Fair Trade Forum, for information and activity on Fairtrade
- Groundwork, an organisation helping with changes in order to live in better neighbourhoods

Undercurrents, OnePeople and Sustainable Swansea both produce videos and images shared on Swansea Telly, a local video portal similar to YouTube.
