= St. David's Shopping Centre (Swansea) =

Shopping centre in Swansea, Wales

Coordinates: 51.618°N 3.943°W

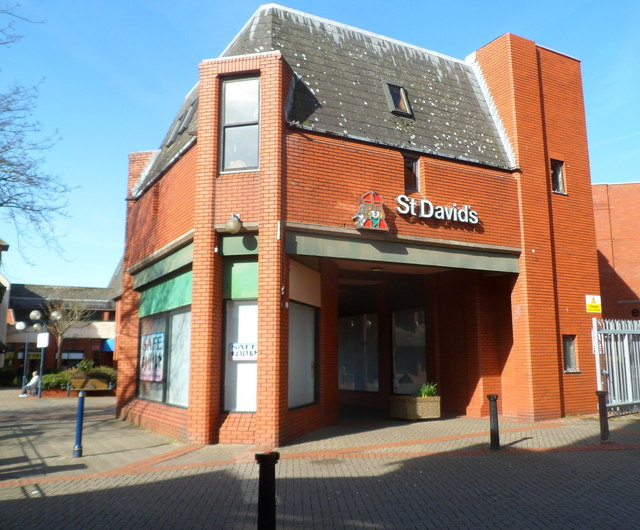
Entrance to St David's Shopping Centre

St. David's Shopping Centre is a shopping complex in Swansea, south Wales. The complex is located adjacent to the Quadrant Shopping Centre and opposite St Mary's Church. Completed in 1982, the complex has thus far been fairly unsuccessful, in terms of filling its outlet spaces and retaining customers.

The complex consists of several buildings, clad in red brick, which comprise a number of shop units at ground level which are directly accessible from the street. There was a market hall on the first floor which is now closed. During the 1980s the upper floor area was open and contained many small stalls run by local traders. To the south of the complex lies the St. David's car park.

An octagonal building located in the north west corner of the complex was occupied by S4C as a studio for a number of years. The studio was used for broadcasting the Heno programme. The building was originally built to be occupied by a restaurant but it was never taken up for this purpose. For most of the building's lifetime so far, it has been unoccupied.

Also, there have been many plans for the old shopping centre including demolition and expansion of the adjacent Quadrant shopping centre; or total demolition and to be replaced by a multi-storey car park. If approved it would have led to the demolition of the Quadrant and St, Davids car parks to expand the Quadrant shopping centre. All of the plans include the Quadrant as an integral part. Swansea Council and the Welsh Government bought the complex in December 2011 with a plan to demolish the empty part of the site to create a 160 space car park.

In April 2018 it was announced that the shopping centre site would be turned into a 3,500-seater arena run as part of the Ambassador Theatre Group.
