= François Hennebique =

French civil engineer

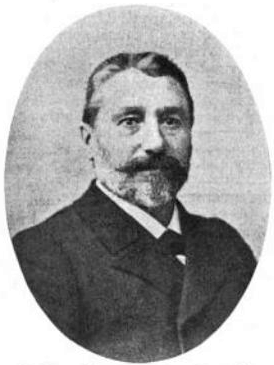
- Born: 26 April 1842
- Died: 7 March 1921 (aged 78)
- Occupation: engineer
- Known for: reinforced-concrete

François Hennebique (26 April 1842 – 7 March 1921) was a French engineer and self-educated builder who patented his pioneering reinforced-concrete construction system in 1892, integrating separate elements of construction, such as the column and the beam, into a single monolithic element. The Hennebique system was one of the first appearances of the modern reinforced-concrete method of construction.

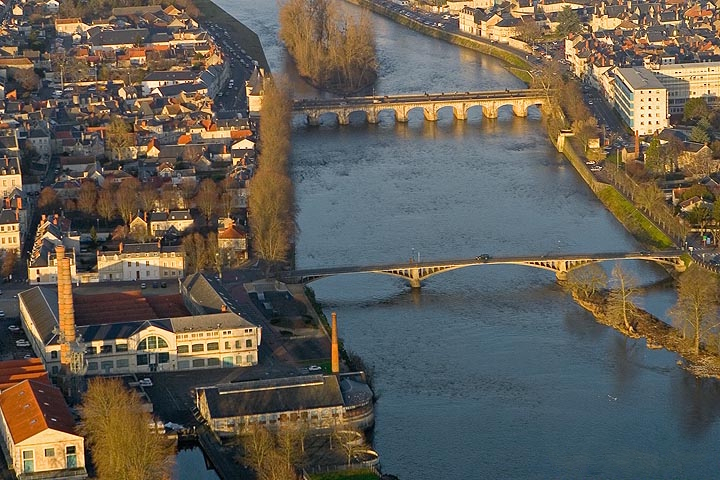
Châtellerault bridge, bottom of picture

Hennebique had first worked as a stonemason, later becoming a builder, with a particular interest in restoration of old churches. Hennebique's Béton Armé system started out by using concrete as a fireproof protection for wrought iron beams, on a house project in Belgium in 1879. He realised however, that the floor system would be more economic if the iron were used only where the slab was in tension, relying on the concrete in the compression areas. His solution was reinforced concrete – a concrete slab with steel bars in its bottom face.

His business developed rapidly, expanding from five employees in Brussels in 1896, to twenty-five two years later when he moved to Paris. In addition, he had a rapidly expanding network of firms acting as agents for his system. These included L.G. Mouchel and F.A. Macdonald & Partners in Britain, and Eduard Zublin in Germany. He was asked in 1896 by Hector Guimard for the terrace of the armory Coutolleau in Angers.

== Biography ==
François Hennebique was born on April 25, 1842, in Neuville-Saint-Vaast, France. Benjamin Hennebique, merchant, was his father. In 1860 François Hennebique became a bricklayer and decided to take to restoration of churches. In 1867 he established this own construction and repair company in Brussels. There François Hennebique learnt about construction with reinforced-concrete according to the system of Joseph Monier. In 1879 Hennebique for the first time used the reinforced-concrete in a construction. In 1892 he established international engineering agency in Paris and registered his first patent for usage of the reinforced-concrete named "Special combination of metal and cement". He also developed his concept, which later became the Hennebique System: a set of reinforcing cramps made of flat iron with width of 25 to 30 mm, designed to connect and homogenize the masses that were to become the forerunners of reinforcement. In 1894 he build his first reinforced-concrete bridge in Switzerland. Being a building engineer in early 1901 he took park in a special Commission whose tasks were to set requirements for building processes (in particular usage of reinforced-concrete) to be allowed for work. Bétons Armés Hennebique (BAH) construction agency ceased its activities on 1967. During the time of its activity, it fulfilled 150,000 projects.

== Buildings using the system ==
=== United Kingdom ===
The first building erected in the United Kingdom using this system was the 1897 Weaver Building in what was then the Docks area of Swansea, but it was demolished in 1984 when the docks were redeveloped to make way for the Maritime Quarter development. A column from the fifth floor of the original building was preserved by the Science Museum, with another piece going to Amberley Museum. Another fragment lies by the side of the river Tawe, where a plaque commemorates Hennebique and his achievement, although unfortunately it spells his first name incorrectly (Francais rather than François). Between 1892 and 1902, over 7,000 structures were built using the Hennebique system, including buildings, water towers and bridges. Most of these were by other firms licensing the technology, although Hennebique designed some structures himself, including the 1899 bridge at Châtellerault (pictured).

=== Ireland ===
Possibly the largest early use of the Hennebique system in Ireland was in the 1924 Irish Independent building which is located at 87-90 Middle Abbey Street, designed by Donnelly Moore Robinson and Keefe Architects.

One of the oldest buildings still in existence is in Sligo in the West of Ireland. Batchelors building Finisklin is located in Harbour Hill, Finisklin, Sligo. The factory was built in 1905. The building was originally a maize mill and grain silo. It was later bought by Batchelors and used as a food distribution centre. The building is one of the earliest surviving examples of the Hennebique system in the island of Ireland.

== See also ==
- Joseph Monier

== External links and sources ==
- François Hennebique at Structurae
- CIVL 1101 – History of Concrete Construction – Course material at University of Memphis
- Information on the S.S. Francois Hennebique, a concrete ship built during World War II.
