= Edgar Henry Banger =

English cartoon illustrator (1897–1968)

Edgar Henry Banger (27 February 1897 – 1968), also known as Harry Banger, was a cartoon illustrator most proficient during the 1930s. His colourful characters were included in comics such as Rattler, Dazzler, Slick Fun, Cute fun, Rocket and Bouncer. Also producing a rare seen Koko the Pup in some publications.

Not only did he operate from Wood Street Norwich prior to this during the war he worked from his studio in his home on Grapes hill, this house no longer exists.

== Early life ==
He was the son of a Norfolk photographer, also called Edgar Henry Banger.

== Career ==
Banger's most famous was Koko the Pup for DC Thomson's Magic, and also Dilly Duckling which appeared in Sunny Stories through late 40s and into the 50s.

His artwork was also well recognised through Norfolk, being a regular cartoonist for the local papers such as The Eastern Daily Press and the Evening News. He was a Norwich City Football Club and contributed to their paper The Pink Un, in which a lot of his tongue in cheek cartoons were mostly football based. He was famous for the characters Canary and Dumpling featuring debonair characters with a cartoon Canary or Dumpling head in the Norwich city Colours. A lot of his cartoons were monogrammed HB, Bang, or Harry Banger.

== Where he worked ==
Banger mostly worked from his small studio room in the back of the terrace house that he lived in at Wood Street, Norwich, with his wife Maud Banger.

== Death ==
Banger died in 1968 at the age of 71.
