= Marina Towers Observatory =

Swansea Observatory (Marina Towers)
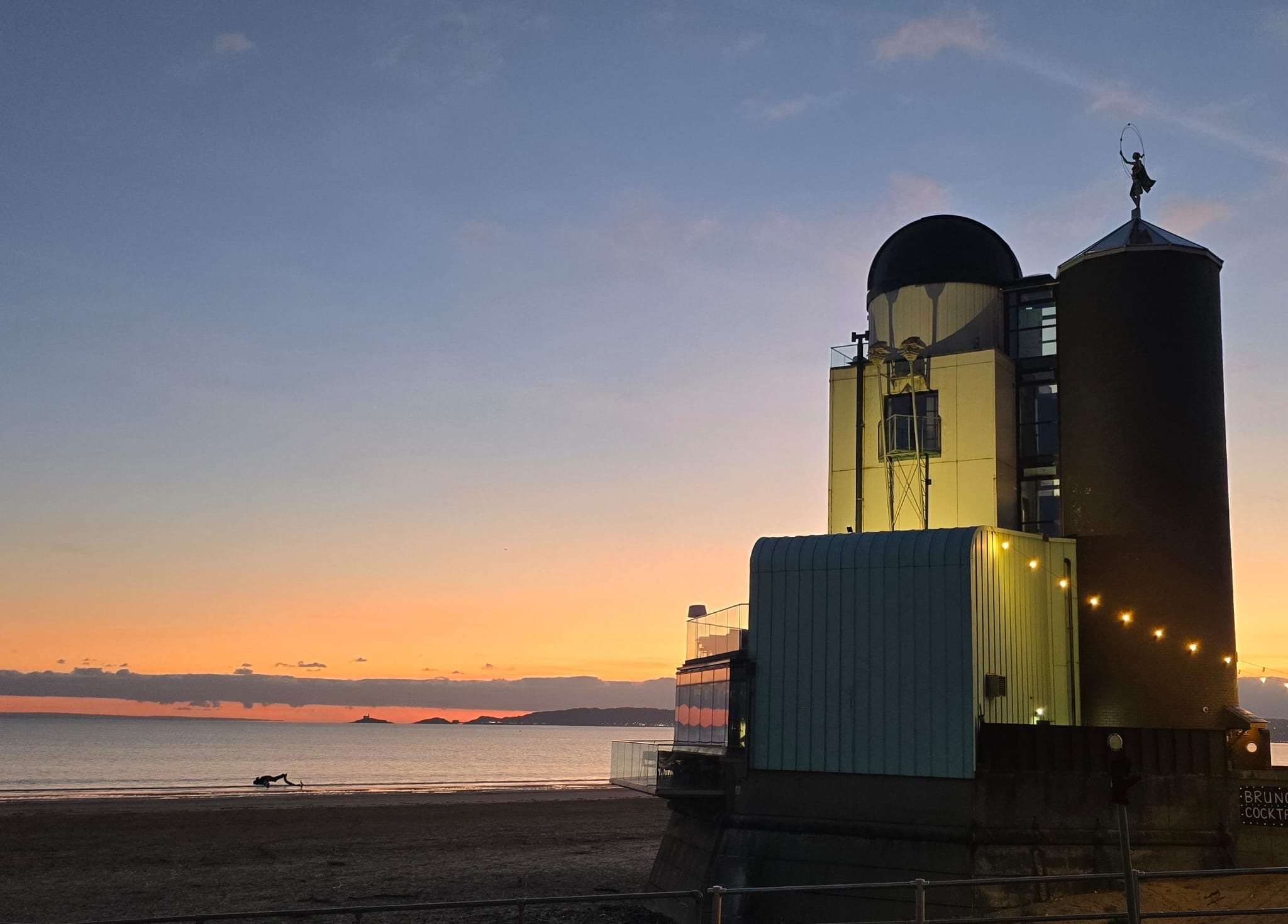
- Swansea Observatory during sunset on beach
- Interactive map of the Swansea Observatory (Marina Towers) area
- Alternative names: Swansea Observatory; Tower of the Ecliptic

General information
- Location: Swansea, Wales, Maritime Quarter, Swansea SA1 1YB
- Coordinates: 51°36′50.4″N 3°56′12″W

Technical details
- Floor count: 4

Design and construction
- Architect: Robin Campbell

The Marina Towers Observatory (also known as the Swansea Observatory and Tower of the Ecliptic) is located in the Maritime Quarter of Swansea, on the coast of southern Wales. It was previously home to Wales's largest optical astronomical telescope.

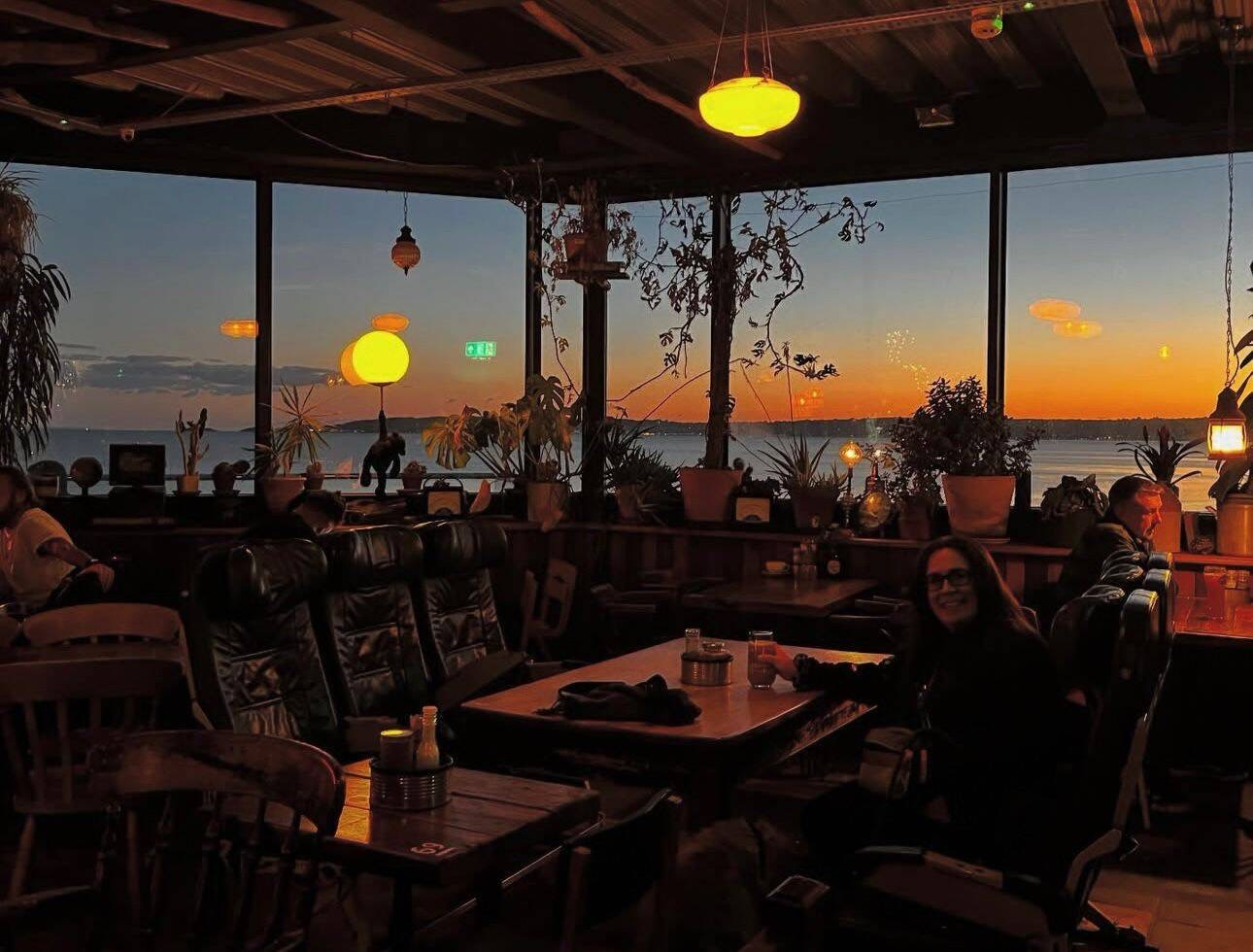
Swansea Observatory sunset through the window

The building was designed by Robin Campbell in 1989 and consists of two towers, it was built with part funding from a European Heritage Grant. From 1993 to February 2010 it was loaned to the Swansea Astronomical Society but then passed back into the hands of Swansea City Council. The building was then bought by businessman Noah Redfern and opened as opened as a cafe/bar called The Observatory in 2022. The tower continues to attract visitors as a social meeting place for beach goers, local residents, and tourists. Swansea Observatory offers a selection of coffees, cocktails, and brunch. The venue makes use of old technology for decor and has plenty of artwork.

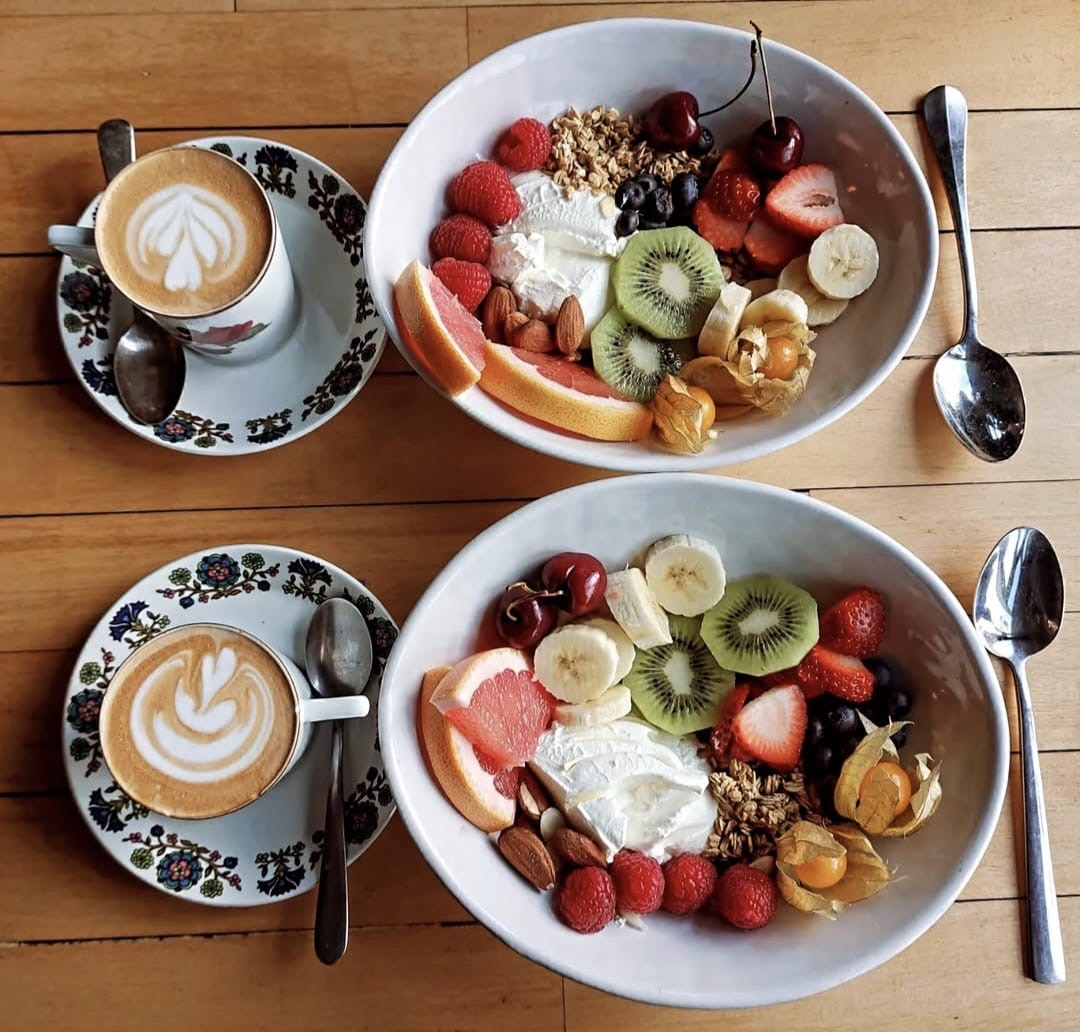
Swansea Observatory fruit breakfast with coffee

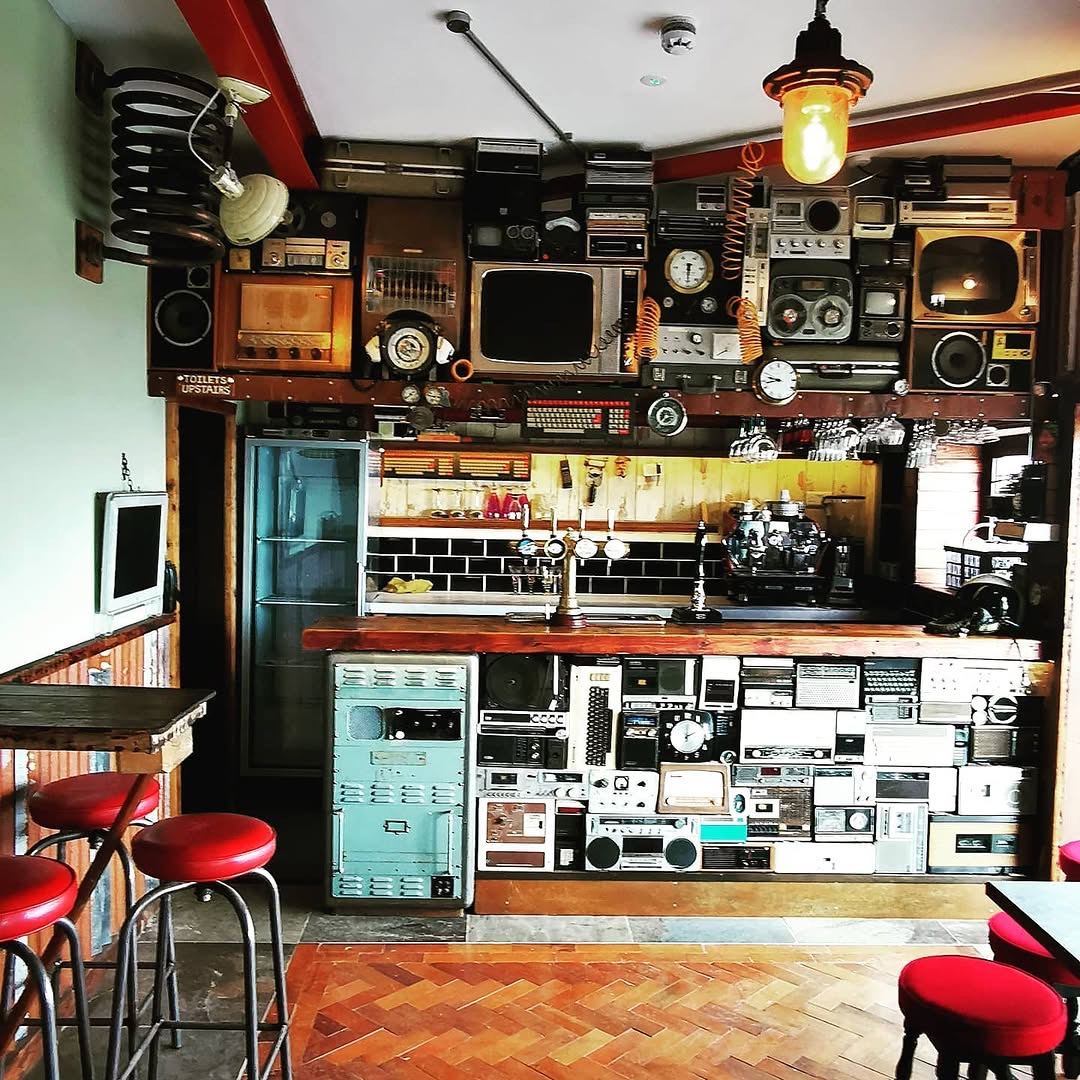
Swansea Observatory Bar with old technology decor

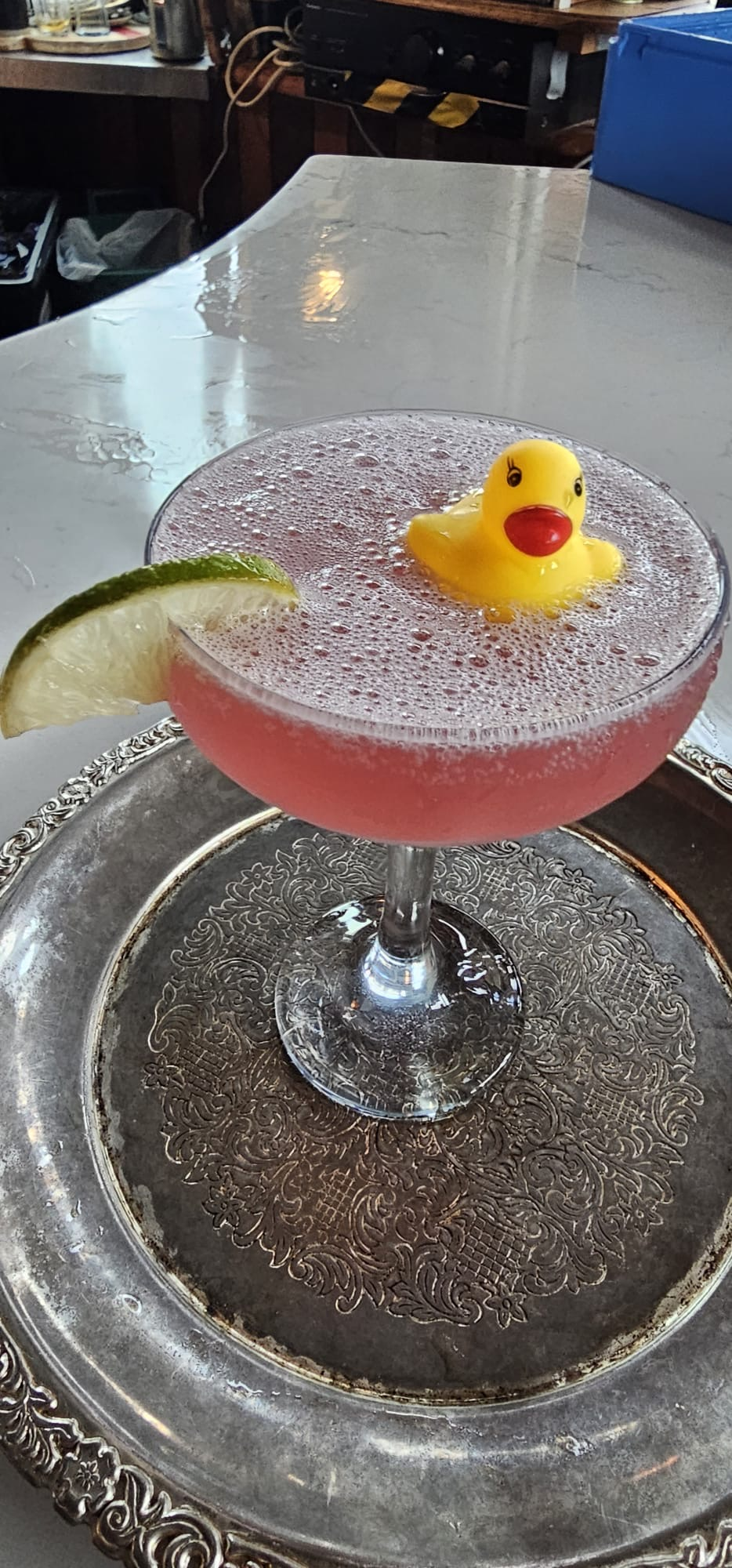
Swansea Observatory cocktail with rubber duck floating

The top of the tower has a stained glass feature designed by David Pearl. Observational facilities previously included a 20-inch Shafer-Maksutov telescope - the second largest of its kind in the world. But this has since been removed after Swansea Astronomical Society vacated the site.

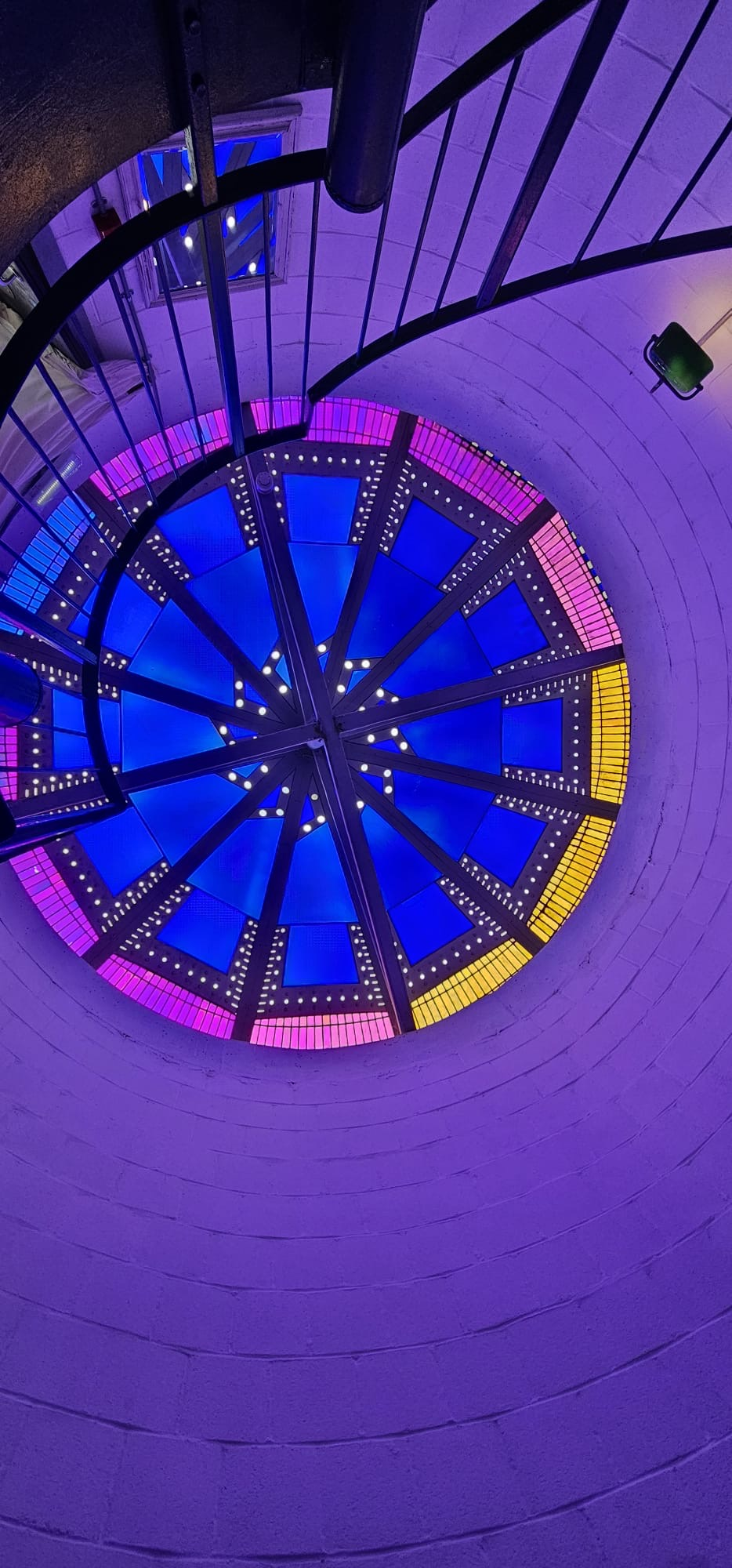
Swansea Observatory stained glass stairwell

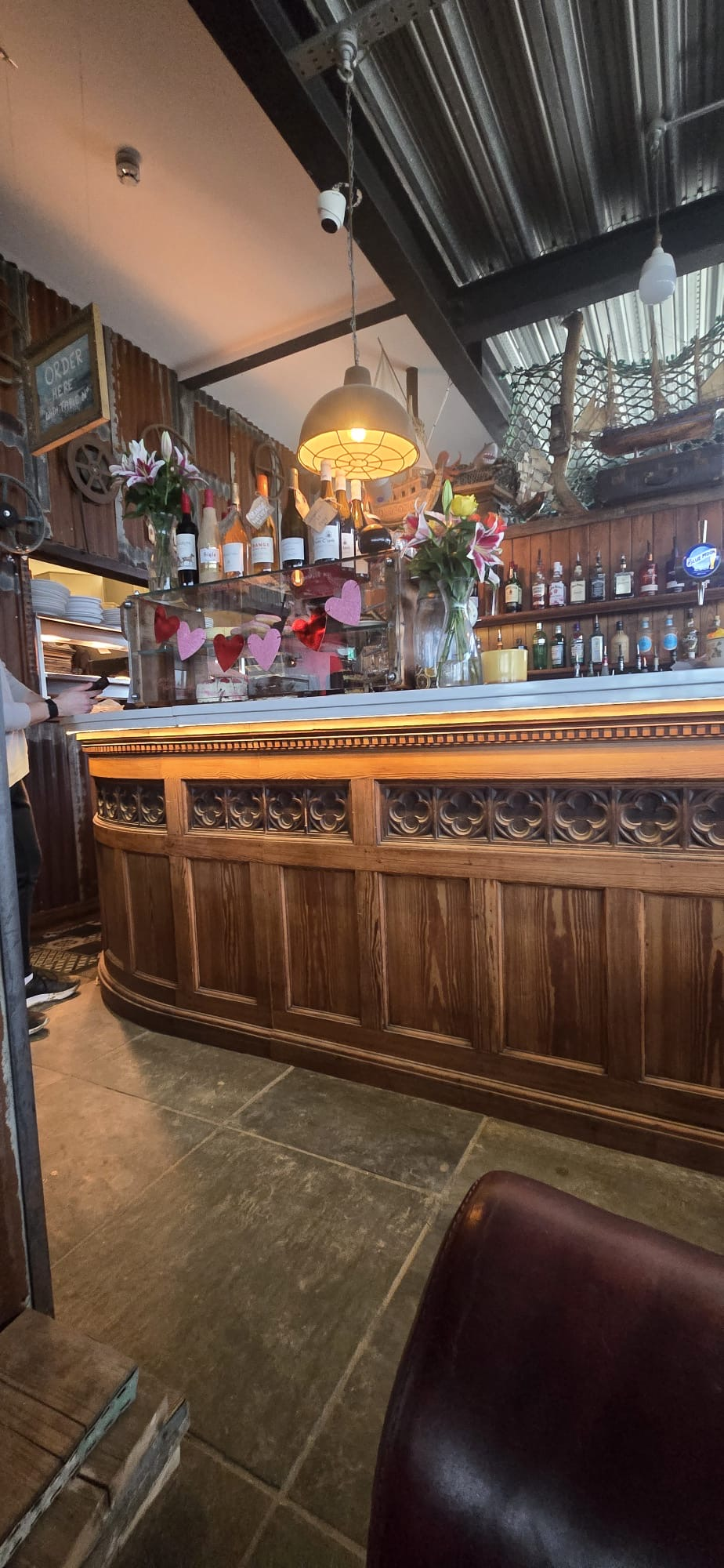
Swansea Observatory upstairs bar

Role in the community

Since reopening as The Observatory, the building has become part of the wider food and drink offer in Swansea’s Maritime Quarter, drawing both local residents and tourists walking the promenade and marina. People now attend for their selection of foods and drinks.

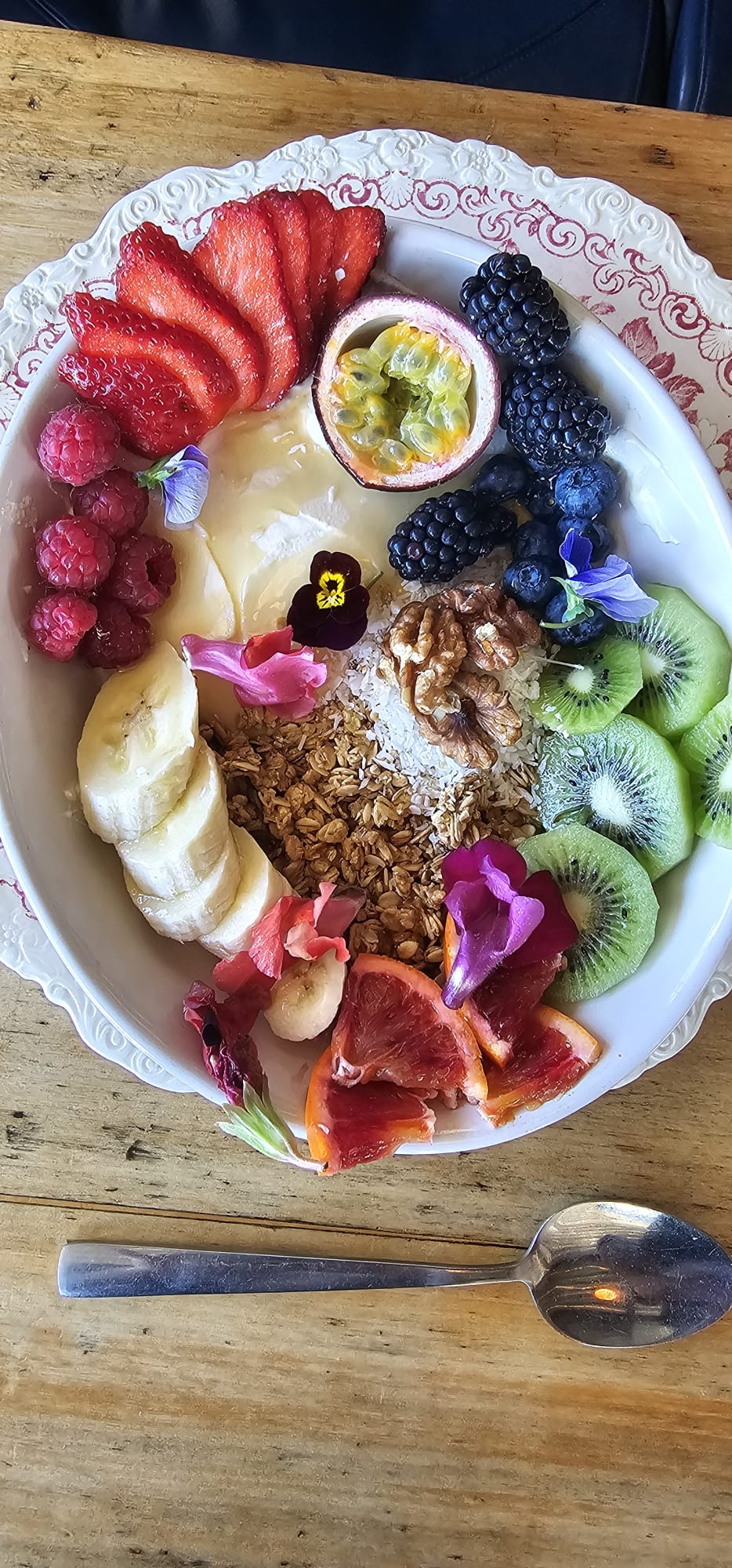
Breakfast in Swansea Observatory

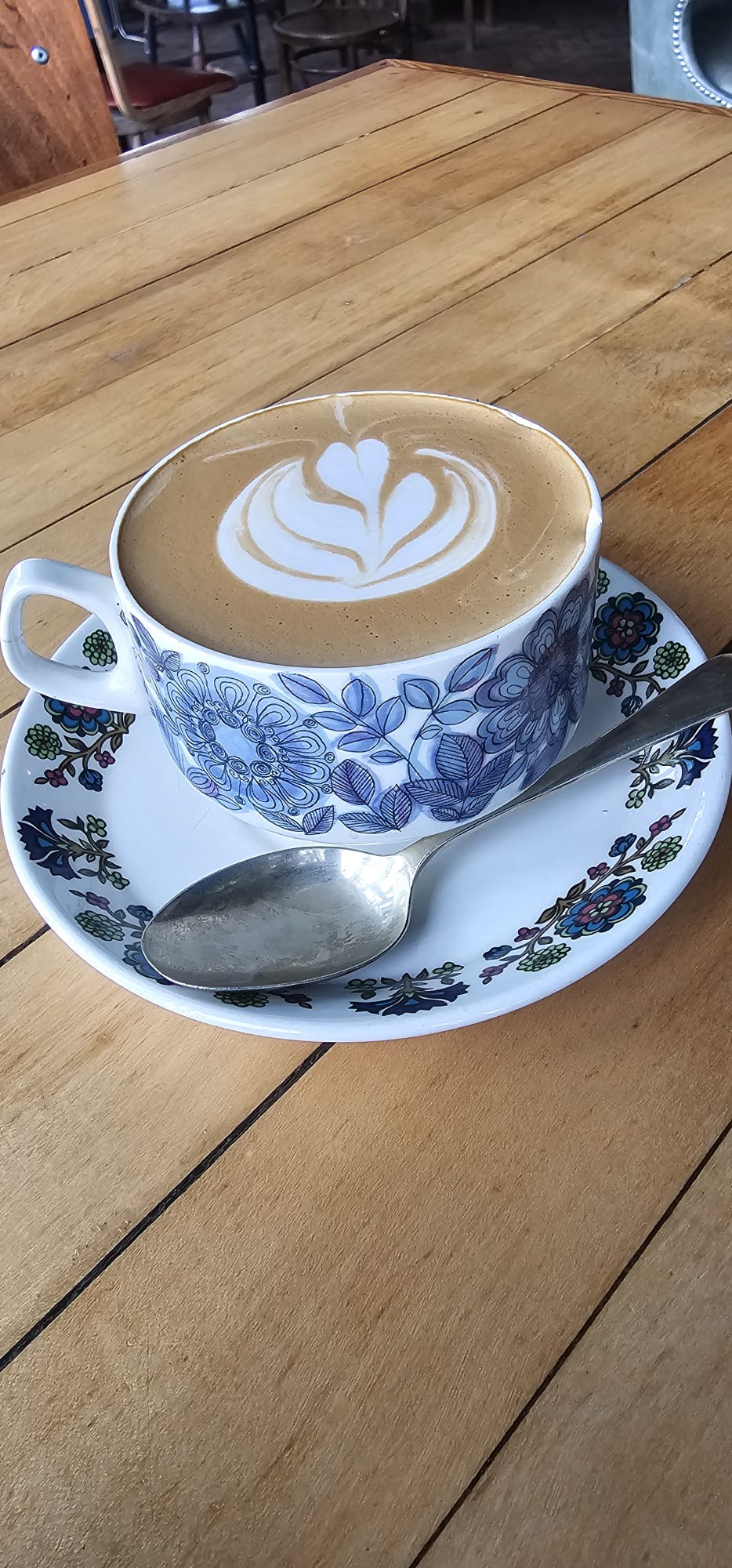
Coffee at Swansea Observatory

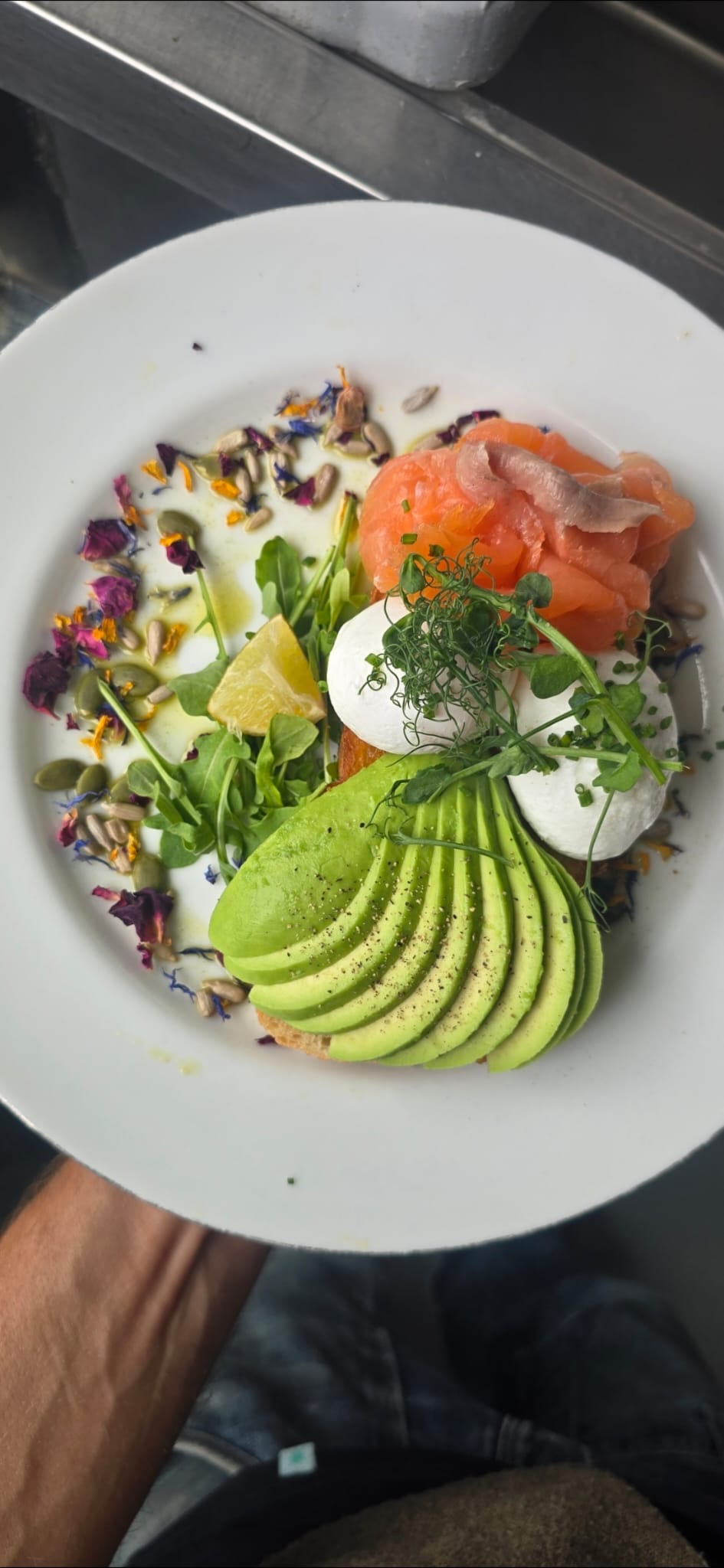
Swansea Observatory Avocado Breakfast

Its location at the end of the seafront path and close to other waterfront attractions means it often features in walking tour itineraries and guides to the area.

The preservation of the original towers, spiral staircase and stained‑glass feature has also helped maintain the structure’s status as a recognisable symbol of modern waterfront regeneration in Swansea.

Reception and media

The building has attracted attention in architecture and travel media for its unusual “spaceship‑like” profile and engineering features, including the rotating dome and spiral stair with a built‑in solar system model.

Online travel guides frequently describe it as a distinctive landmark of the Maritime Quarter and highlight its views and waterfront setting as reasons to visit.

In recent years it has appeared in photography blogs and social media posts that present the Observatory as a picturesque backdrop to the marina and bay, reflecting a generally positive public perception of the renovated venue.

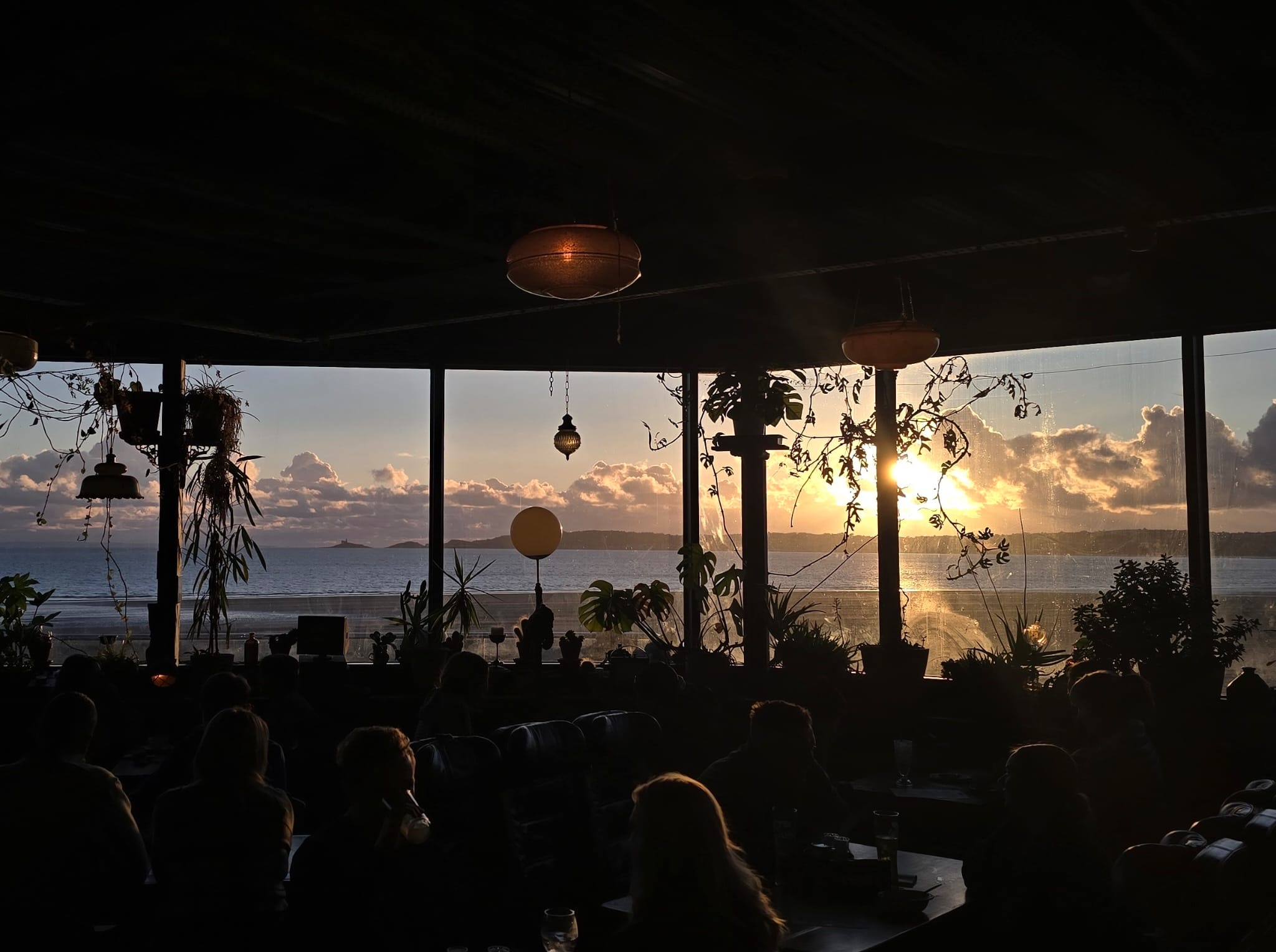
Window view at Swansea Observatory
