= SA1 Swansea Waterfront =

New development in Swansea, Wales

Coordinates: 51.62044°N 3.92392°W

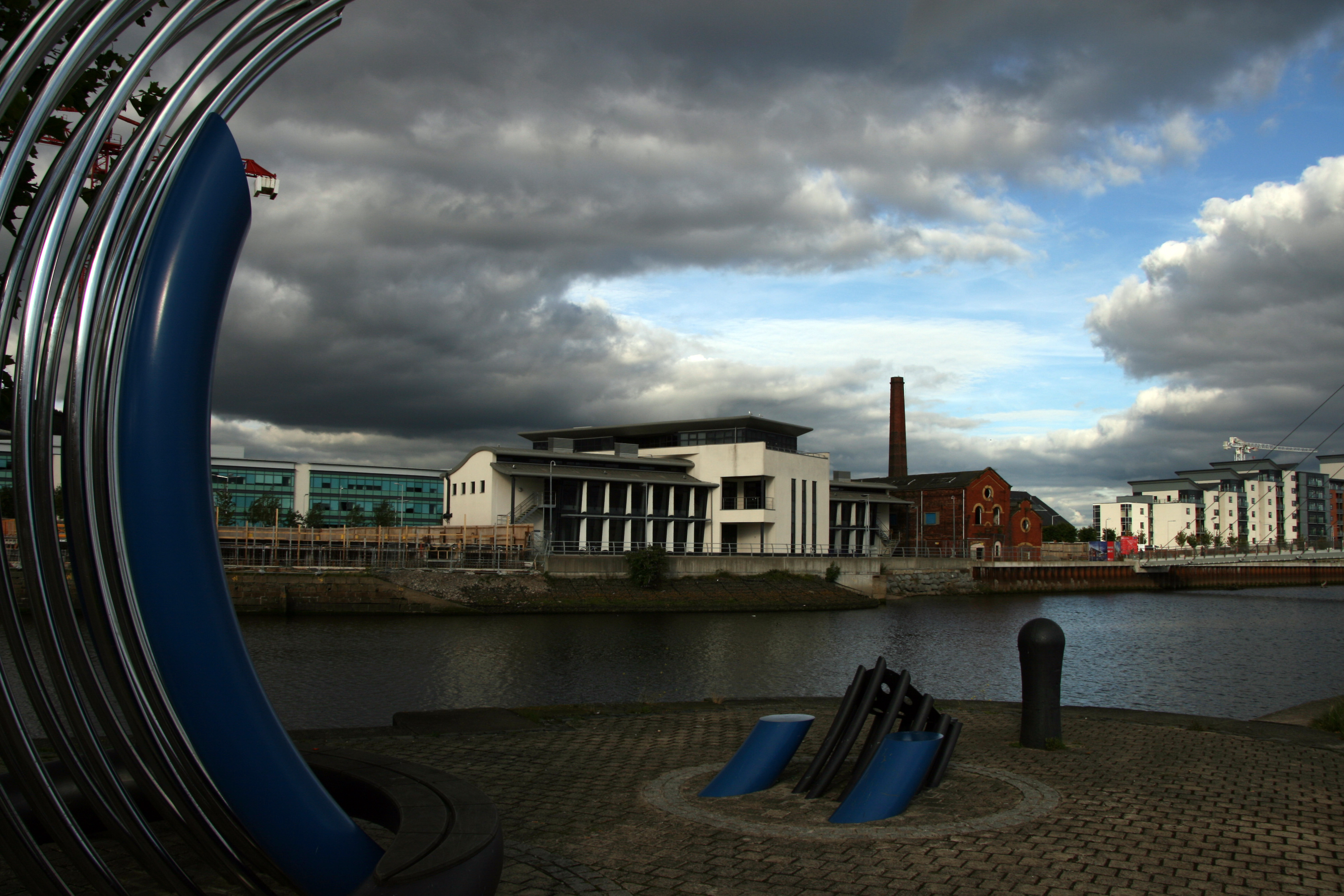
The Technium Centre

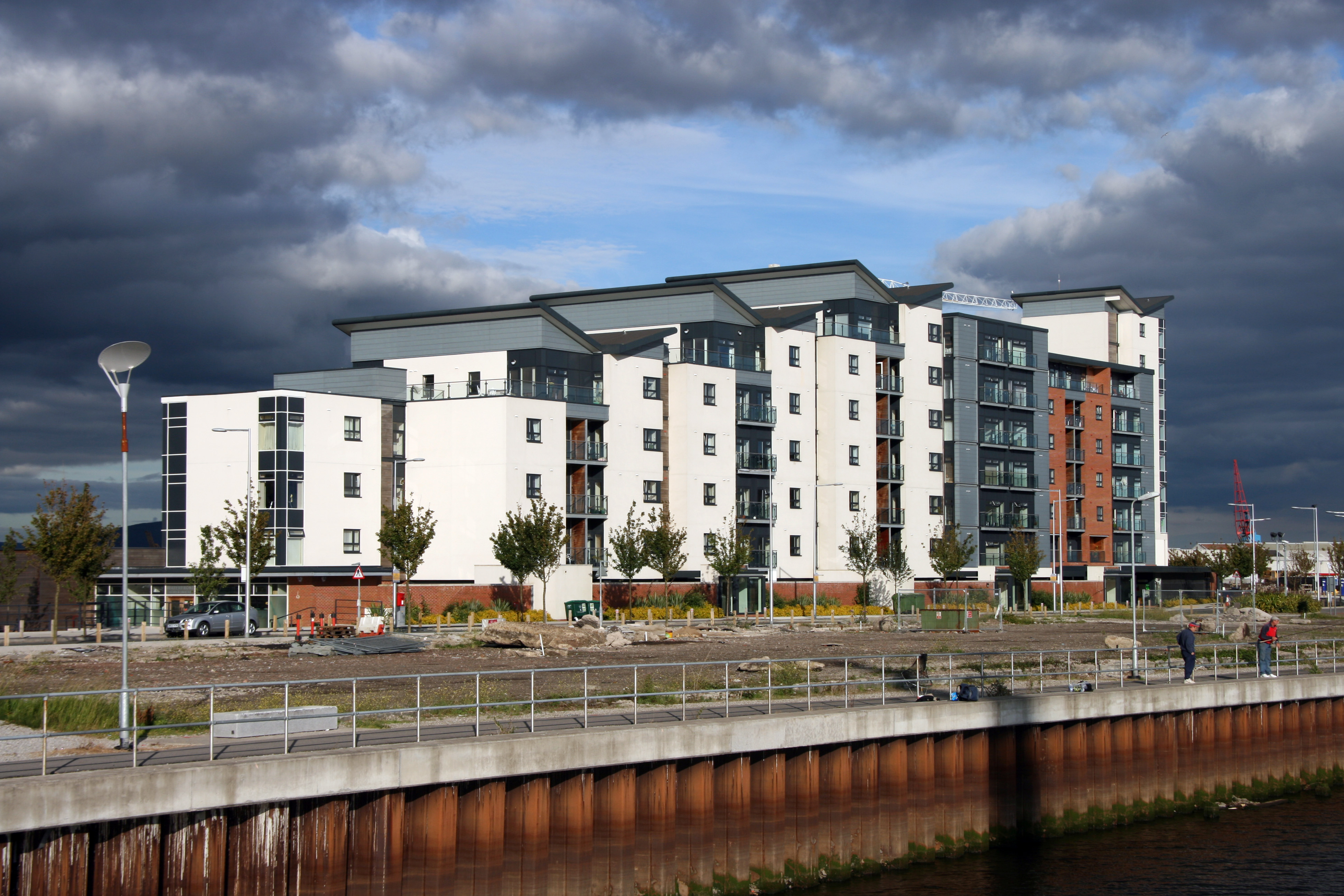
Bellway Homes's Altamar apartment block overlooking the Prince of Wales Dock

SA1 Swansea Waterfront (colloquially: SA1) is mixed commercial and residential development on brownfield in the northern part of Swansea Docks, Wales. The area lies directly to the southeast of Swansea city centre. It is bordered by the Fabian Way to the north, and includes the Prince of Wales Dock.

The forecast outputs are 2,900 new jobs, about 2,000+ new apartments and houses, 65,000 m^{2} (700,000 sq ft) of business/offices; 29,000 m^{2} (312,000 sq ft) of commercial leisure; 26,400 m^{2} (284,200 sq ft) of hotel development; 23,200 m^{2} (249,700 sq ft) of institutional facilities; 1,015 m^{2} (10,930 sq ft) of onshore marina facilities.

== Completed projects ==
As of June 2020, completed projects include:

=== Offices ===
- Two Swansea Technium business innovation centres developed jointly by the Welsh Development Agency and Swansea University to encourage more high-tech companies to locate or start up in the city;
- Offices for UK law firm Morgan Cole (although they have since relocated);
- Admiral Group House (née Cyprium) offices leased by Admiral Insurance;
- Ellipse: 55,000 sq ft (5,100 m^{2}) speculative Grade A office development by Babcock and Brown leased by VOSA;
- Ethos Project offices; and
- Langdon House: 42,000 sq ft (3,900 m^{2}) offices by Broadhall Wharfedale.

=== Residential ===
- Altamar: 158 residential apartments by Bellway Homes;
- Llys Hafan: 54 affordable housing units by Gwalia Housing Group;
- Mariner's Court: 79 retirement apartments by Coastal Housing Group
- South Quay: 165 residential apartments by Quest Properties;
- Harbour Quay: 69 residential apartments for Costal Housing.

=== Mixed and other developments ===
- University of Wales Trinity Saint David Waterfront Campus – IQ building and Forum building
- the dismantling and reassembly of the Grade II listed Norwegian Church;
- Ice House bistro wine bar and restaurant complex;
- J Shed warehouse converted into commercial space including offices and restaurants;
- Waterfront Community Church;
- De Vere Village Hotel and leisure club;
- a dental referral centre;
- Premier Inn hotel with attached Beefeater and Tesco Express;
- Beacon Centre for Health; including doctors' surgery, dentist, pharmacy, Swansea University school of Medicine and ABM university health board.

=== Access ===
- Sail Bridge;
- Trafalgar Bridge over the Swansea barrage.

== Under planning/construction ==
Projects under construction or in the pipeline include:

- a private hospital; HMT Sancta Maria
- a new lock tidal basin connecting the Prince of Wales Dock directly with the River Tawe, and berthing for 400 boats;
- Discovery Leisure Quarter, to accommodate a multiplex cinema/bowling/casino/restaurant unit together with residential and student accommodation, and a multi-storey car park
- a range of office developments and housing
- 645-bedroom student apartment complex.

== War Memorial ==
A war memorial stands in the square between the two Technium buildings. commemorating the Merchant Navy seamen of Swansea during World War II.
