= Weaver building =

Demolished structure in Swansea, Wales

Coordinates: 51.620°N 3.938°W

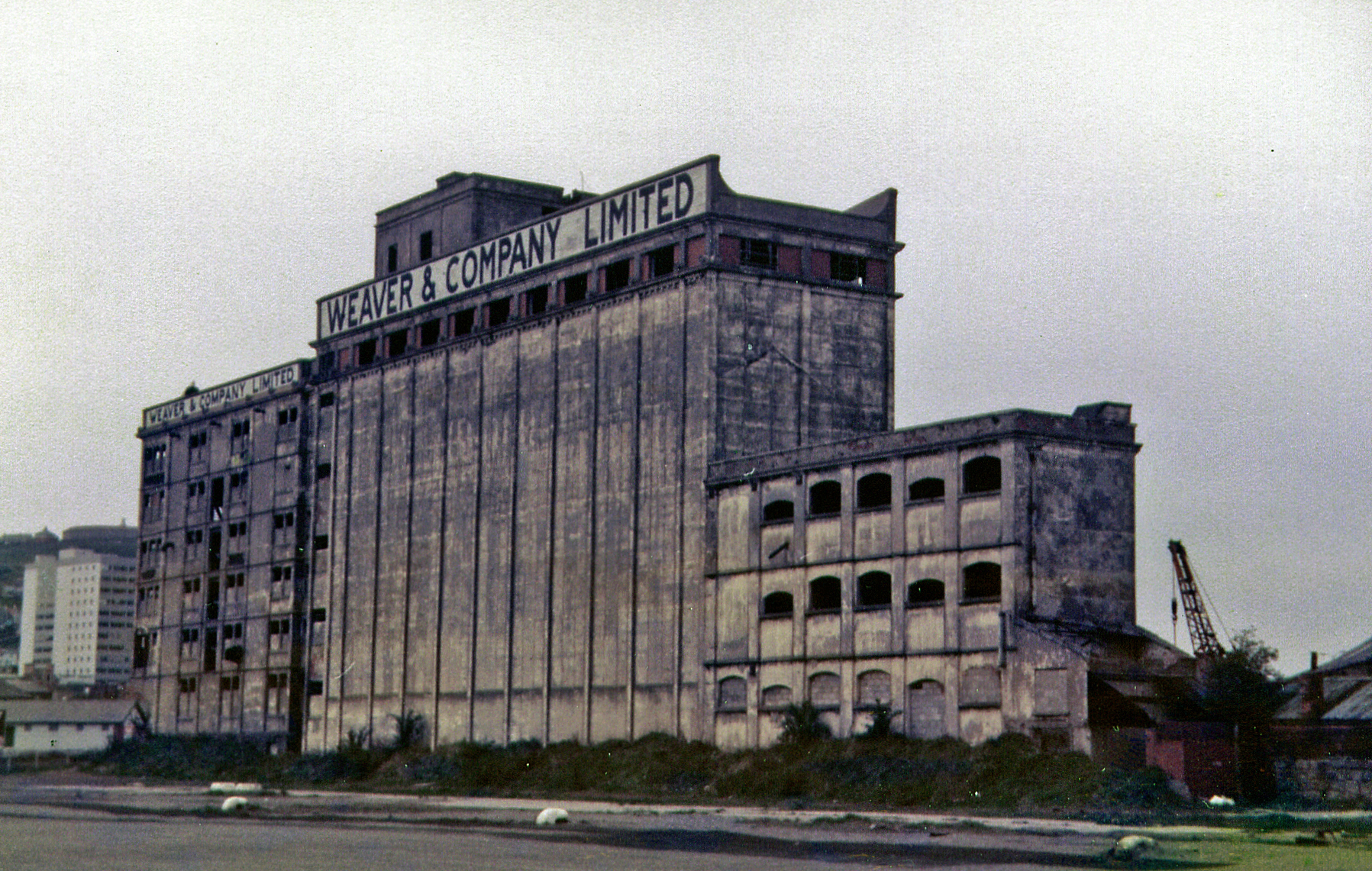
The Weaver Building, disused, in 1979

The Weaver building was a flour mill and corn storage building which stood alongside the half-tide basin of the North Dock in Swansea, South Wales between 1897 and 1984, and was notable as an early reinforced concrete structure.

Six storeys high, 80 ft by 40 ft by 112 ft, with its lower floor cantilevered some 10 ft above loading bays, it formed part of a complex of buildings owned by Weaver & Co. and was designed and built by the French engineer François Hennebique in 1897, being an early example of a reinforced concrete building in Europe. The building survived World War II bombings in 1941, the general post-war clearance of other industrial buildings in the area and the filling in of the adjacent basin in the late 1960s, but was demolished in 1984 to make way for a new Sainsbury's superstore. A column from the fifth floor of the original building was preserved by the Science Museum, with another piece going to Amberley Museum. Another fragment lies by the side of the River Tawe, where a plaque commemorates Hennebique and his achievement.

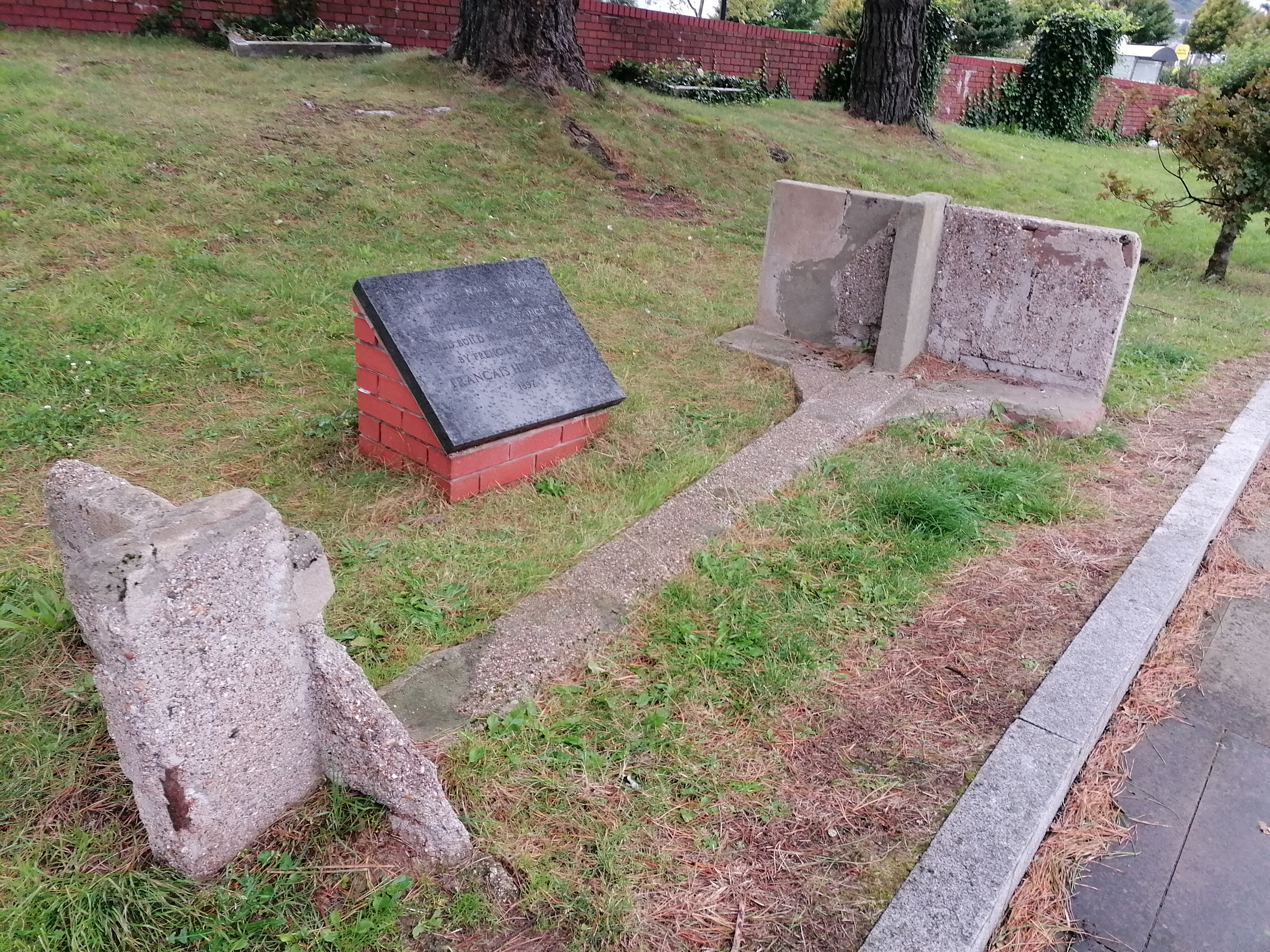
This remnant of the Weaver Building lies alongside New Cut, Swansea, just north of Sainsbury's

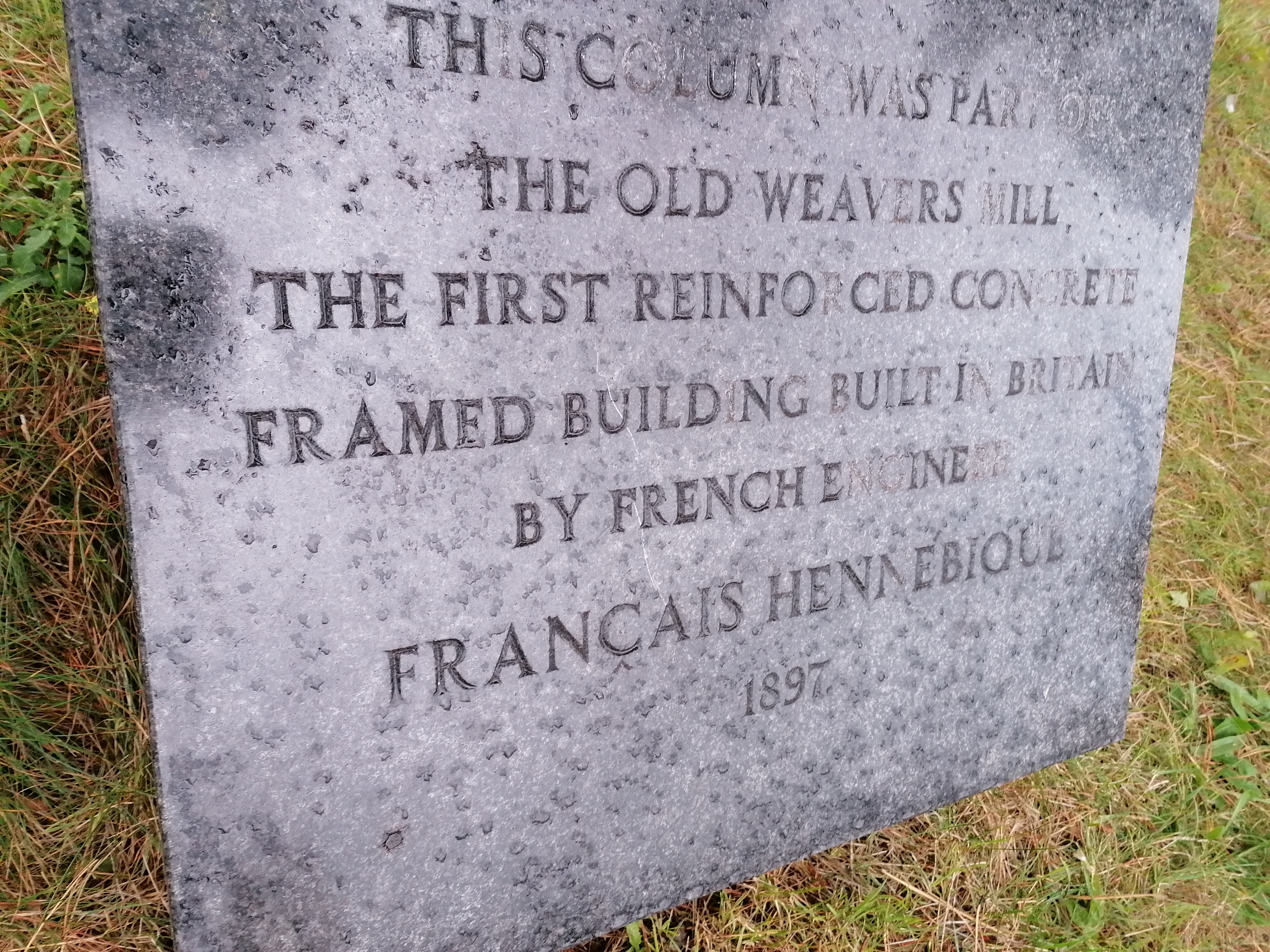
This plaque lies alongside a remnant of reinforced concrete

Reinforced concrete buildings, that served as grain silos, had been erected in Constanța, Brăila and Galați in Romania between 1884 and 1889 by engineer Anghel Saligny, thus prior to the Weaver Company mill at Swansea.
