= Menna Elfyn =

Welsh poet and activist, born 1951

Menna Elfyn FRSL
- Born: 1951 (age 74–75)
- Writing career
- Genre: poetry

Menna Elfyn FRSL, FLSW (born 1951) is a Welsh poet, playwright, columnist, and editor who writes in Welsh. She has been widely commended and translated. She was imprisoned for her campaigning as a Welsh-language activist.

== Background ==
During the 1970s and 1980s, Menna Elfyn was a member and sometime official of Cymdeithas yr Iaith Gymraeg. She was twice imprisoned for acts of civil disobedience. She described the ordeal of being forced to speak in the English language to her parents when they visited her in prison.

Elfyn has published ten volumes of poetry and a dozen more of children's books and anthologies. She has also written eight plays for the stage, six radio plays for the BBC, and two plays and several documentaries for television. She co-edited The Bloodaxe Book of Modern Welsh Poetry with John Rowlands, which won a Poetry Book Society recommendation. She has won numerous prizes for her work, including a Creative Arts prize to write a book on sleep (Cwsg: am dro yn ôl).

When Elfyn issued her bilingual selected poems Eucalyptus, (Gwasg Gomer, 1995), Tony Conran described her as "the first Welsh poet in 1500 years to have her work known outside Wales." He gave similar praise to her second bilingual volume, Cell Angel (1996).

Her work has been translated into 18 languages, including Italian, Spanish, Portuguese, and Lithuanian. She was Writing Director of the Masters Programme in Creative Writing at Trinity University College, Carmarthen, and a Literary Fellow at Swansea University.

Elfyn lives in Llandysul. Her daughter, Fflur Dafydd, is a writer and musician.

== Published works ==
=== Poetry ===
- Mwyara, Gwasg Gomer (1976) ISBN 978-0-85088-369-5, OCLC 877136990
- Stafelloedd Aros, Gwasg Gomer (1978) ISBN 978-0-85088-690-0, OCLC 877138151
- Tro’r Haul Arno, Gwasg Gomer (1981) ISBN 978-0-85088-797-6, OCLC 16591556
- Mynd Lawr i’r Nefoedd, Gwasg Gomer (1985) ISBN 978-0-86383-275-8, OCLC 14904018
- Aderyn Bach Mewn Llaw: cerddi 1976–90, Gwasg Gomer (1990) ISBN 978-0-86383-667-1, OCLC 831354680
- Eucalyptus, Gwasg Gomer (1995)
- Cell Angel, Bloodaxe Books (1996)
- Cusan Dyn Dall/ Blind Man's Kiss, Bloodaxe Books (2001)
- Perffaith Nam, Gwasg Gomer (2005) ISBN 978-1-84323-456-2, OCLC 59352065
- Perffaith Nam. Perfect Blemish, Bloodaxe Books (2007) ISBN 978-1-85224-779-9, OCLC 255911683
- Er dy fod , Gwasg Gomer 2007 (book for learners/learning a language)
- Merch Perygl: Cerddi 1976-2011 (Gomer Press, 2011)
- Murmur (Bloodaxe, 2012)
- Bondo (Bloodaxe, 2017)
- Edited, with John Rowlands: The Bloodaxe Book of Modern Welsh Poetry (Bloodaxe, 2003)

=== Prose ===
- Optimist Absoliwt: Cofiant Eluned Phillips (biography of Eluned Phillips) (Gomer Press, 2016)
- Cwsg: am dro yn ôl (illustrated by Sarah Williams) (Gomer Press, 2019)

== Other works ==
- Red Lady of Paviland A project with composer Andrew Powell, Musical Director Craig Roberts and the Burry Port Town Band, the centrepiece of which will be Menna and Andrew's new work 'Y Dyn Unig' (The Lonely Man).
- Menna Elfyn (ed.) Cyfrinachau by Eluned Phillips (Honno, 2021)

== Awards ==
- Major Prize for Volume of Poetry (Stafelloedd Aros), Wrexham National Eisteddfod. (1977)
- Member of the Gorsedd for contribution to Welsh Literature. (1995)
- Poet Laureate for the Children of Wales (2002)
- Creative Wales Award (2008)
- Anima Istranza Foreign Prize for Poetry (2009)
- Arts Council Prize for 'Aderyn Bach mewn Llaw'
- Longlisted for book of the year, ' Cusan Dyn Dall/ Blind Man's Kiss

Menna Elfyn became a Fellow of the Royal Society of Literature in 2015. In 2018, she became a Fellow of the Learned Society of Wales.
