= Technium =

Technium are a group of buildings in Wales that are part of the property portfolios of local authorities. They have attracted an increasing number of companies as tenants.

Technium was originally an innovation programme by the Welsh Government.

== History ==
=== Innovation programme ===
Technium was the brand name of a business incubation scheme in Wales. The scheme provides tenants with office space, business support, fast telecom links and venture finance. The concept was originally developed by a partnership between Swansea University and the Welsh Development Agency (WDA), which built an Innovation Centre at the university in 1986. The project led to the construction of the first Technium building, a purpose-built £2m facility to house general technology at Prince of Wales Dock, Swansea, opened in 2001.

In October 2001, the WDA decided to build five more Technium centres across Wales in an effort to spur innovation in the Welsh economy. In 2003, a £150m expansion of the Technium programme was a key part of the Welsh Assembly Government's three-year Innovation Action Plan.

The Technium programme's attempt to develop indigenous businesses was described as radically different from the WDA's previous inward investment strategy, which sought to attract foreign employers to Wales. However, critics have argued that the scheme is over-ambitious, with too many incubator spaces than can be filled by local academic entrepreneurship, and focuses on property development and leasing space, rather than management assistance for new ventures.

A 2009 report on the Technium initiative by DTZ showed that since the first Technium was opened, 151 tenant companies had been accommodated. Eighty-two were still in residence, 38 had moved to other locations and 22 had failed. The Western Mail argued that the scheme's performance had been "mixed at best... the tenants have created nearly 1,000 jobs, but surely they would have been created anyway and found suitable accommodation from private sector landlords."

In November 2010, following a substantial review process, it was announced by the Welsh Assembly Government that six Technium centres were to be removed from the network - Pembrokeshire, Aberystwyth, Bangor (CAST), Pencoed (Sony), Baglan, and Llanelli.

Later Technium Centres:

- Technium Digital, Swansea University
- Technium OpTIC, St Asaph
- Technium Swansea, Swansea
- Technium Springboard, Cwmbran

The Former Technium OpTIC is now a campus of Wrexham Glyndŵr University.

=== Business properties ===
After the closure of the Technium programme, a number of the original Technium buildings are managed by local authorities in Wales. These properties gave attracted an increasing number of companies as tenants.
