= List of buildings and structures in Swansea =

This is a list of buildings and structures in the City and County of Swansea.

== Buildings ==
- BT Tower
- Civic Centre
- DVLA Computer Centre
- Guildhall (Grade I listed)
- Kilvey Hill TV transmitter
- The Tower, Meridian Quay
- Mumbles Lighthouse (Grade II listed)
- Palace Theatre
- Plantasia
- Patti Pavilion
- Sea View Community Primary School
- Swansea Central Library (Grade II listed)
- Swansea Central police station (Grade II listed)
- Swansea Market
- Swansea observatory
- Tabernacle Chapel, Morriston (Grade I listed)
- Vetch Field
- Whiteford Lighthouse (Grade II listed)
- Mumbles Pier

== Structures ==
- Landore viaduct (Grade II listed)
- Loughor railway viaduct (Grade II listed)]
- Swansea Bay barrage

== Covered markets and shopping malls ==
- Clydach Market
- Picton Arcade
- Shoppers Walk Arcade
- Castle Arcade
- High Street Arcade
- Quadrant Shopping Centre
- Swansea Market

== Retail parks ==
- Morfa Shopping Park
- Pontarddulais Road Retail Park
- Parc Fforestfach
- Swansea Enterprise Park

== Historical Buildings ==
- Mumbles Lighthouse
- Port Eynon Salthouse
- Reynoldston Church
- Castle cinema
- Morris Castle (work house)
- Palace theatre
- Sketty Hall
- St Mary's Church

=== Castles ===
- Landimor Castle
- Loughor Castle
- Oystermouth Castle
- Oxwich Castle
- Penlle'r Castell
- Pennard Castle
- Penmaen Castle
- Penrice Castle
- Swansea Castle
- Weobley Castle

== Grade I Listed buildings ==
- Church of St Cadoc, Cheriton
- Guildhall
- Oystermouth Castle, Oystermouth
- Oxwich Castle, Oxwich
- Penrice Castle, Penrice
- Morriston Tabernacle, Morriston
- Swansea Castle
- Weobley Castle, Llanrhidian

== See also ==
- List of places in Swansea (categorised)
- List of cultural venues in Swansea
- List of public art in Swansea
