= Swansea City Centre =

Coordinates: 51.62017°N 3.94206°W

Swansea city centre
- Location within Swansea
- OS grid reference: SS752904
- Principal area: Swansea
- Preserved county: West Glamorgan
- Country: Wales
- Sovereign state: United Kingdom
- Post town: SWANSEA
- Postcode district: SA1
- Dialling code: 01792
- Police: South Wales
- Fire: Mid and West Wales
- Ambulance: Welsh
- UK Parliament: Swansea West
- Senedd Cymru – Welsh Parliament: Swansea West

Swansea city centre in Swansea, Wales, contains the main shopping, leisure and nightlife district in Swansea. The city centre covers much of the Castle ward including the area around Oxford Street, Castle Square, and the Quadrant Shopping Centre; Alexandra Road, High Street, Wind Street and the Castle; Parc Tawe; and the Maritime Quarter extending down to the seafront.

== History ==
Swansea's early 18th century industrial development shaped the development of today's city centre. However, the heart of the city centre was bombed severely in 1941 in what is now termed the "Three Nights Blitz". Forty one acres of the city centre and 857 premises were destroyed beyond repair. Many local businesses had to be relocated just outside the area of devastation. The small area of Georgian streets around the Old Town Hall (now the Dylan Thomas Centre) and later buildings including the former Head Post Office on Wind Street, Swansea Harbour Trust Office (now Morgans Hotel), the Castle cinema and the Carlton Cinema on Oxford Street (now a Waterstone's bookshop) are rare survivors of the former streets and buildings.

The bombing necessitated the complete rebuilding of the city centre, a task which fell upon the county borough of Swansea. Preliminary plans were drawn up in 1943, a Compulsory Purchase order was obtained in 1946 and reconstruction work began in 1947. The reconstruction task took over thirty years to accomplish.

The new centre was planned on a grid-pattern of roads including the main thoroughfares of Kingsway, Princess Way, West Way and Oystermouth Road. At the time of the initial post-war rebuilding, the River Tawe riverfront and the South Dock (now the Maritime Quarter) were still port and industrial areas, separated from the commercial district by railway viaducts and roads. With the old shopping centre on High Street flattened, Swansea's main shopping district was rebuilt around the new Kingsway.

Redevelopment continued into the 1980s, including the construction of the Quadrant Shopping Centre, St. David's Shopping Centre, County Hall, Parc Tawe and the demolition of railway viaducts at Victoria Road. These developments reinforced the city centre as a largely retail centre with only limited office accommodation and housing. In recent years, a greater mix of uses has been encouraged in the city centre with the regeneration of the Maritime Quarter, Wind Street and Salubrious Place, the opening of the National Waterfront Museum and the refurbishment of Swansea Leisure Centre.

== Economy ==
Swansea city centre provides about 24,000 jobs, or about 18% of jobs in the wider urban area. This is a low figure when compared to many other British cities, which often have around a quarter, a third or even more of their employment in the city centre. Retail, hotel and restaurant jobs are strongly represented in Swansea city centre, and there is a growing finance and business services sector, but much of the employment that would normally be found in a city centre has instead been located in outer areas of Swansea.

=== Retail ===
The city centre currently features 89,650 m^{2} (965,000 sq ft) of comparison goods floorspace (clothing, furniture, electrical goods etc.) and 22,950 m^{2} (247,000 sq ft) of convenience goods floorspace (food and groceries). According to an analysis cited in the City Centre Strategic Framework, Swansea is the eighteenth largest retail centre in the UK, relatively large for its population. However, the general quality, range and size of city centre shops is poor, so Swansea is usually ranked outside the top 50 retail centres in the UK on various industry listings. The poor retail performance is believed to be the result of several factors, including poor urban design, lack of recent development and competition from out-of-town shops at Fforestfach and Morfa.

=== Offices ===
Swansea city centre is not a major office location, although there are office premises including the BT Tower near Swansea Castle, Oldway House/Alexandra House on High Street/Alexandra Road and the JobCentre Plus building near the St. David's Shopping Centre. In 2002, there was 147,960 m^{2} (1,592,600 sq ft) of office space in the city centre as a whole, and 30,360 m^{2} (326,800 sq ft) in the retail core. Relatively low rents, generally less than £86 per m^{2} (£8 per sq. ft), underline the weakness of the city centre office market. However, an additional 65,000 m^{2} (700,000 sq ft) is planned at SA1 Swansea Waterfront, adjacent to the city centre, and rents of £140 per m^{2} (£13 per sq. ft) have been achieved here. The City Centre Strategic Framework notes that this demonstrates that a commercially viable office market can eventually be developed in Swansea city centre.

== Areas ==
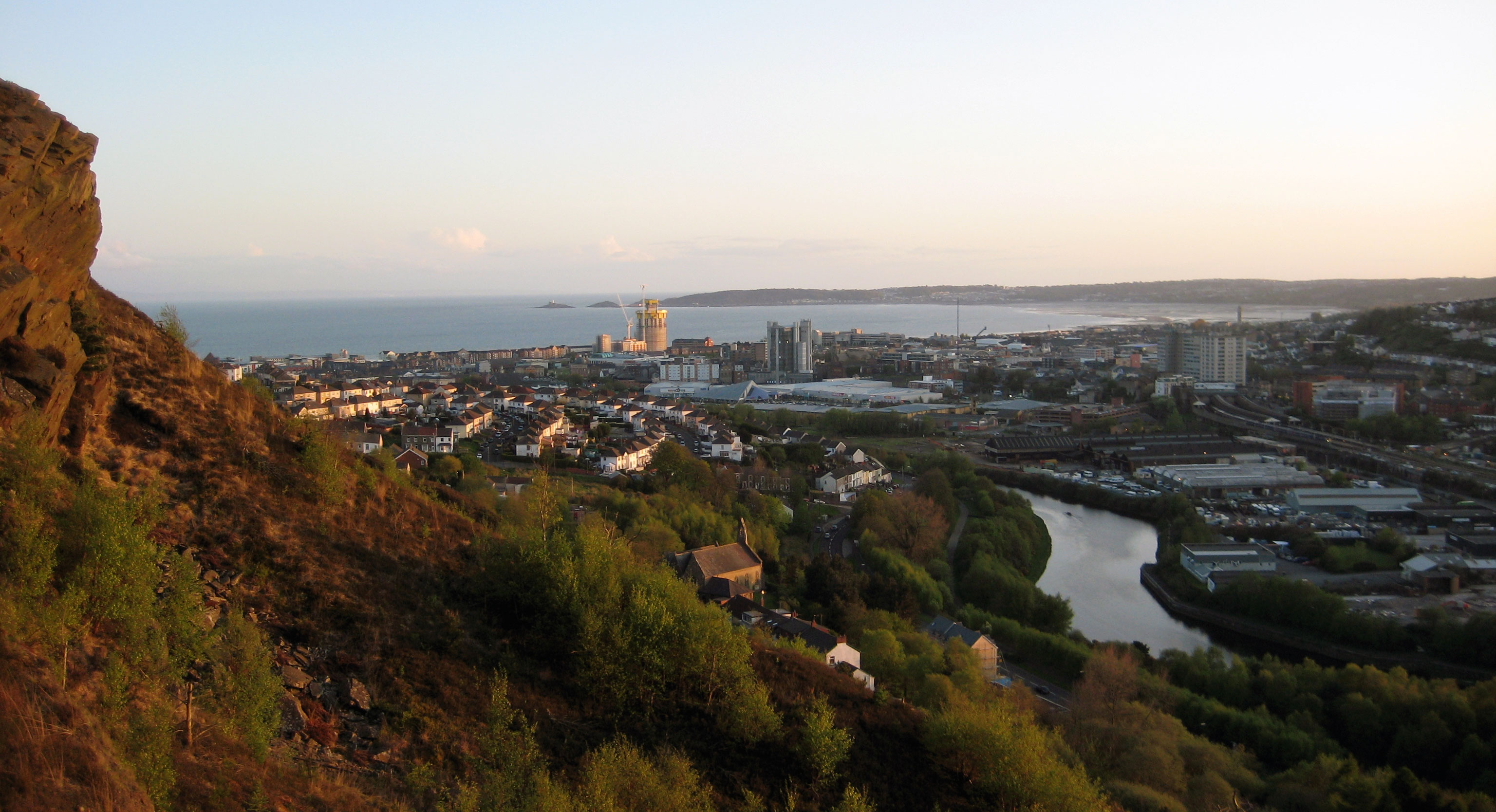
Swansea city centre and Swansea Bay seen from Kilvey Hill

=== Swansea Market/Quadrant Centre vicinity ===
Swansea Market, the Quadrant Shopping Centre and the St. David's Shopping Centre are in the middle of the city centre. The Quadrant Centre opened in the late 1970s and is dominated by chain stores; it has a multi-storey car park that opens directly into Debenhams on one floor. Swansea bus station is on the western side of the centre, and Swansea Grand Theatre is next door to the station on Singleton Street. A Tesco superstore is immediately south-east of the Quadrant.

=== High Street ===
High Street was once the main shopping street in Swansea and formed the central axis of the shopping centre. It was completely destroyed in World War II, leaving just a few buildings standing gutted, including half of the now demolished Woolworth Building, the Elysium Cinema building, the New Castle Buildings and smaller stores to the northern end including the historic Bush Inn (demolished in 2013). The High Street has a large indoor arcade filled with small local businesses.

Swansea Castle is to be found at the southern end of the street, and opposite the castle is Castle Square. Towards the northern end are Swansea railway station and the Swansea Grand Hotel. The stretch between the castle and railway station is dominated by local retailers, discount retailers and eating and drinking establishments. The street becomes mainly residential to the north of the railway station. In this residential stretch, there is one wedged-shaped building on the corner with Prince of Wales Street: this is the Palace Theatre, where Anthony Hopkins staged his first professional performance. It is the oldest theatre in Wales, one of only two remaining purpose-built music halls left in the United Kingdom, and the first place in Wales to screen a moving picture. It was once used as a nightclub but is now mostly derelict.

=== The Kingsway ===
Until the development of Wind Street as a nightlife zone, the Kingsway was the centre of nightlife in Swansea. While many of the bars have shut down due to competition from Wind Street bars, the largest night clubs in Swansea are still found here. Apart from the nightlife venues, The Kingsway has a number of banks, shops, fast food outlets and a branch of the YMCA. Swansea's former main Post Office was on this road too but moved to TGJones inside the Quadrant Shopping Centre about 250 yards (230 m) away.

In 2006, the Kingsway was re-engineered to become a one-way street for cars. The southern traffic lanes are now dedicated tw- way bus lanes developed in conjunction with the First Cymru's Swansea Metro bus route. At the eastern end of the Kingsway was a large roundabout incorporating a pedestrian subway. The subway has been filled in and the roundabout replaced with a traffic light crossroad and wider pedestrian walkways.

=== Oxford Street ===
Oxford Street is the main shopping street in Swansea which has major retailers such as Marks and Spencer and Next. The eastern end of the street, close to Castle Square, is pedestrianised and dominated by chain stores. The western end features mass-market/down-market multiple stores and links to two arcades of very small independent retailers. Further west, the street enters the Sandfields area and is mainly residential. Street markets are held on Oxford Street, Princess Way and Castle Square over Christmas.

=== Wind Street/Salubrious Place ===
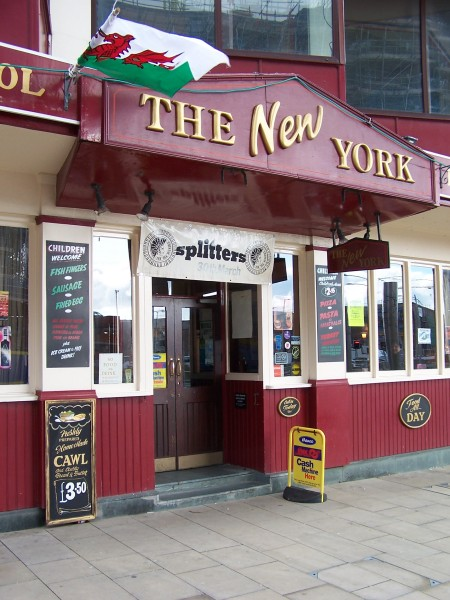
The New York Pub on Princess Way, parallel to Wind Street

Wind Street (Welsh: Stryd y Gwynt) has a name which nowadays means different things in the two languages. The local English pronunciation has shifted from /ˈwɪnd/ Street (i.e. with a meaning matching the Welsh name) to /ˈwaɪnd/ Street (which doesn't). Wind Street was once a haunt of the poet Dylan Thomas and location of the covered alleyway 'Salubrious Passage'. It became a backwater in the second half of the 20th century when the commercial centre of Swansea shifted. It boasts the highest concentration of listed buildings in Swansea.

During the Second World War, the pubs of Wind Street saw the visit of a young star-to-be. A group of American GIs stationed in Swansea entered the Adelphi pub. An Australian soldier also stationed in Swansea saw this and proceeded to taunt the young GI, who was drinking milk, that he was not strong enough to drink alcohol. Unfortunately for him he had picked on the young Rocky Marciano who went on to become one of the world's greatest heavyweight boxers. Rocky floored him with one punch. Marciano himself confirmed this story.

Following redevelopment at the beginning of the 21st century, the area is now known for its pubs, bars, clubs and restaurant. The street developed a reputation for drunkenness and bad behaviour, leading to the council introducing a curb on new pub and club licences in the city centre. In December 2010, Wind Street had the second highest number of reported crimes in the whole of England and Wales.

In 2007 the development of the street's lower, south-eastern end was completed, as 'Salubrious Place', including an Aspers Casino, a Vue Cinema, a Premier Inn hotel, parking and additional eating and drinking venues. The casino closed in 2012 and Salubrious Place went into receivership in 2013, though in 2014 new plans were announced to re-invent the area.

=== Princess Way ===
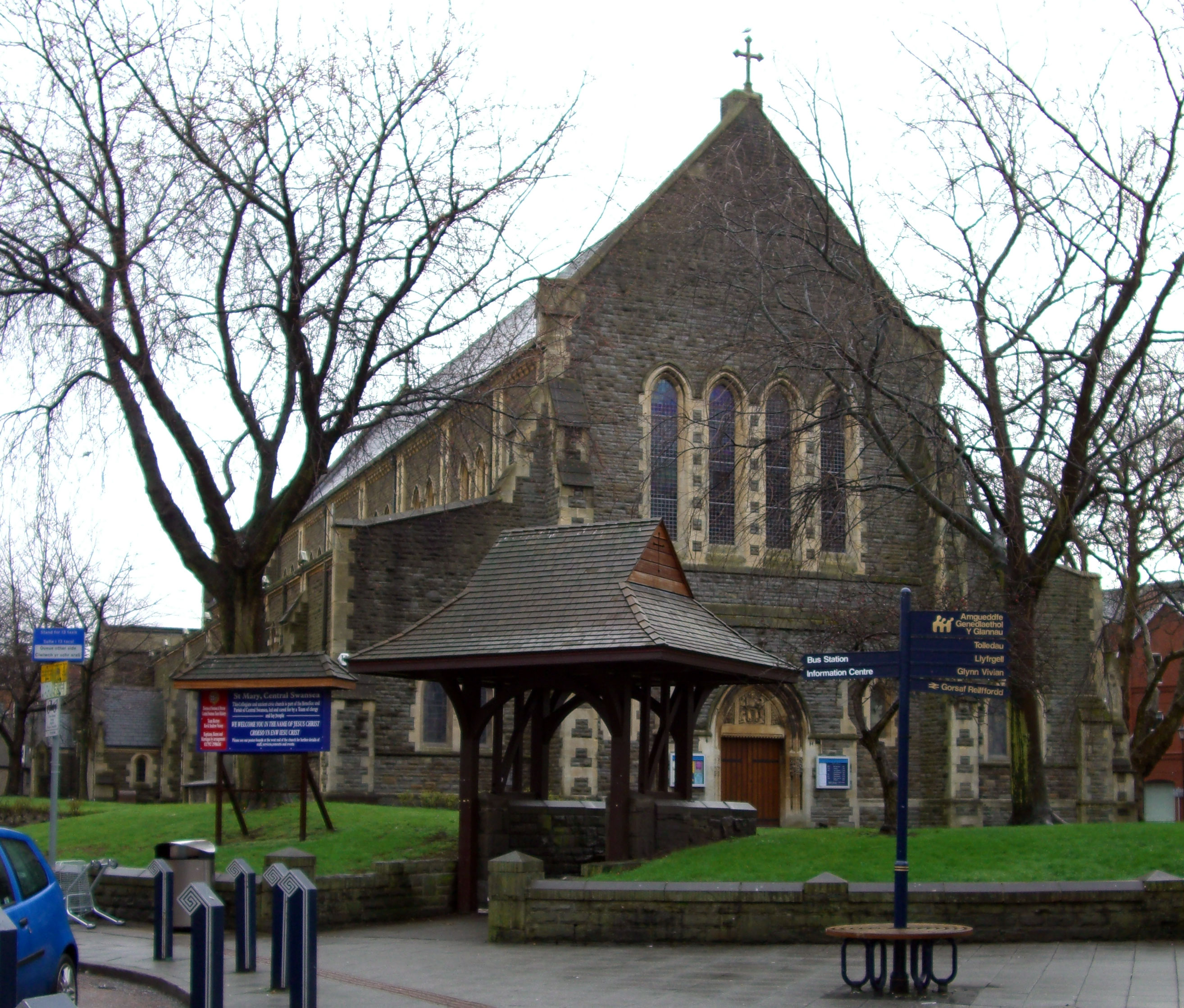
St. Mary's Church

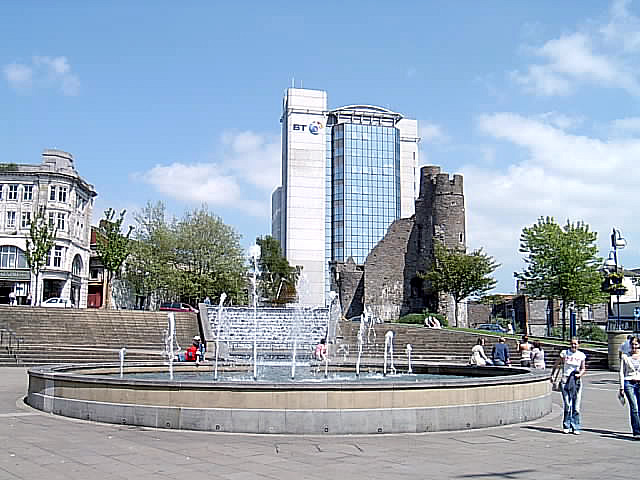
Castle Square

Princess Way (Welsh: Ffordd y Dywysoges) links Kingsway Circle to the north with Oystermouth Road to the south. The northern section of the street is fully pedestrianised and is fronted with shops. The southern section is fronted with pubs, restaurants and offices and has a Travelodge hotel, a Vue cinema and Aspers casino. The central portion of Princess Way opens onto two town squares.

Castle Square links Princess Way with Castle Street. Castle Square is a concreted square that slopes upwards towards steps to Swansea Castle to the east, forming an amphitheatre-like space. It has grass verges and a few trees on its sides, and two fountains. The square is faced to the south by Caer Street which is lined with shops in buildings with a mock Tudor facade. In July 2008, a permanent BBC TV big screen was constructed on the southern corner of Castle Square, to show BBC coverage of Beijing 2008 and London 2012 as well as local content.

St. Mary's Square links Princess Way with Whitewalls. St. Mary's Church stands in the middle of the square. It is fronted by the Quadrant Centre to the east; a clothes shop to the north; and offices and shops to the south.

=== Parc Tawe ===
Parc Tawe is an area on the west bank of the River Tawe in the Lower Swansea valley. The area includes several "out-of-town" style stores and entertainment units. There are car parking spaces in this area, but at peak periods it is subject to traffic congestion. A highly visible building is the Plantasia, a large triangular tropical plant house. Entertainments in the area include a 10 screen cinema and a ten pin bowling alley.

=== Alexandra Road vicinity ===
Alexandra Road is in an area to the north of the city centre at the foot of Townhill. It is home to a campus University of Wales Trinity Saint David (UWTSD) which has several premises in the area. Swansea College of Art's main centre is in a building that once housed the Dynevor Secondary school. The Glynn Vivian Art Gallery is here, as is Swansea Central police station. The Old Library building next to the old police station, on the corner of Orchard Street and Alexandra Road, once housed the central lending and reference library, which has now been relocated to the Civic Centre. The old police station has been converted into flats for students of UWTSD.

The old library is now part of Swansea College of Art and houses its Stained Glass, Product Design, Automotive Design, Games Design, 3D Computer Animation and Foundation courses. The BBC has two radio studios, a newsroom and general office at 32 Alexandra Road. It sub-lets part of its former building from UWTSD which now owns the building and hosts its Music Technology and Performing Arts courses. The Swansea Magistrates Court is located opposite the police station. The Mount Pleasant Baptist Church is in the far south of the area, on Kingsway.

== Entry and exit roads ==
=== St Helen's Road and Oystermouth Road ===
St Helens Road is the main route to the city centre from the south west of Swansea. The south side of the street is dominated by fast food outlets, restaurants, ethnic grocery stores and ethnic restaurants. Bryn-y-mor Road links to St. Helen's where many student bars and more restaurants can be found. The north side of the street has a number of solicitors and health centres. The road continues past the Guildhall and connects with Oystermouth Road. Oystermouth Road begins near the Leisure Centre and separates the shopping area of the city centre with the Maritime Quarter. It continues along the coast of Swansea Bay towards Mumbles. The north of the road has a number of bed and breakfast establishments near the city centre area.

=== Walter Road ===
Walter Road is the main route from the city centre to the west, including the Uplands district. Most of the road is lined with substantial three-storey town houses, many of which have been converted for use by small professional practices like accountants, solicitors, estate agents, civil engineers and surveyors. A few properties are still residential, nearly all divided into flats and bedsits.

The side streets around Walter Road are mainly residential, with mostly three bedroomed properties, mainly occupied by families. A number of properties have been converted into bedsits for use by students of Swansea University south of Walter Road and the University of Wales Trinity Saint David north of Walter Road.

=== Carmarthen Road ===
Carmarthen Road is a dual carriageway stretch of the A483 which runs NW from the Dyfatty traffic junction in the city centre. Carmarthen Road has a mix of developments including residential, retail and commercial parks and industrial units.

=== Fabian Way ===
Fabian Way, a stretch of the A483, departs the city centre to the east. It bypasses St. Thomas and Port Tennant to the north; and Swansea Docks and the SA1 Swansea Waterfront development to the south. It continues through Crymlyn Burrows where it connects with the M4 Motorway at the Earlswood junction (M4 Junction 42). This is considered as the main gateway to the city centre from the east, because of the connection to the M4 and Neath Port Talbot.

== Plans ==
In January 2007, developers Hammerson and Urban Splash were chosen for a £1 billion redevelopment of the city centre. The two developers previously collaborated on Birmingham's Bullring development. The plan by architects BDP, includes more than 60,000 m^{2} (650,000 sq ft) of additional retail space; 1,000 homes; new leisure, office, hotel and conference facilities; and a "European Boulevard" incorporating Oystermouth Road and Quay Parade.

The former David Evans department store has been replaced with a new development incorporating five stores trading over two floors, providing 5,400 m^{2} (58,000 sq ft) of retail space. Zara, Slater's Menswear and JT Morgan have signed up for the scheme. In late 2011 The Gym Group opened a gym on the first floor of the development.

In December 2008, the Council sought expressions of interest from contractors for the redevelopment of the Quadrant bus station. The Council said that it hopes to award the contract in May 2009, with work starting soon after. The project was planned to take around 15 months to complete. The new bus station duly opened on 6 December 2010, though with many finishing touches not added until early 2011.

== Transport ==
The city centre is served by buses at the Swansea bus station and by trains at Swansea railway station at the northern end of High Street. Additional bus stops are located on the Kingsway and on St. Mary's Square. A single bus rapid transit route marketed as Swansea Metro runs through the centre.

There are three Park and Ride sites with dedicated buses serving the city centre, all operated by First Cymru:

Park and Ride site	Car Spaces	Bus Number	Livery
Fabian Way, Port Tennant	550	502	Blue
Fforestfach	449	503	Orange
Landore	550	501	Aquamarine

A fourth Park and Ride site is planned for the south of Swansea with the proposed site located in Blackpill serving both the city centre and Mumbles.

== Nearest Places ==
- Maritime Quarter
- Sandfields
- Mount Pleasant
- Greenhill
- Hafod
- St Thomas

== See also ==
- Castle ward, Swansea
- Maritime Quarter
