= Mynydd y Betws =

Hill (373.1m) in Carmarthenshire, Wales

Coordinates: 51.7798°N 3.9371°W

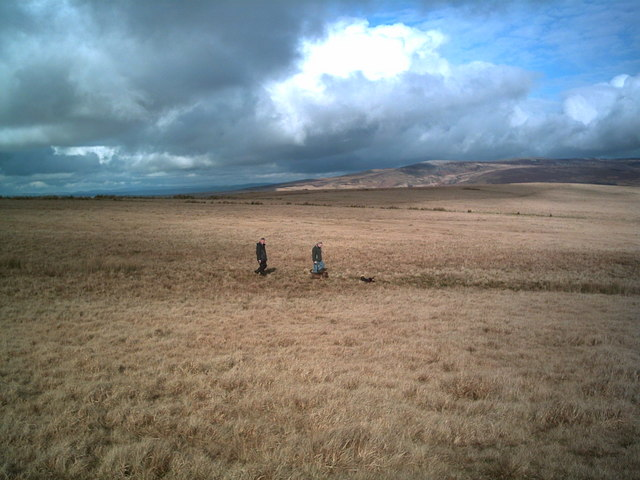
- Upper slopes of Mynydd y Betws

Highest point
- Elevation: 325 m (1,066 ft)
- Prominence: 205 m (673 ft)

Geography
- Location: Carmarthenshire, Wales
- OS grid: SN664094

Mynydd y Betws is a mountain or large hill located on the northern side of the border between Swansea and Carmarthenshire in South Wales, between Ammanford and Clydach. It is an area of upland with large stretches of tussocky grassland. The medieval castle of Penlle'r Castell is located on Mynydd y Gwair to the south-south west, Mynydd y Betws Wind Farm is prominent with fifteen 110 m (361 ft) wind turbines.

== Geography ==
A small road between Ammanford and Clydach passes close to the summit.

== Wind farm ==
Mynydd y Betws is the site of a wind turbine farm. It was granted planning permission in 2009 and started producing electricity in 2013. The original developers of the site were the renewable energy generating company Eco2, but in 2010, they sold the site to the Irish semi-state electricity utility ESB. The mast of each turbine is 70 m (230 ft) tall and the blades are 40 m (131 ft) long. With fifteen turbines, the wind farm has an installed capacity of 34.5 MW and is said to generate enough electricity to power 23,800 households, one third of the domestic usage in Carmarthenshire. The Mynydd y Betws Wind Farm community benefit fund provides grants for projects in neighbouring areas of Carmarthenshire, Swansea and Neath Port Talbot.

Between July and September 2017 the turbines did not produce any electricity, with the whole farm being put into a "paused state". This extensive outage was blamed on maintenance on the 132kV connection to the grid.
