= Alexandra Road =

Alexandra Road may refer to:

- Alexandra Road, Singapore, in Bukit Merah, Singapore
- Alexandra Road, Swansea
