= Swansea bus station =

Central bus station in Swansea, Wales

Swansea City bus station Gorsaf Fysus Dinas Abertawe
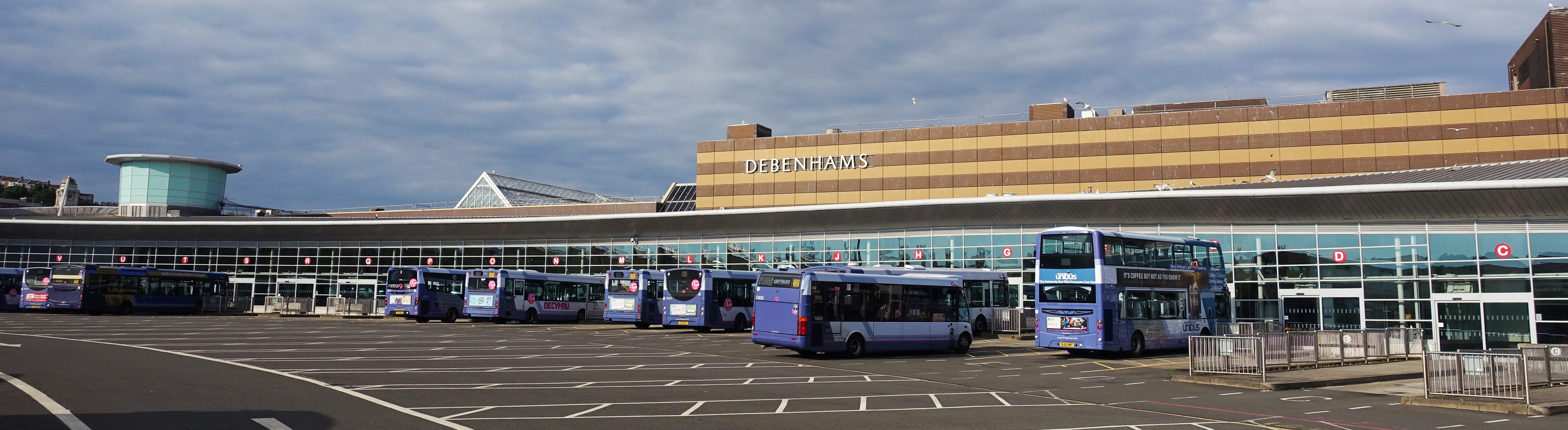
- The station in July 2018

General information
- Location: Swansea City Centre; Swansea
- Coordinates: 51.61683°N 3.94586°W
- Operator: Swansea City Council
- Bus stands: 23
- Bus operators: First Cymru; National Express; Flixbus; NAT Group; DANSA; Ridgways; South Wales Transport

History
- Opened: 1979; 2010 (rebuilt)
Location

Swansea City bus station is a bus station serving Swansea, Wales. It lies immediately to the west of the Quadrant Shopping Centre and southwest of a Tesco superstore.

The station has 20 stands for local bus services with three more serving national coach services. Coach services operated by National Express run westward to Llanelli, Carmarthen, and Haverfordwest, and eastward to London, Birmingham, Cardiff, Bristol, as well as Heathrow Airport and Gatwick Airport.

There is a taxi rank at the south end of the station.

== History and redevelopment ==
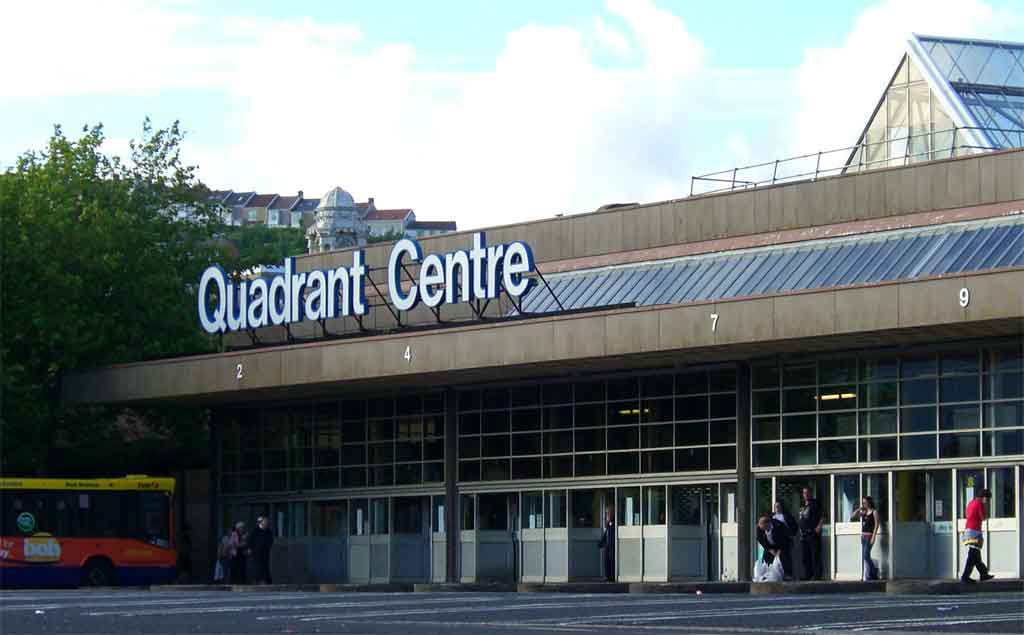
Part of the old Quadrant bus station

The bus station opened along with the Quadrant shopping centre in 1979, replacing the old bus station opposite (next to the Grand Theatre). The bus station was becoming run down by the mid-2000s and plans were put forward by the city council to redevelop the site into a more modern bus facility.

In July 2008, it was announced that funding from the European Convergence programme was approved to help with the £11 million redevelopment of the station. On 1 August 2008 it was confirmed that work on the new bus station would begin in January 2009, but it was headlined in the South Wales Evening Post on 1 December 2008, that work would not start until May 2009. The new bus station opened on 6 December 2010. New retail units were built within the bus station building but opened at a later date; these include a Greggs bakery, Costa Coffee and a Co-operative store.

== See also ==
- List of bus stations in Wales
- Transport in Wales
