= Swansea Market =

Indoor market in Swansea, Wales

Coordinates: 51.618°N 3.950°W

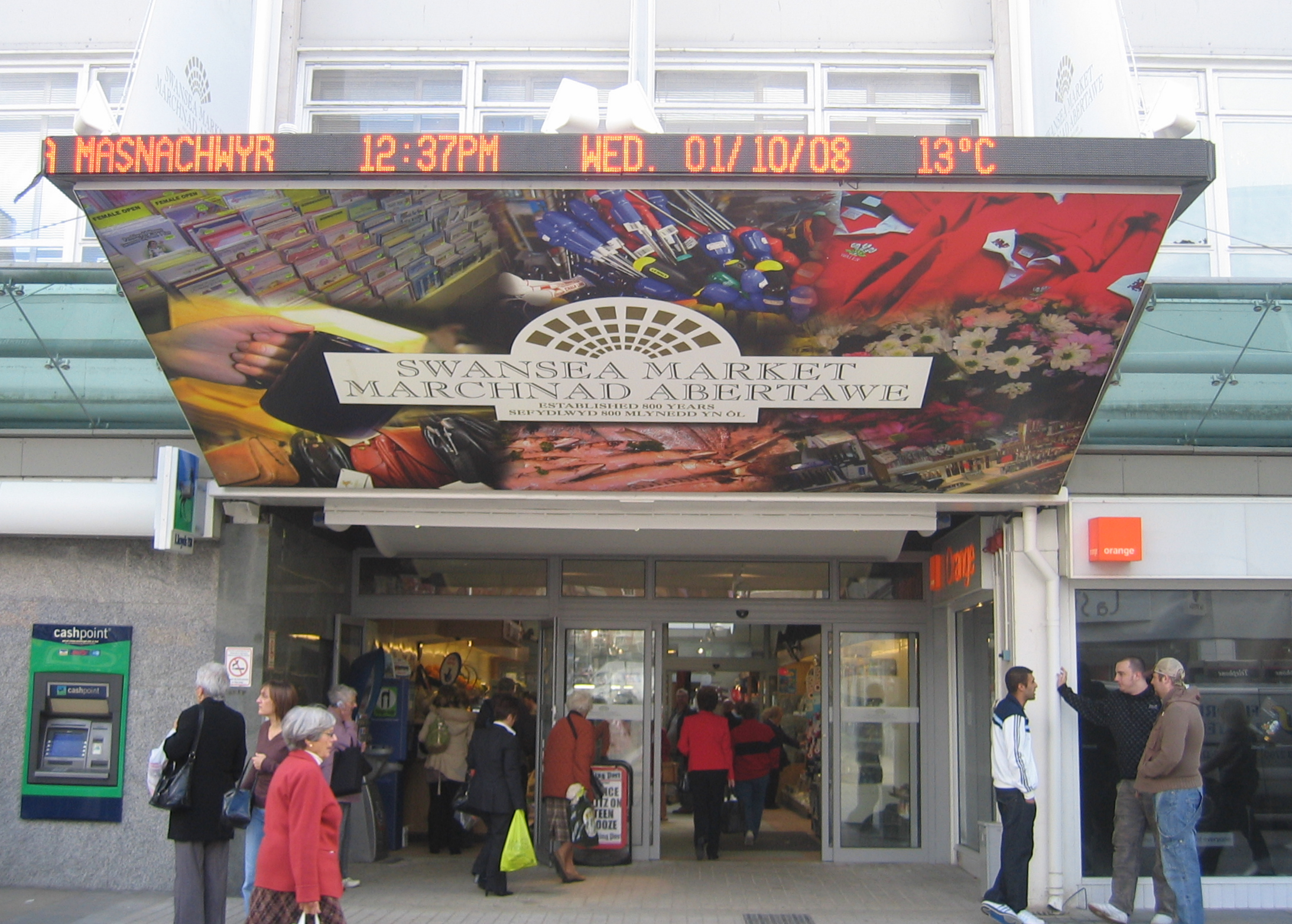
Market entrance on Oxford Street

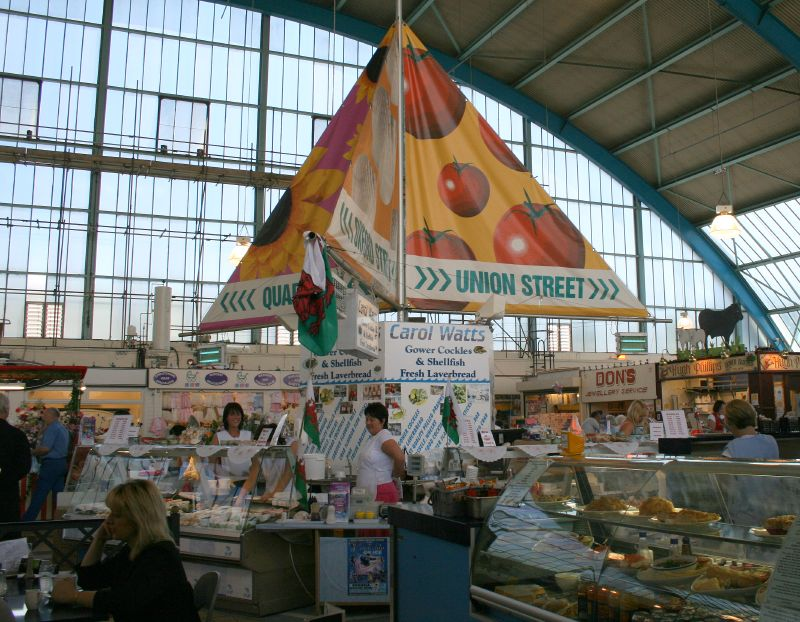
Market interior, with arched portal frame roof

Swansea Market situated, in the heart of Swansea city centre, is the largest indoor market in Wales. The market is covered by a steel arched portal frame roof clad in steel and glass. The current market was built between 1959 and 1960 by Percy Thomas. Adjoining the market is the Quadrant Shopping Centre.

== History ==
The current market building is the second market to be built at the site in 200 years. There has been a covered market in Swansea since 1652, when a market was held in a building near the castle. The previous market on this site had existed since 1894 and was destroyed during the Swansea Blitz in the Second World War.

The first dedicated market building was built in 1774 at the top of Wind Street. That consisted of a roof supported by pillars --- it had no external walls. A new market called the New Market opened in 1830, which was a walled structure with a roof lining the walls. The interior market space was open to the elements. The open-walled structure was replaced with a new red brick building, which opened on 22 June 1897. The new building was entirely roofed, and by December 1897, electric lighting had been introduced. This building was hit during the Luftwaffe bombing raids in 1941, destroying the roof and the interior of the building. During the rest of the 1940s and 1950s, the market was held as an outdoor market at the site where the market building once stood.

The replacement market opened in 1961, celebrating its 50th anniversary in 2011.

== Facilities ==
The market includes fruit and vegetable stalls, butchers, cafes, fast food, fishmongers, and clothes stalls. There are also a number of stalls selling local and continental delicacies, such as continental cheeses, Welsh laverbread, Penclawdd cockles, Gower Saltmarsh lamb, and Welsh Black beef.

In 2013, the market roof was due for a £1 million modernization consisting of new roofing sheets, lighting, and possibly new solar power generating roofing panels.

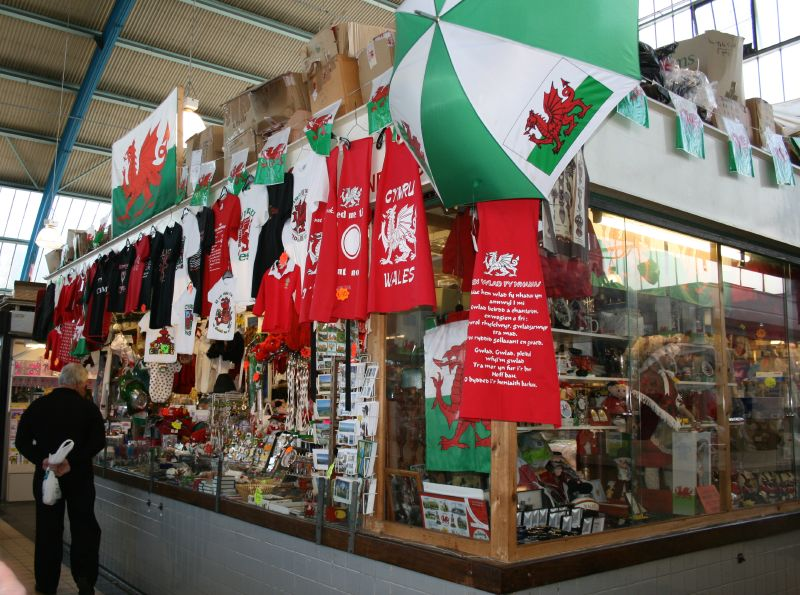

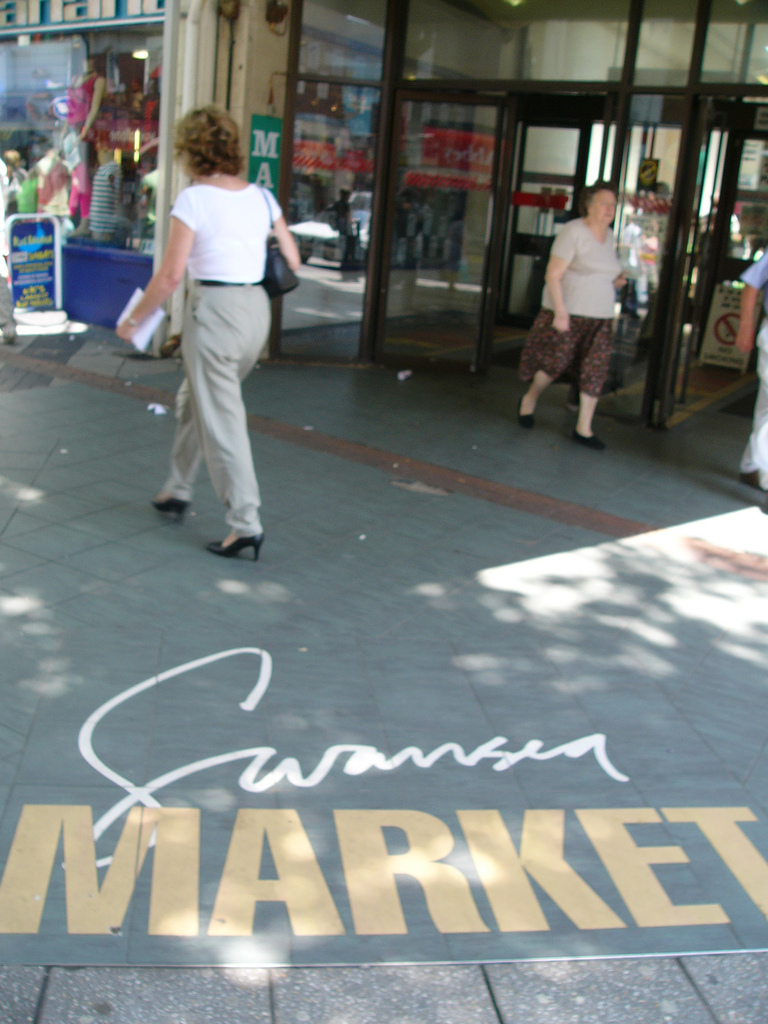

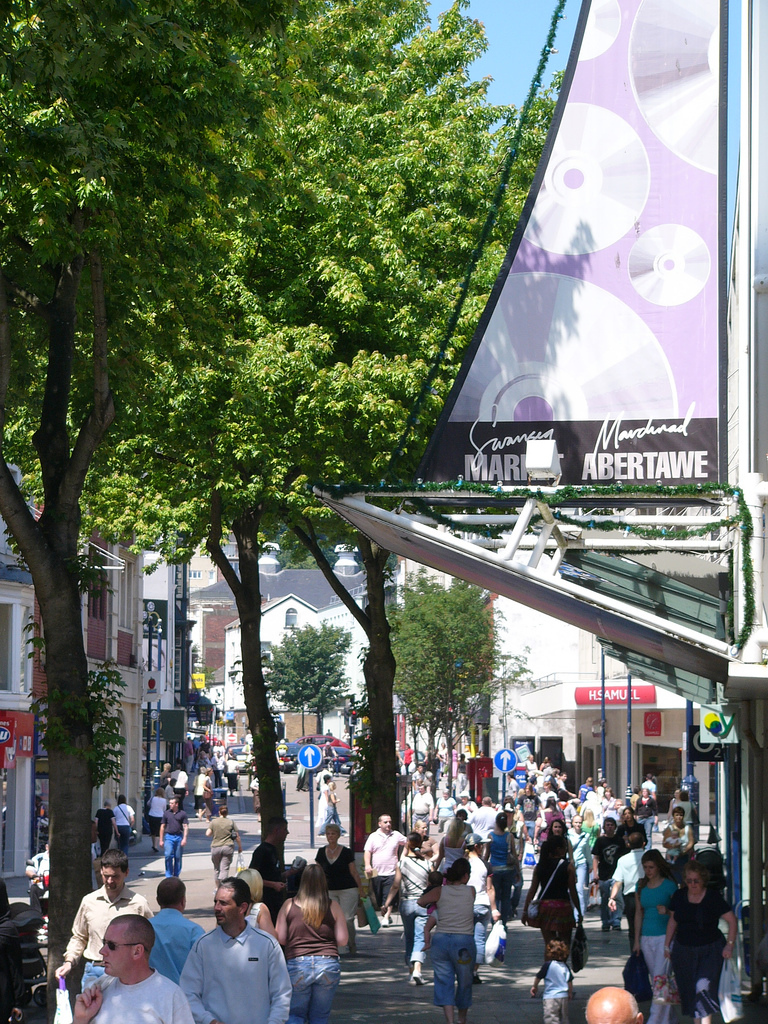
