= Castle Cinema =

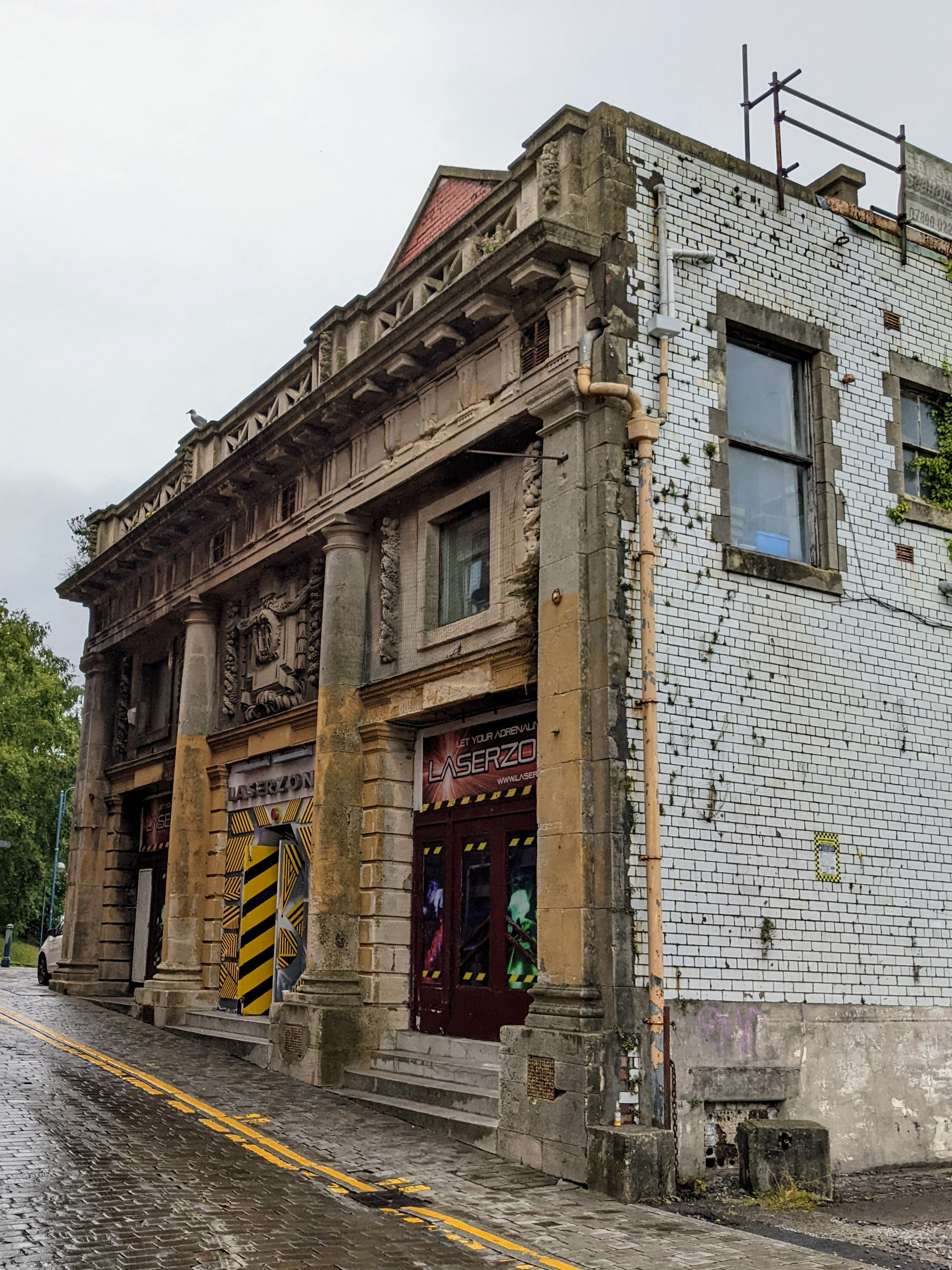
- The Castle Cinema in 2022
- Interactive map of the Castle Cinema area

General information
- Location: Swansea, Wales, Worcester Place, Swansea SA1 1JQ
- Coordinates: 51°37′15″N 3°56′28″W
- Inaugurated: 14 December 1913

Design and construction
- Architecture firm: Thomas, Meager & Jones of London

The Castle Cinema is a former cinema building located adjacent to the grounds of Swansea Castle in Swansea, south Wales. According to Kinematograph year book of 1914 the Castle opened in October 1913.

It was the only building left standing in Swansea's Castle Street vicinity after the Nazi German Luftwaffe bombing raids during the Second World War. It is a grade II listed structure.

In 1963 the Castle Cinema changed its manager (Mr. Harry Williams who had previously managed The Plaza on Swanseas Kingsway. Mr Williams retired in October 1981, aged 79). The cinema required complete refurbishment. New wall coverings and screen tabs were installed along with a cinemascope screen. Two hundred seats were removed from the back of the stalls to create a foyer which meant the small circle had no overhang. Double seats (kissing seats) formed the last few rows of the stalls.

During the 1970s the cinema showed a number of soft core porn films. By the end of the 1970s Swansea had only two other cinemas (the ODEON on The Kingsway and a small independent operating in a chapel). In 1982 the lease of the Castle was acquired by Circle Cinemas of Cardiff who renamed it the FILMCENTA and installed new projection equipment and Dolby Stereo and started to exhibit popular mainstream blockbusters. The cinema showed films that had not been secured by the Rank Organisation for its Odeon Chain. This was known as the ABC release stream. The local city council banned Monty Python's Life of Brian from being shown.

Circa 1988 UCI opened a 10 screen multiplex in the town next door to the Filmcenta. This meant that it no longer showed a film exclusively and its audience chose to go to the multiplex with its modern facilities. The Filmcenta remained open for nearly two more years before eventually closing. The last film shown was "Doc Hollywood" with Michael J Fox.

The building was converted to use as a laser gun combat-game and assault course called the Lazerzone.
