= Swansea Grand Theatre =

Theatre and former cinema in Swansea, Wales

Coordinates: 51°37′05″N 3°56′52″W

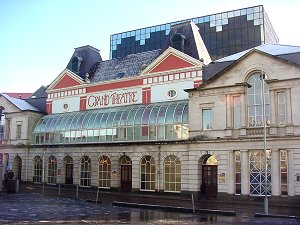
- Interactive map of Swansea Grand Theatre
- Address: Singleton Street; Swansea; Wales
- Owner: Swansea council
- Capacity: 1,000

Construction
- Opened: 1897
- Architect: William Hope

Website
- www.swanseagrand.co.uk

Swansea Grand Theatre is a performing arts venue in the centre of Swansea, Wales. The theatre stages plays, pantomimes and touring theatrical acts visiting Swansea. Swansea Grand Theatre was the base for the UK's only Russian ballet company, the Swansea Ballet Russe.

== History ==
The theatre opened in 1897. Erected on the site of the former 'Drill Hall' it was designed for proprietors H H Morell and F Mouillot by architect William Hope of Newcastle, built by D Jenkins and opened by Madame Adelina Patti - a locally resident operatic diva.

In 1968, the Swansea Grand was threatened with closure but, following a campaign led by its manager and artistic director John Chilvers, the theatre was saved. The Swansea Corporation (City Council) leased the building in May 1969 and bought it outright in 1979. The theatre was then refurbished and updated between 1983 and 1987 at a cost of £6.5m. A further £1m was spent on an Arts Wing which opened in 1999 (opened by Catherine Zeta Jones). The City and County of Swansea continues to own, manage and fund the building today.

== Facilities ==
Swansea Grand Theatre has a 1,014-seat auditorium and variety of smaller studios and rooms. The Arts Wing is the most recent development at the theatre, a space to host exhibitions, conferences and smaller-scale music and drama performances. These include Lunchtime Theatre on the last Saturday of each month, presented by Fluellen Theatre Company.

== Ballet Russe and other organisations ==
Since September 1999, the Ballet Russe, formerly known as Swansea's Pavlov Ballet, has been based at the Swansea Grand Theatre. The company, which started in Bristol, is a group of young dancers, most whom trained in Russia at the Bolshoi and Kirov academies. They work as an ensemble under the artistic leadership of the Messerer family, and are able to put on full-length performances of Giselle, The Nutcracker, Coppélia, La Fille Mal Gardée and Swan Lake, and also give gala performances including extracts from Bayadere, Carnival of Venice, Don Quixote and Le Corsaire.

Swansea Grand Theatre is also home to the Sir Harry Secombe Trust Youth Theatre, Fluellen Theatre Company, the Swansea Grand Theatre School of Dance and Mellin Theatre Arts, which hold classes, performances and workshops at the venue.
