= Weobley Castle, Gower =

Castle in Swansea, Wales

Weobley Castle
- Castell Weble (Welsh)
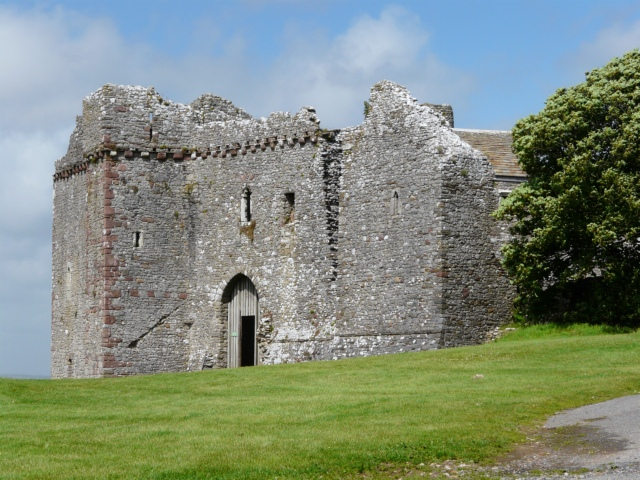

- Location within Wales
- 51°36′46.080″N 4°11′57.408″W
- OS grid reference: SS 47819 92732

History
- Built: 1304-1327
- Built for: de la Bere family

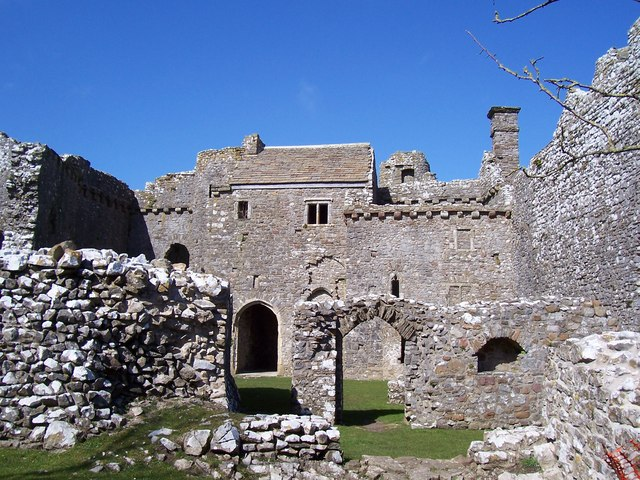
Inside Weobley Castle, looking towards the porch, across the courtyard, from the chapel block

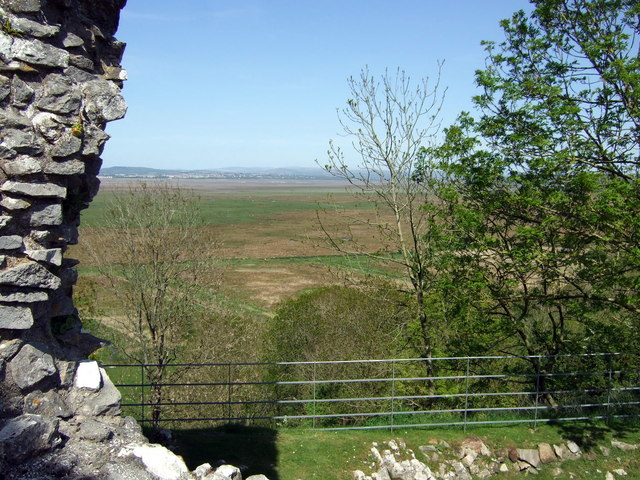
View of the Llanrhidian saltmarshes from the Castle

Weobley Castle (pronounced "weblee "; Welsh: Castell Weble) is a 14th-century fortified manor house on the Gower Peninsula, Wales, in the care of Cadw. The castle overlooks Llanrhidian saltmarshes and the Loughor estuary.

== The castle ==
The existing buildings were largely created between 1304 and 1327 by the de la Bere family. They consist of a gateway, a hall and kitchen, a chapel block and an east range, enclosing a courtyard, all now in a semi-ruinous state. The buildings are largely constructed of rubble masonry with window and door features of sandstone.

The gateway, at the west of the castle, is framed to its north by the solar block, which contained the lord's private chamber, a latrine and a cellar space. To the south of the gateway is the so-called Cistern Turret, which is believed to have contained a cistern for rainwater storage; behind this is the South-West Tower, which was originally a separate building and may be the oldest part of the present structure. The gateway itself also included an additional living chamber in its upper storey. The northern range of the castle, including the hall, kitchen and porch leading from the inner courtyard, is the most substantial of the surviving sections. Features of the hall include a recess for the display of tapestry or panelling. This supports interpretations of the castle as primarily a wealthy residence rather than a military outpost. During excavations at the Chapel Block, fragments of a piscina were discovered. The eastern range is more fragmentary that other parts, and much of it may never have been developed beyond the foundation stage during the ownership of the de la Beres. Although most of the outer fortifications no longer exist, the remaining portions demonstrate that Weobley was well provided with guestrooms and facilities (including garderobes). The building was extended later in the 14th century, including construction of the south porch.

== History ==
Until the 15th century the castle was the home of the de la Beres, originally stewards to William De Braose, Lord of Gower. In 1318 the castle is recorded by a deed signed there by Adam de la Bere.

The castle was attacked and damaged by the forces of Owain Glyndŵr in the early 15th century, but most of the building was left standing. It is possible that John de la Bere (d. 1403) was a casualty of Glyndŵr's incursion. Sir Rhys ap Thomas became the owner towards the end of the 15th century; following the execution for treason of Rhys's grandson Rhys ap Gruffydd in 1531, Weobley eventually reverted to the Crown in the person of King Henry VIII. It was then sold and subsequently leased to tenants until the 20th century, when the last owner, Emily Talbot, gave it to the state in 1911.

== See also ==
- List of castles in Wales
- List of Cadw properties
- Castles in Great Britain and Ireland
