= Palace Theatre, Swansea =

Wales' oldest surviving theatre

The Palace Theatre
- The Pavilion; The Empire
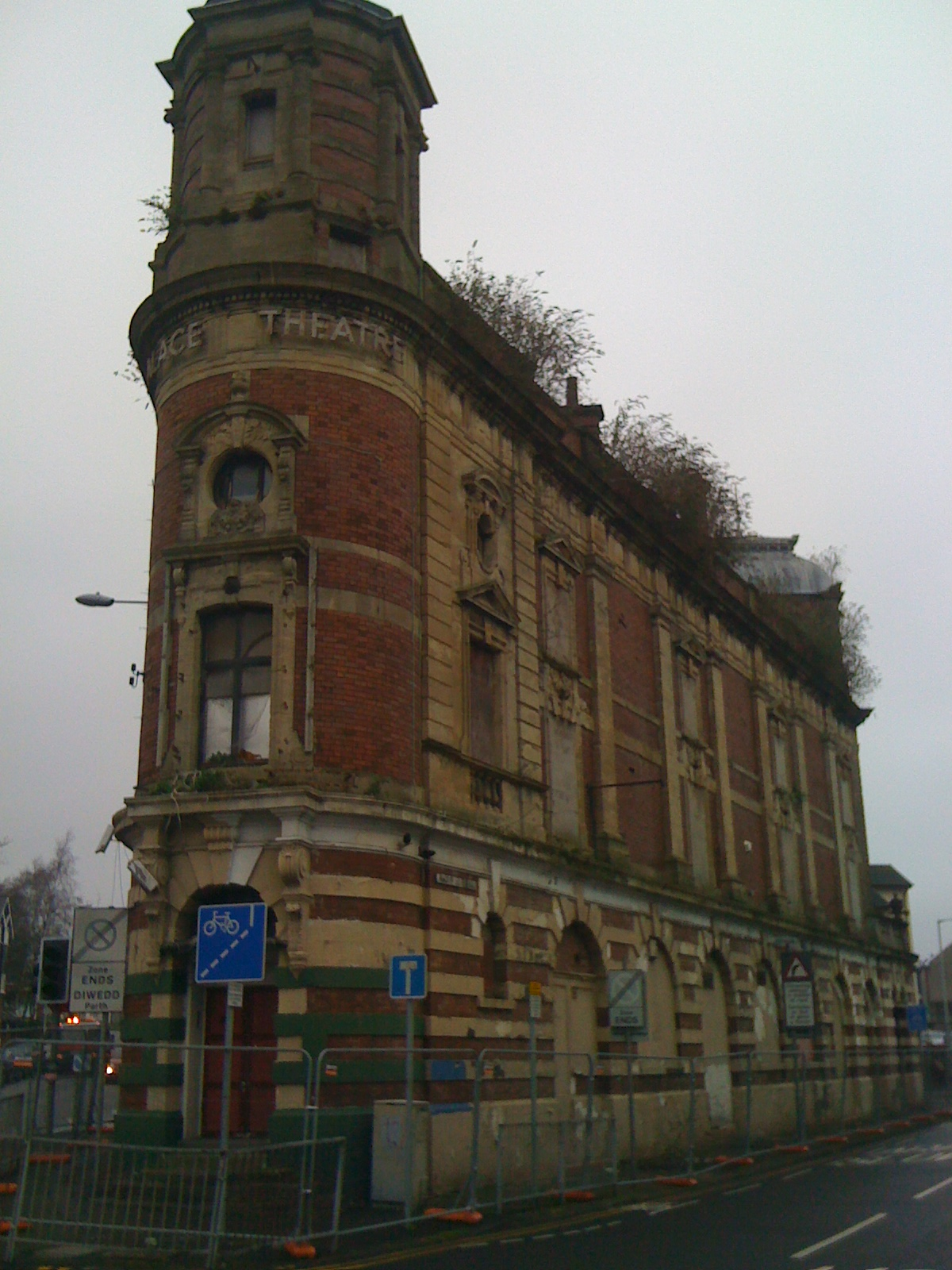
- Interactive map of The Palace Theatre
- Address: 156 High Street; Swansea; Wales; SA1 1AE
- Coordinates: 51°37′39.00″N 3°56′28.00″W
- Owner: Swansea Council
- Capacity: 600+
- Designation: Grade II listed
- Current use: Disused

Construction
- Opened: 1888
- Closed: 2006
- Architects: Bucknall & Jennings

Website
- http://www.theatrestrust.org.uk/how-we-help/theatres-at-risk/223-swansea-palace

The Palace Theatre is a Grade II listed building in Swansea, Wales, located at the northern end of High Street and recognisable for its distinctive wedge shape. It is Wales' oldest surviving theatre.

== History ==
Originally built in 1888 as a traditional music hall, the building was known as The Pavilion from 1883 to 1892, The Empire from 1892 to 1900, and then as The Palace in 1900 after a takeover by William Coutts, who also operated the city's Shaftesbury Hall, which was known as Swansea's "home of dancing" at the time. From 1912 it was known as the People's Bioscope Palace, bioscope being an early term for moving picture technology.

In the early years of the 20th century, stars such as Lilly Langtry, Marie Lloyd and Dan Leno filled the venue. Charlie Chaplin performed at the palace when he was 10 years old in 1899. In the 1920s and 30s the venue started holding live theatre events, before shifting into film from the 1930s to 1950s.

The building is one of just two purpose-built music halls left standing in the whole of the UK, and was the first place in Wales to show a silent picture. It remained undamaged by the blitz that destroyed much of Swansea city centre during the Second World War. Sir Anthony Hopkins made his first professional stage appearance there in 1960 with Swansea Little Theatre's production of Have A Cigarette.

The venue later operated as a bingo hall, and as a private gay club. The ground-floor bar and lounge was also used as a licensed pub for many years, before closing in 2006. Eventually the theatre was sold for £300,000 to a property company, but in 2010 it was still derelict and actor Edward Fox joined a campaign to have it restored.

== New campaign ==
In October 2013 the BBC reported on issues with the building. The Theatres Trust warned that the building "may fall down" if it did not receive any investment, Swansea Council cabinet member for regeneration Nick Bradley told the BBC that renovation would be very expensive, and as a result any Council or Government intervention was unlikely. He warned that regarding costs of redevelopment, "£1m wouldn't even touch it."

In 2014, a new campaign for redevelopment of the site was launched on Facebook.

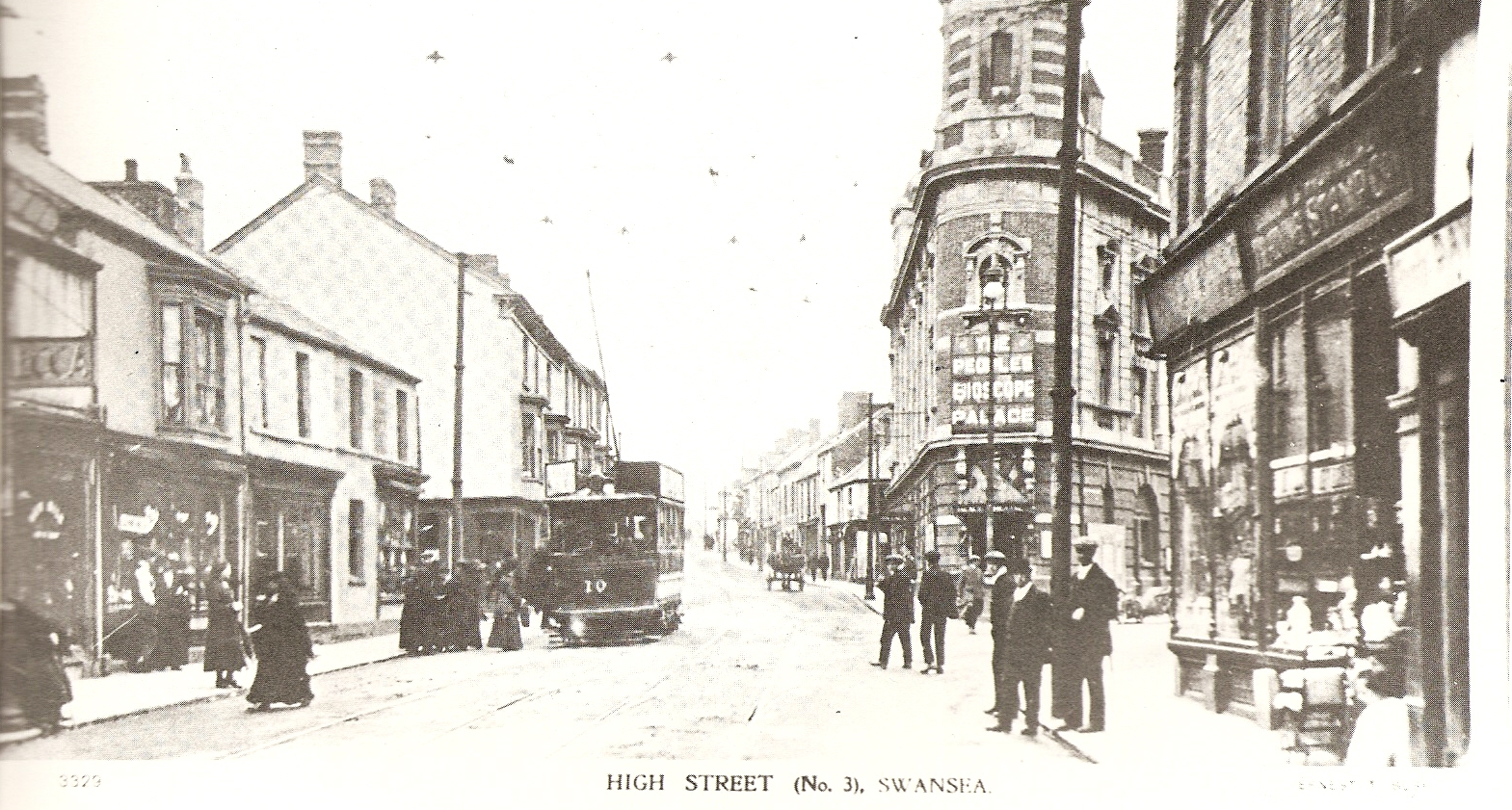
High Street in 1915

In April 2014 Swansea Council made £75,000 available to the owners to carry out work on the High Street theatre, which had been named as one of the 10 most endangered Victorian and Edwardian buildings in England and Wales. The Victorian Society called it "a victim of urban decay". The council funds were earmarked for "emergency works", including making the building watertight, removing vegetation and removing loose brickwork that could be deemed "unsafe". By September 2014 the council issued a reminder to the owners that the work needed to be completed promptly.

In 2018 the derelict theatre was identified as having become "at the hub of the city's street sex trade", after residents of High Street complained that they were no longer able to walk past the building in safety.

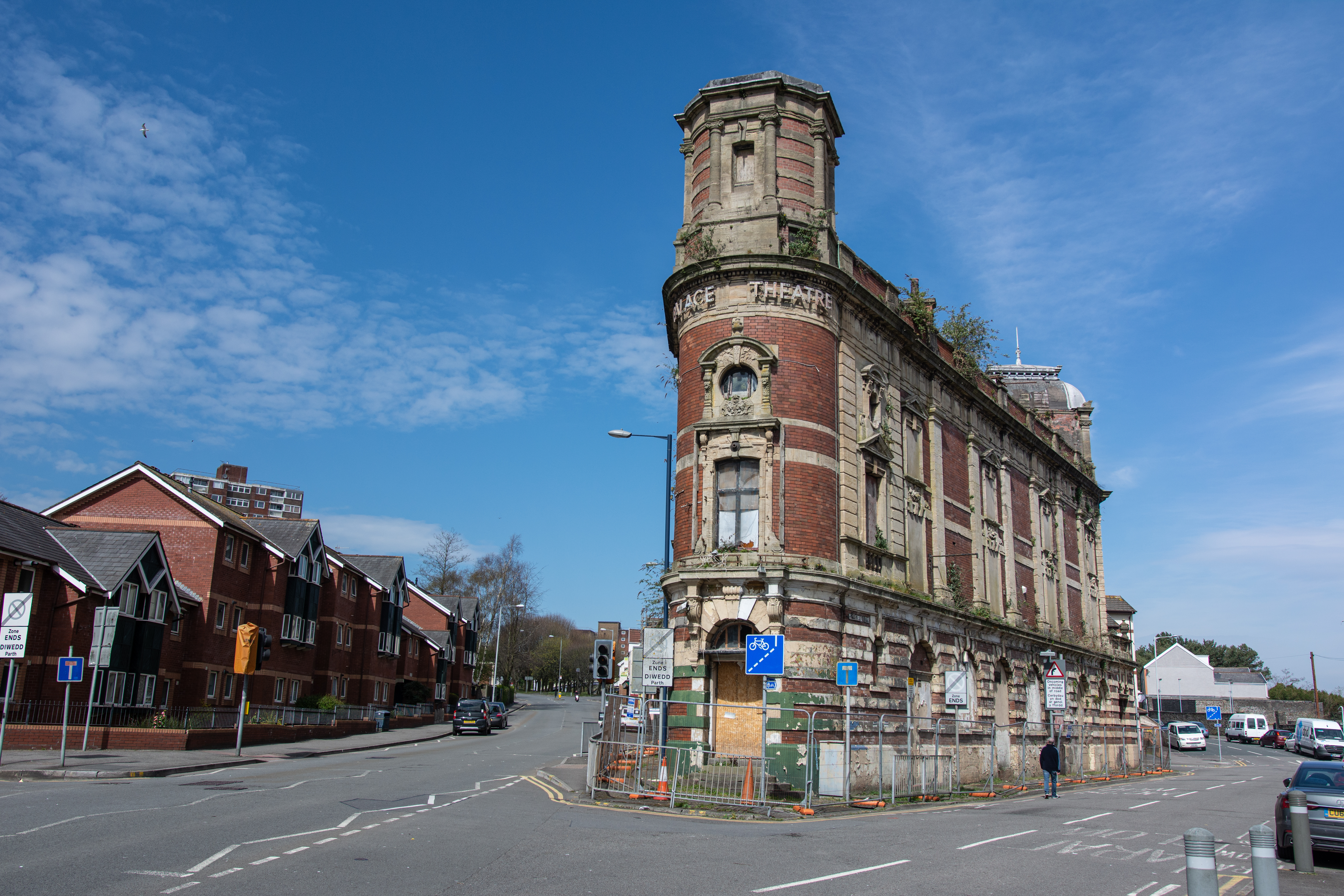
The Theatre as of April 2020

In July 2019 the future of the theatre was discussed as part of a public "Emergency Summit", organised by Swansea Council, South Wales Police, Geraint Davies MP, and voluntary sector organisations. The summit was prompted by a spate of incidents in the city including an assault on 20 July on High Street which saw the death of a 54-year-old man. Swansea Council stated that it was yet to secure a development partner for the then privately owned Theatre. According to the Theatres Trust it remained "in a poor state of repair and extremely vulnerable", although developments "provided hope that a viable solution, which includes community use and preserves the main body of the auditorium, could be found".

In September 2019 the Mid and West Wales Fire and Rescue Service were called out to the theatre amid reports of smoke coming from the ground and fourth-floor windows of the building. Responders dealt with a fire, but did not initially comment on whether the incident was suspicious. In late 2019 and early 2020 a plan emerged to save the former theatre, which would see it transformed into offices with community and performance space provided. In 2024 the building reopened after a 5-year renovation, and is operated by Tramshed Tech but owned by Swansea Council.
