= Quadrant Shopping Centre =

Shopping centre in Swansea, Wales

Coordinates: 51.618°N 3.945°W

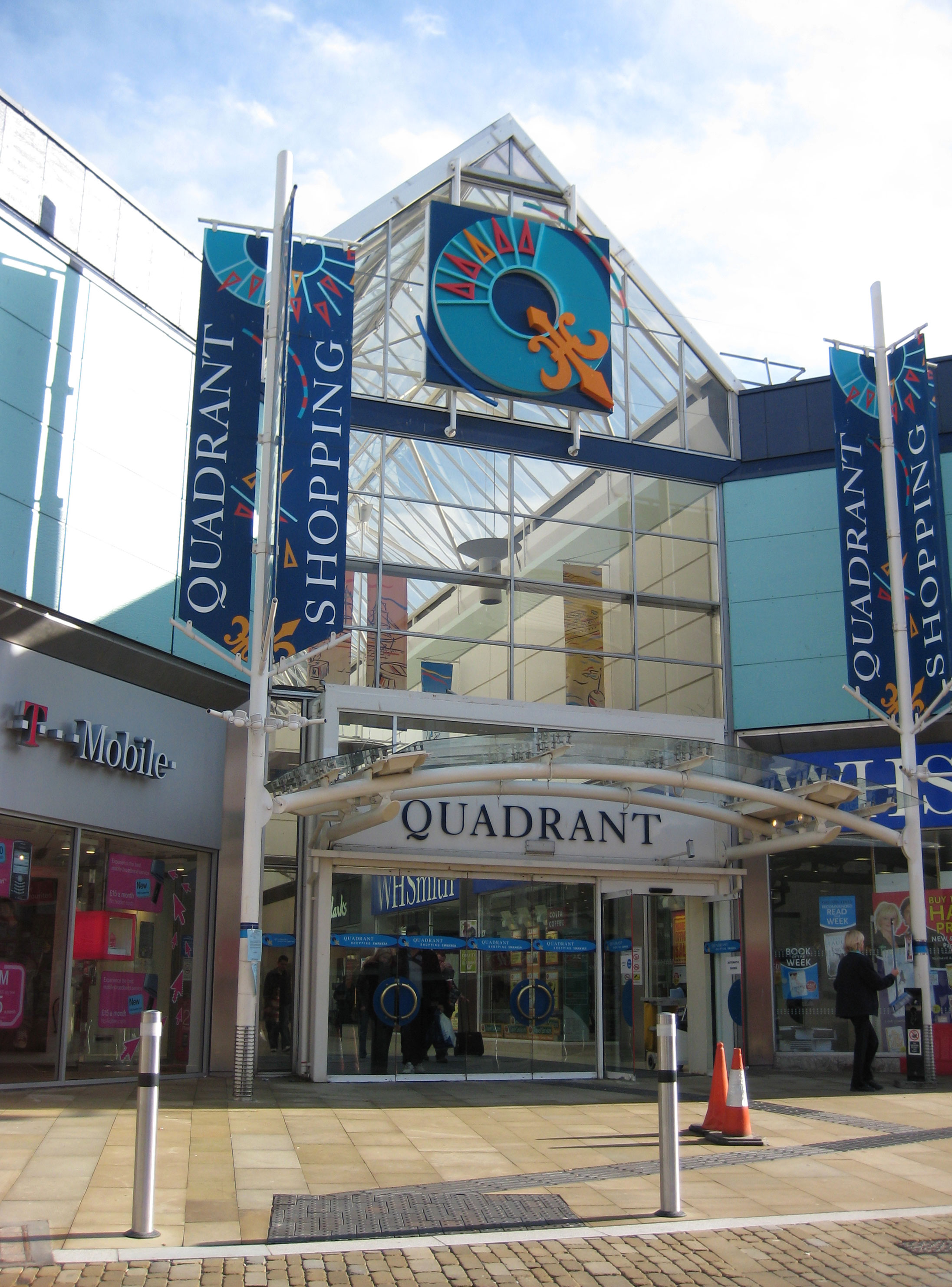
Union street entrance to Quadrant Shopping Centre

The Quadrant Shopping Centre is the principal under-cover shopping centre in Swansea, Wales. The centre opened in 1979. From the 1980s to 2019 it was home to the Swansea Devil, a controversial carved wooden statue of the Devil.

The centre and surrounding areas are owned by the LaSalle Investment Management.

== Stores ==
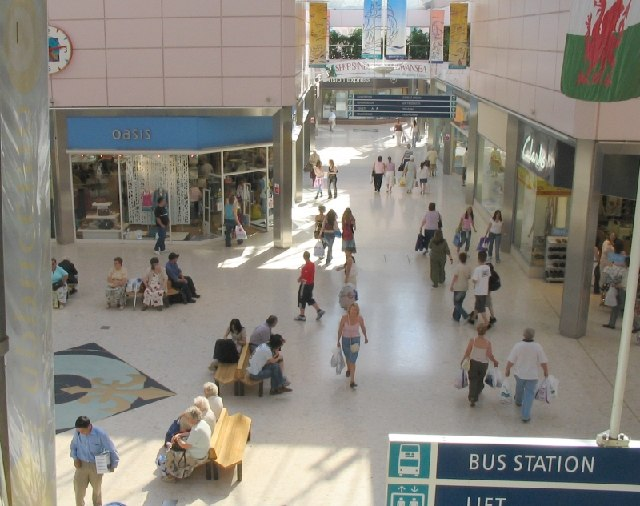
Inside the Quadrant Shopping Centre

The centre has a floorspace of 41,000 m^{2} (440,000 sq ft) and is anchored by TGJones and Boots. Other notable stores include HMV and Clarks.

== The building ==
The centre's main distinctions are its glass roof structure and its square atrium at the centre, which is now leased out to seasonal businesses, mainly during festive periods. The centre was last redeveloped in the early 1990s, but much of the upper floor decor consists of open brickwork from the 1980s.

There are two levels in the Quadrant; Boots Group and TGJones are the only stores occupying the upper level, along with the public conveniences and 'The Gallery', a cafe that overlooks the central area.

== Surroundings ==
The Quadrant is directly adjacent to Swansea Market, Swansea bus station and a multi-storey car park. The less successful St. David's Shopping Centre complex is situated to the east; the St David's/Quadrant area is highlighted by the Council as the key priority for the regeneration of Swansea city centre.
