= Tabernacle Chapel, Morriston =

Coordinates: 51°39′48″N 3°55′30″W

Tabernacle Chapel
- Capel y Tabernacl
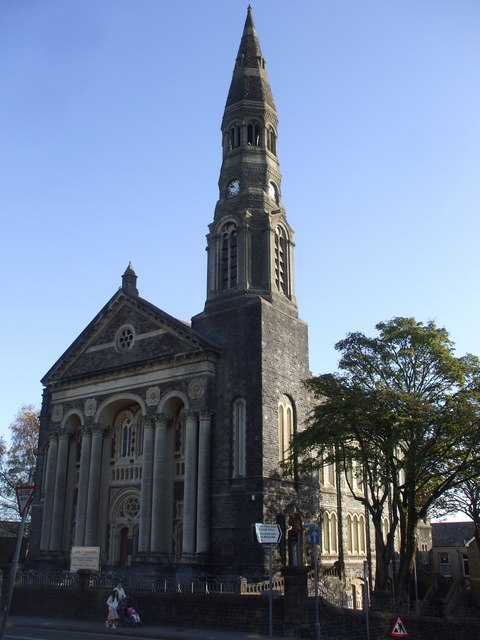
- Tabernacle Chapel
- Location: Morriston, Swansea
- Country: Wales
- Denomination: Union of Welsh Independents
- Website: morristontabernacl.org

Architecture
- Heritage designation: Grade I
- Designated: 30 September 1993
- Architect: John Humphrey
- Years built: 1874-1877, additions through 1890
- Completed: 1872

The Tabernacle Chapel (Capel y Tabernacl in Welsh), also known as Libanus Chapel, is a Grade I listed chapel on Woodfield Street in Morriston, Swansea, Wales.

== History ==
Designed by the architect John Humphrey and built at a cost of £15,000 in 1872 (equivalent to £2 million in 2024). The debt incurred was paid off over more than forty years, with a special service held on New Years Day 1914 to celebrate clearing the debt

The chapel has seating for 3,000 and has been called the "Nonconformist Cathedral of Wales".

The design was copied many times elsewhere in Wales. The pulpit is the focus and below this is the Sedd Fawr (big seat) for the deacons. The Welsh language inscription above the organ reads Addolwch yr Arglwydd mewn Prydferthwch Sancteiddrwydd (Worship ye the Lord in the Beauty of Holiness), from Psalm 96.

It is used for practice and performance by two local choirs: the Tabernacle Morriston Choir and the Morriston Ladies Choir.

During restoration work in 2012, workers recovered a sixpenny piece placed under the original pinnacle – an unusual feature in a Nonconformist church – in 1872 by the daughter of the builder, industrialist Daniel Edwards.

== Gallery ==
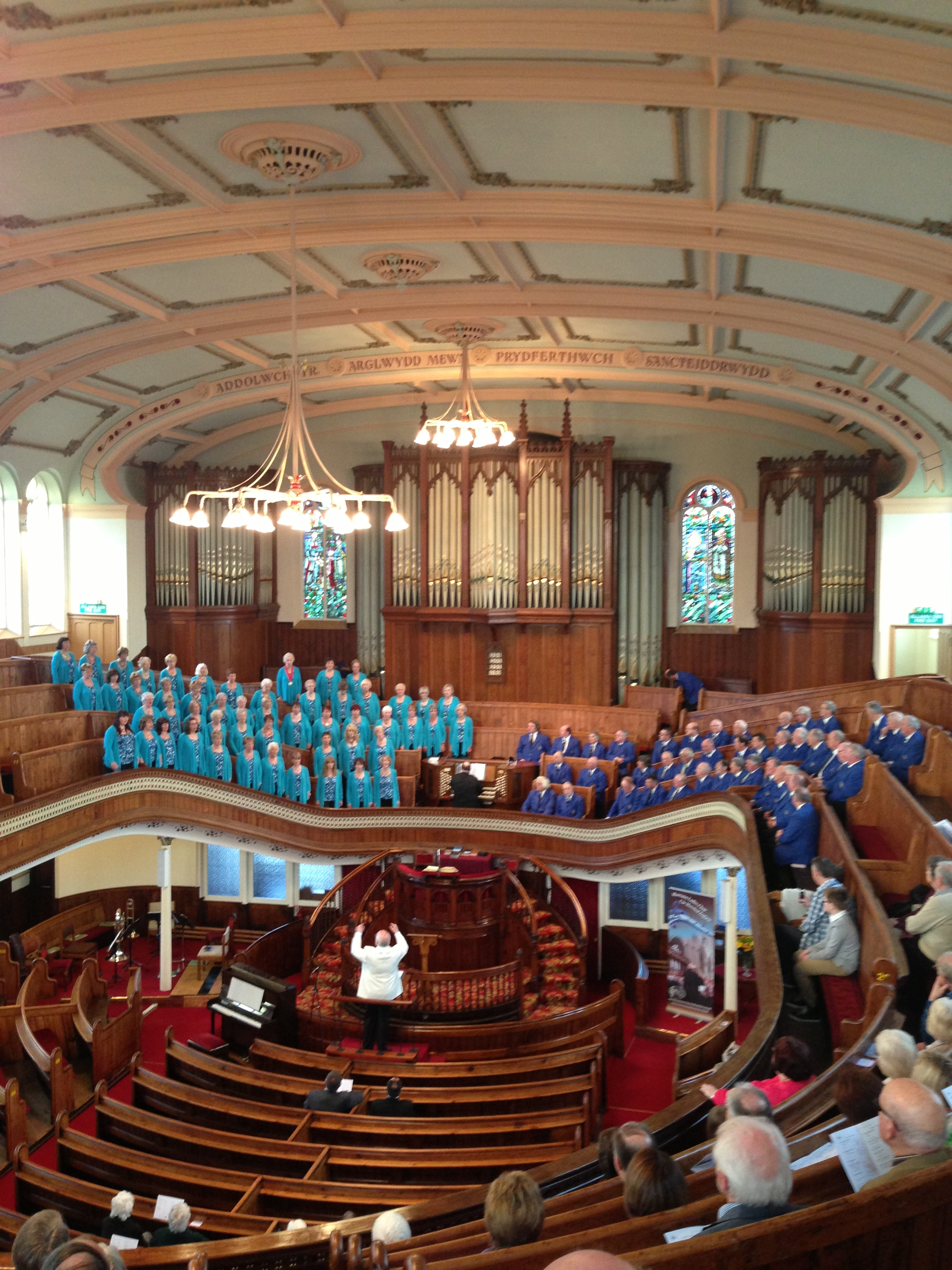
The chapel interior during a choral concert, 2013

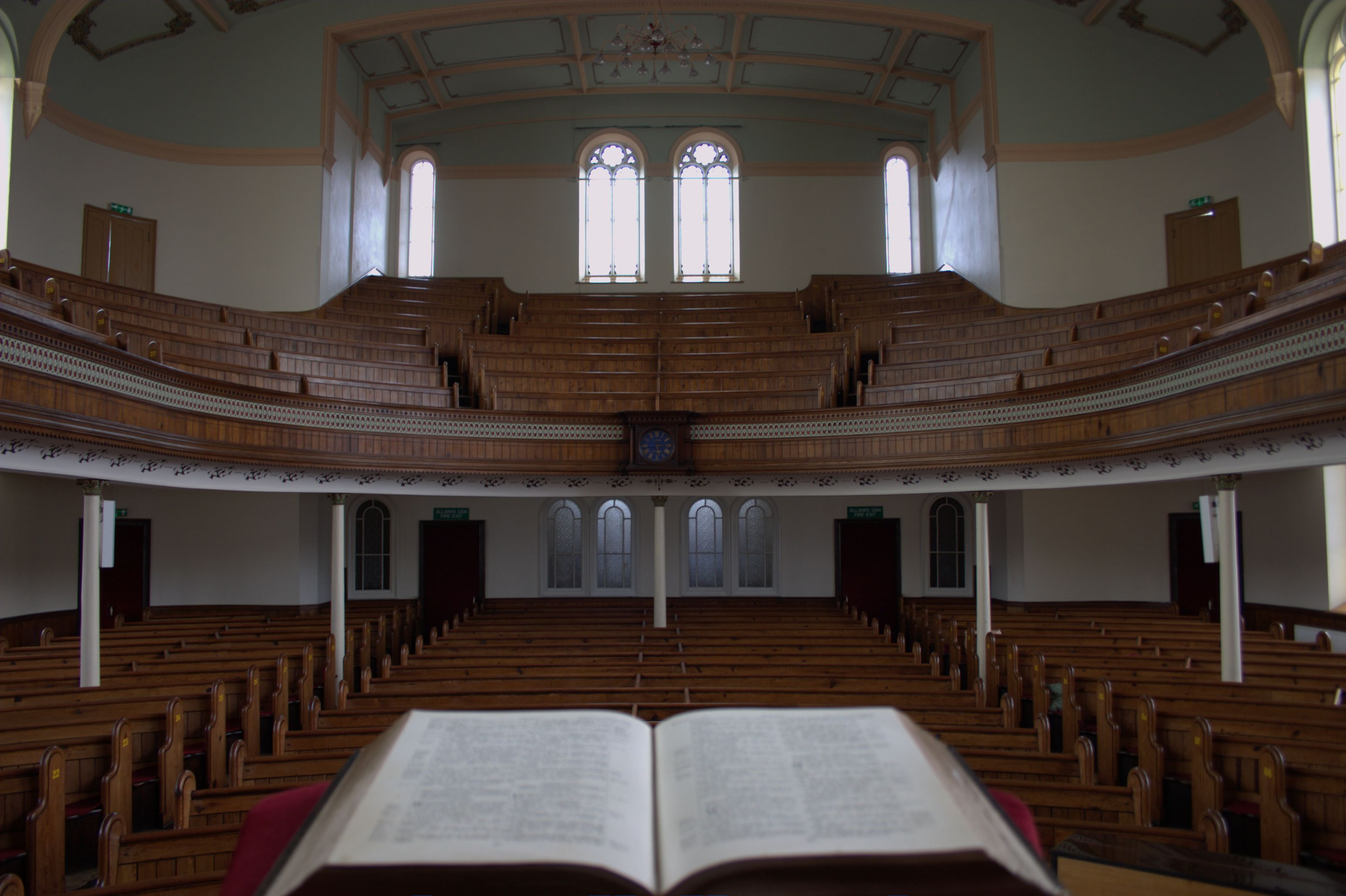
View from the pulpit
