= Penlle'r Castell =

Coordinates: 51.7691°N 3.9356°W

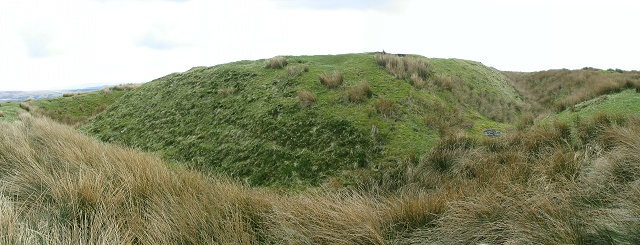
Ditch and bank of Penlle'r Castell

Penlle'r Castell is an historic ruin on the summit of Mynydd y Gwair in the far north of the City and County of Swansea. The Penlle'r Castell site was probably a late 13th-century stronghold garrisoned by one of the Marcher Lords.

Penlle'r Castell is located 1213 feet above sea level. The meaning of the name in English is "summit of the place of the castle".

== History ==
It has been suggested that the castle may have been established by William de Braose, 2nd Baron Braose in the years immediately preceding 1252. However, there is no firm evidence as to the date of its construction, but it is believed to be the fortification referred to as the "New Castle of Gower" which was attacked and destroyed in 1252. There is only one other castle of that period in the northern uplands of Gower, Cae Castell, and its location and form preclude it being the "new castle" in question. Penlle'r Castell is in an ideal position for monitoring the actions of the lords of Is Cennan, resident on the north side of the River Amman, and preventing their encroachment into northern Gower via this important ridge route. It would have been a purely military fortification, a blockhouse from which a troop of mounted men could harry raiding parties and send warnings to Swansea of any military incursions.

== The site ==
Now visible at this site are a series of impressive earthworks with deep ditches and some fragments of the stone buildings that must have topped them. It may have had two stone towers, probably made of dry stone walls because there are no signs of any mortar having been used. It may not have been permanently occupied.

== Sources ==
- Castleswales.com:Penller'r Castle
- GeoNames: Penller Castell
- Geograph: Plaque on Penlle'r Castell
- CASTELL Local Features West: Gower Walks
- The Gatehouse: Penller Castell
- Gathering The Jewels - Aerial photography of Penlle'r Castell
