= The Tower, Meridian Quay =

Residential tower in Swansea, Wales

Coordinates: 51.6139°N 3.9432°W

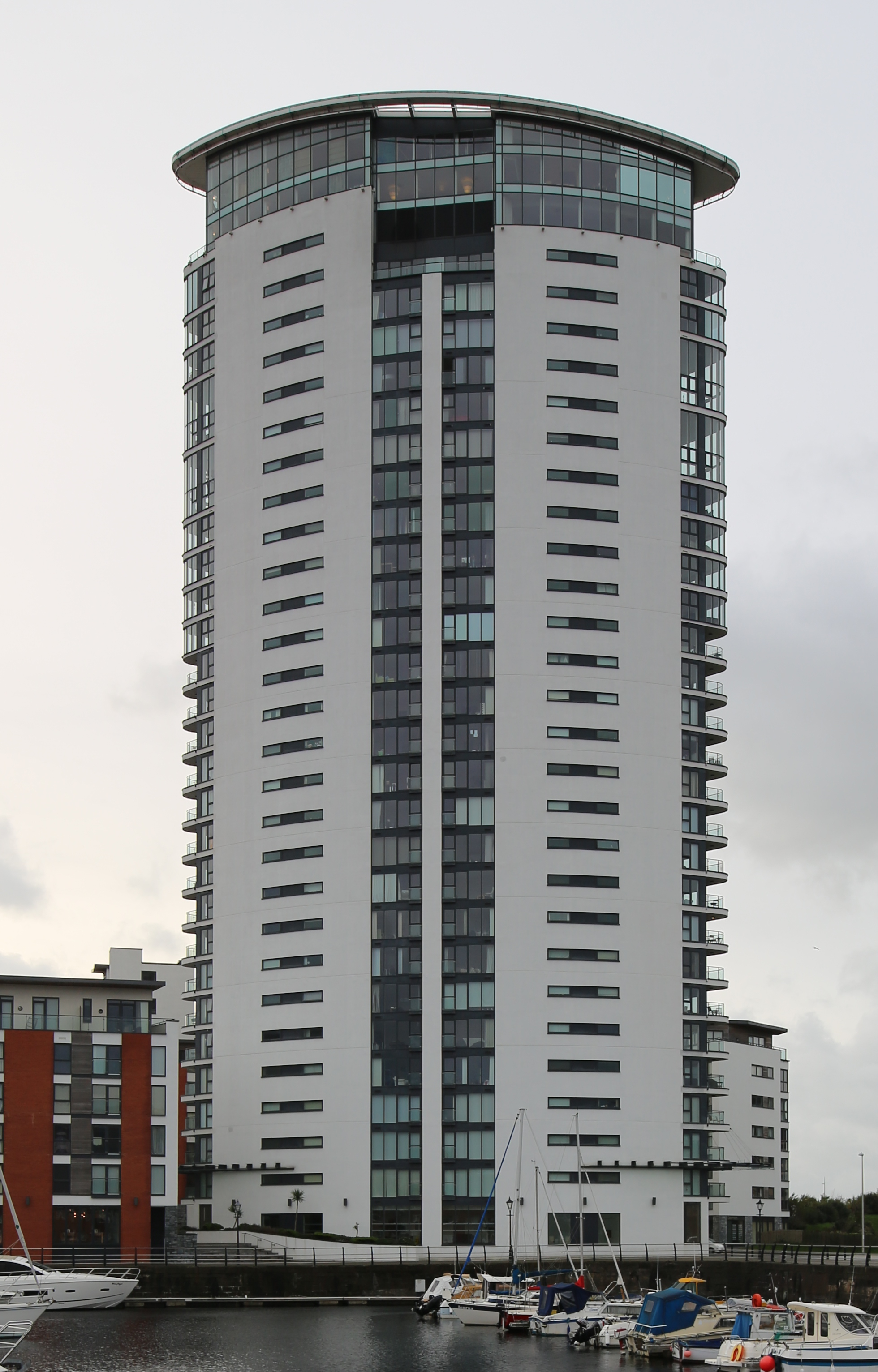
- The Tower, Meridian Quay November 2015
- Interactive map of the The Tower, Meridian Quay area

General information
- Location: Swansea, Wales, United Kingdom, Meridian Quay, Maritime Quarter, Swansea
- Construction started: 2006
- Completed: 2009
- Cost: £40m

Height
- Height: 107 m (351 ft)

Technical details
- Floor count: 29

Design and construction
- Architect: Latitude Architects
- Structural engineer: Atkins Ltd
- Services engineer: Atkins Ltd
- Civil engineer: Atkins Ltd
- Main contractor: Carillion

The Tower, Meridian Quay is a residential tower in Swansea, Wales. It is the tallest building in Wales. Standing at 107 metres (351 ft), Meridian Quay is the only skyscraper in Wales, and one of several high-rises in Swansea.

Initially known as Ferrara Tower, it was part of the £50 million Meridian Quay housing and office development project. A planning application for the £40 million building was approved in 2003 and construction work began in 2006. On 26 January 2008, one of the construction workers died after falling three storeys from the tower. The construction company, Carillion, chose not to release his name. A fire broke out on the 20th floor of the tower in April 2008 and took 45 minutes to extinguish. The tower was topped out to its full height on 12 September 2008.

The tower has 29 storeys, more than twice that of the previous tallest building in Swansea – the BT Tower. Most of the tower houses residential apartments. The ground floor has a concierge desk which is staffed 24 hours a day, whilst the top three floors form the Altitude28 Restaurant & Sky Bar, opened December 1st 2024 to replace the previous restaurant Grape and Olive.

== History ==
In 2008, the penthouse apartment on the 26th floor was sold for £1 million.

The 290-cover restaurant on the top of the tower was known as Penthouse before being taken over by Brains Brewery and renamed the Grape and Olive. The restaurant ceased trading in January 2023.

== Gallery ==
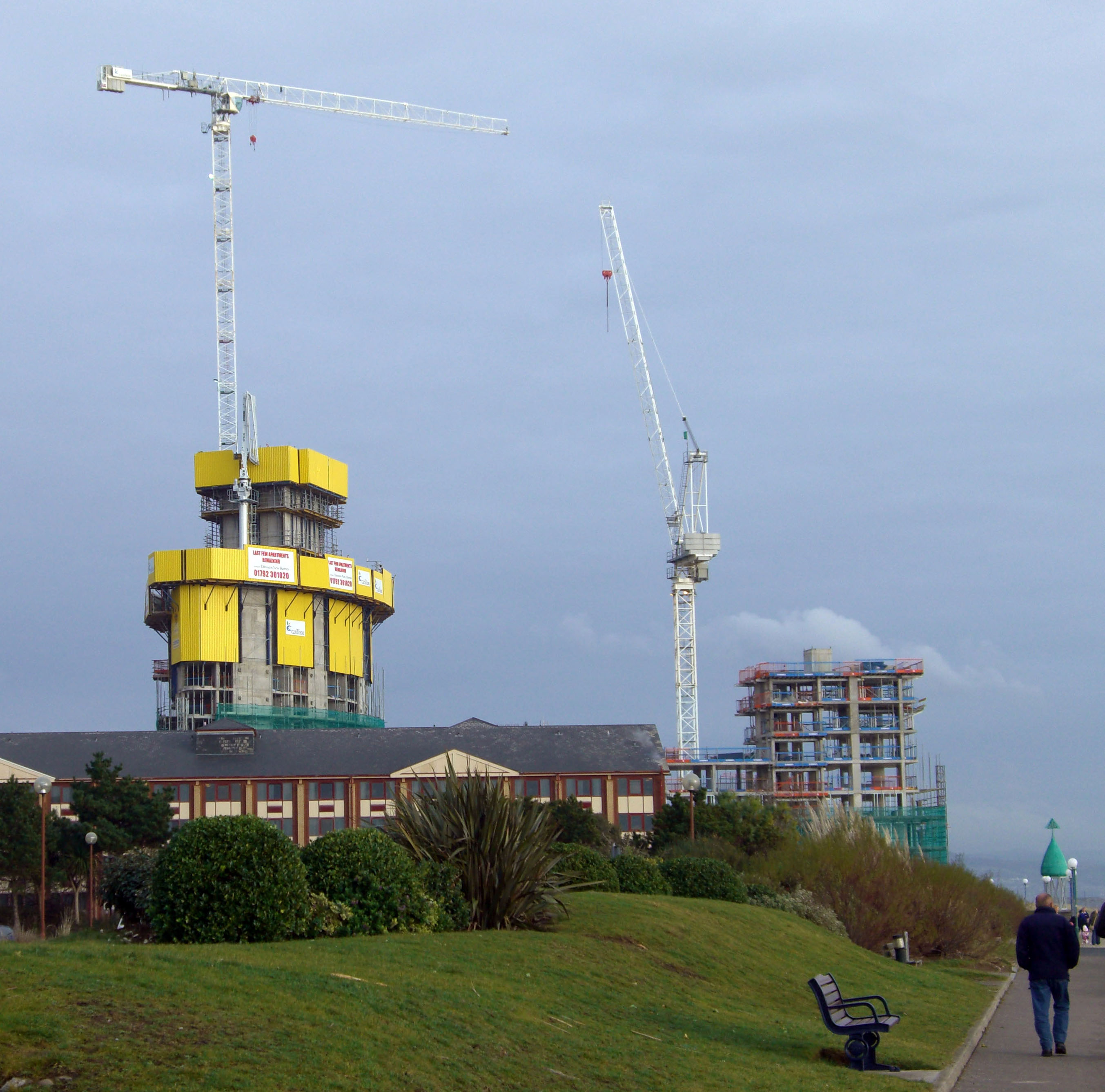
Tower under construction, January 2008

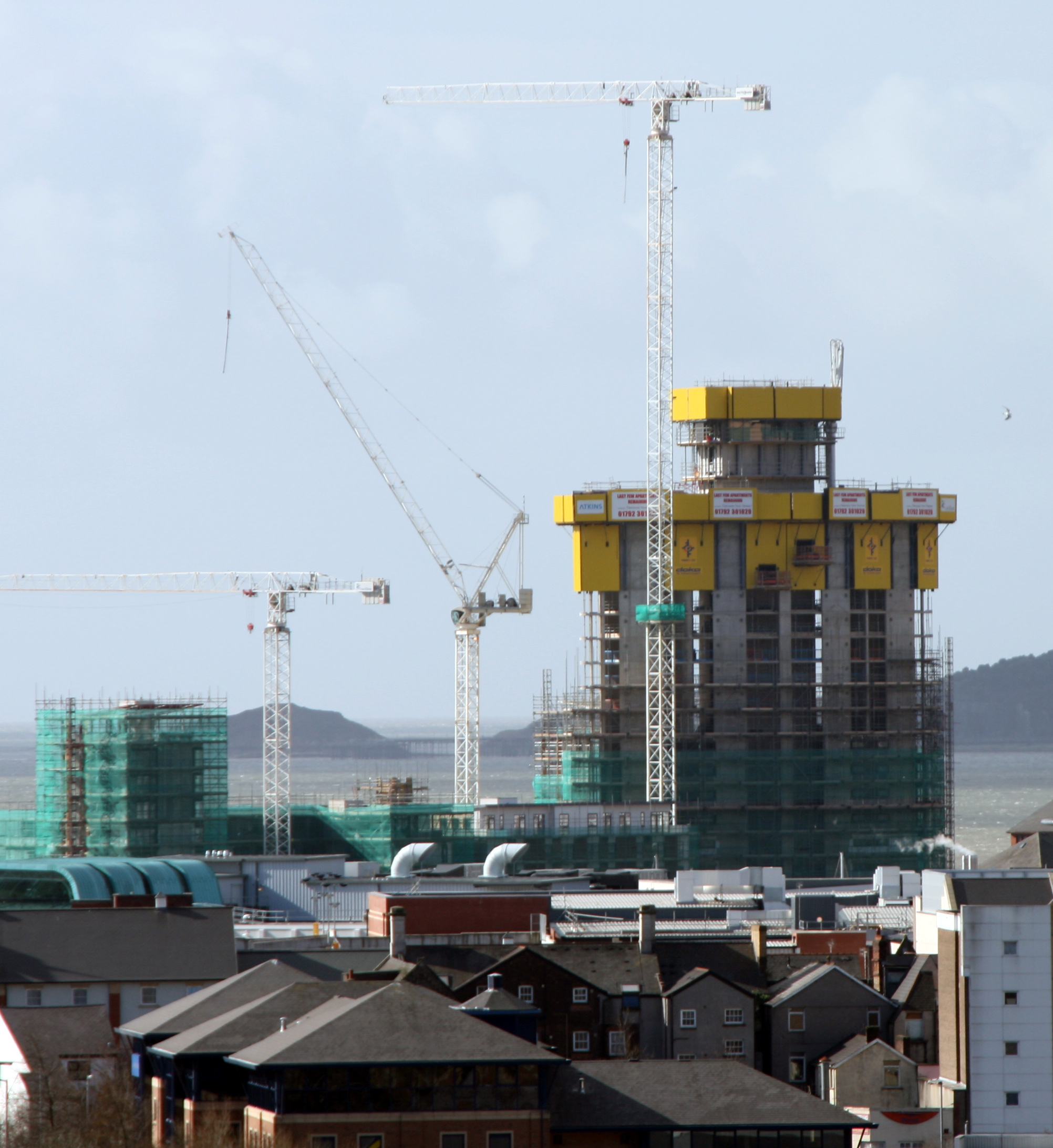
Tower under construction, March 2008

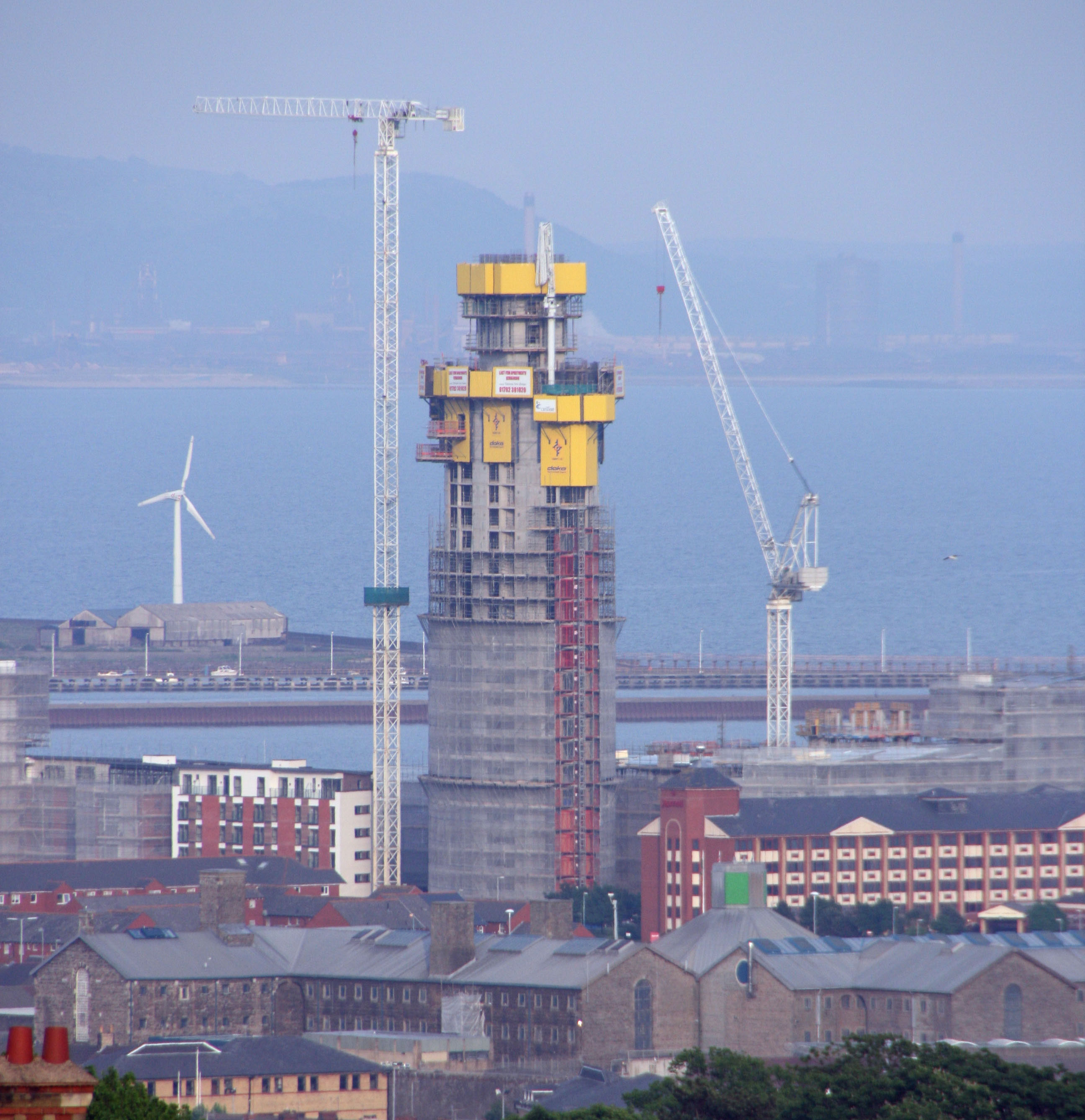
Tower under construction, May 2008

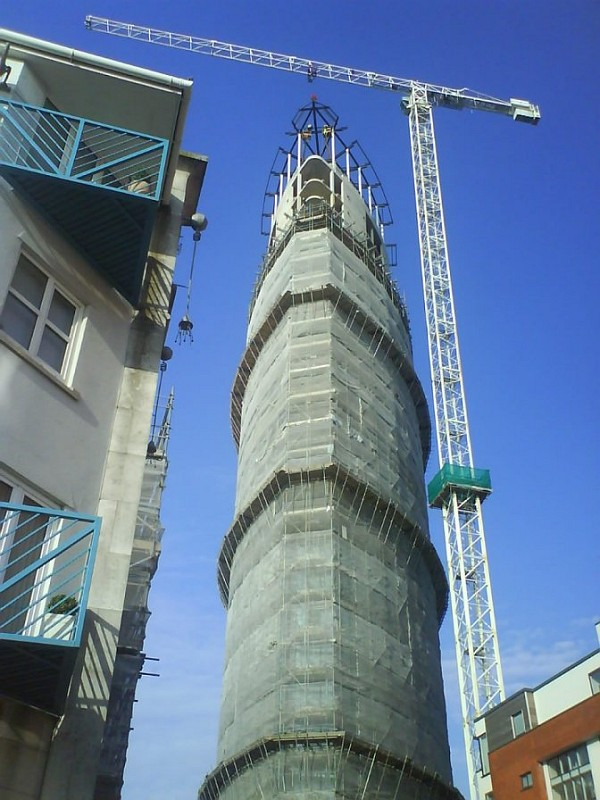
Tower topping-out, September 2008

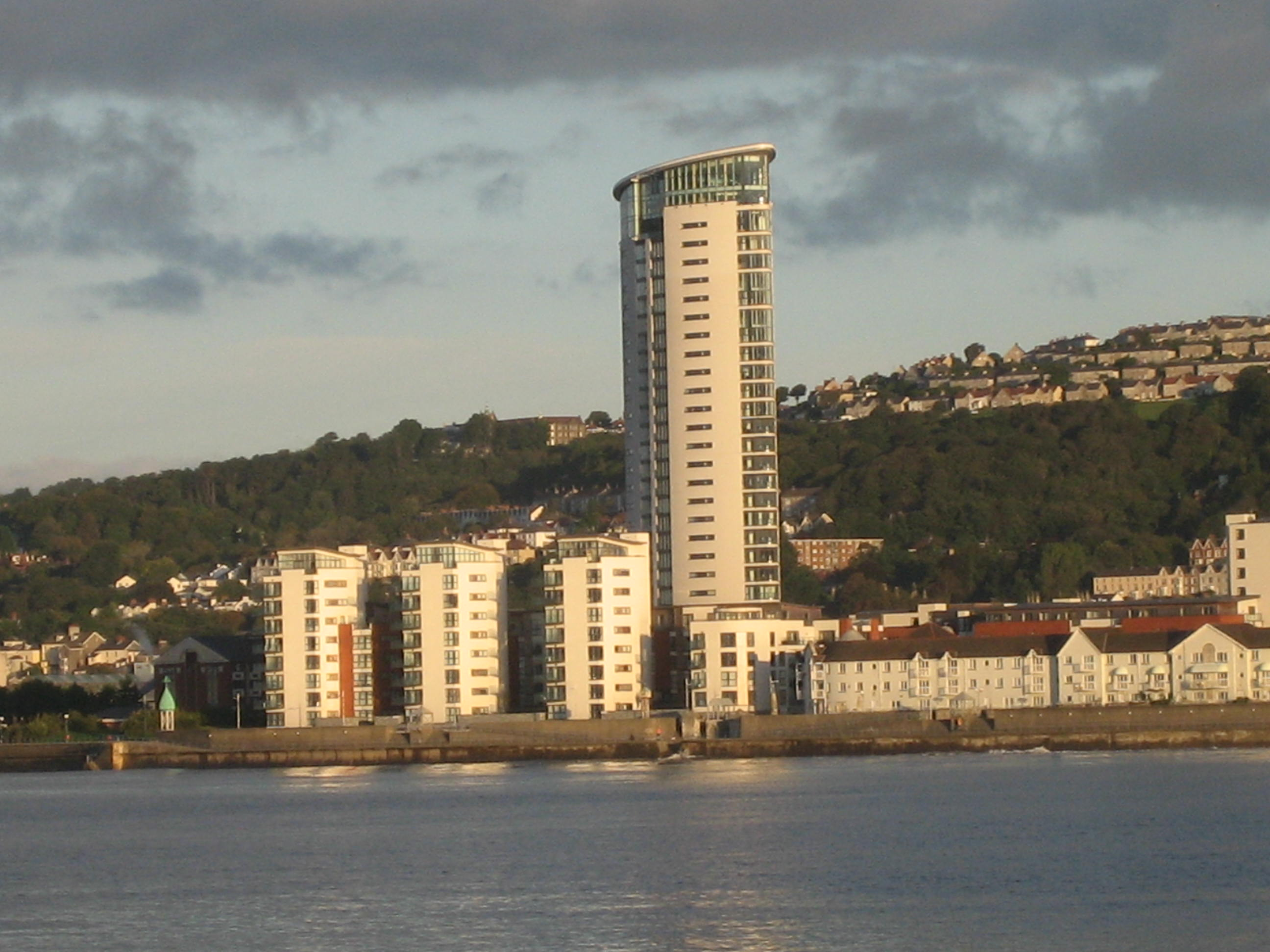
Tower from the breakwater during high tide, September 2010
