= BT Tower (Swansea) =

Office building in Wales

- Tŵr BT
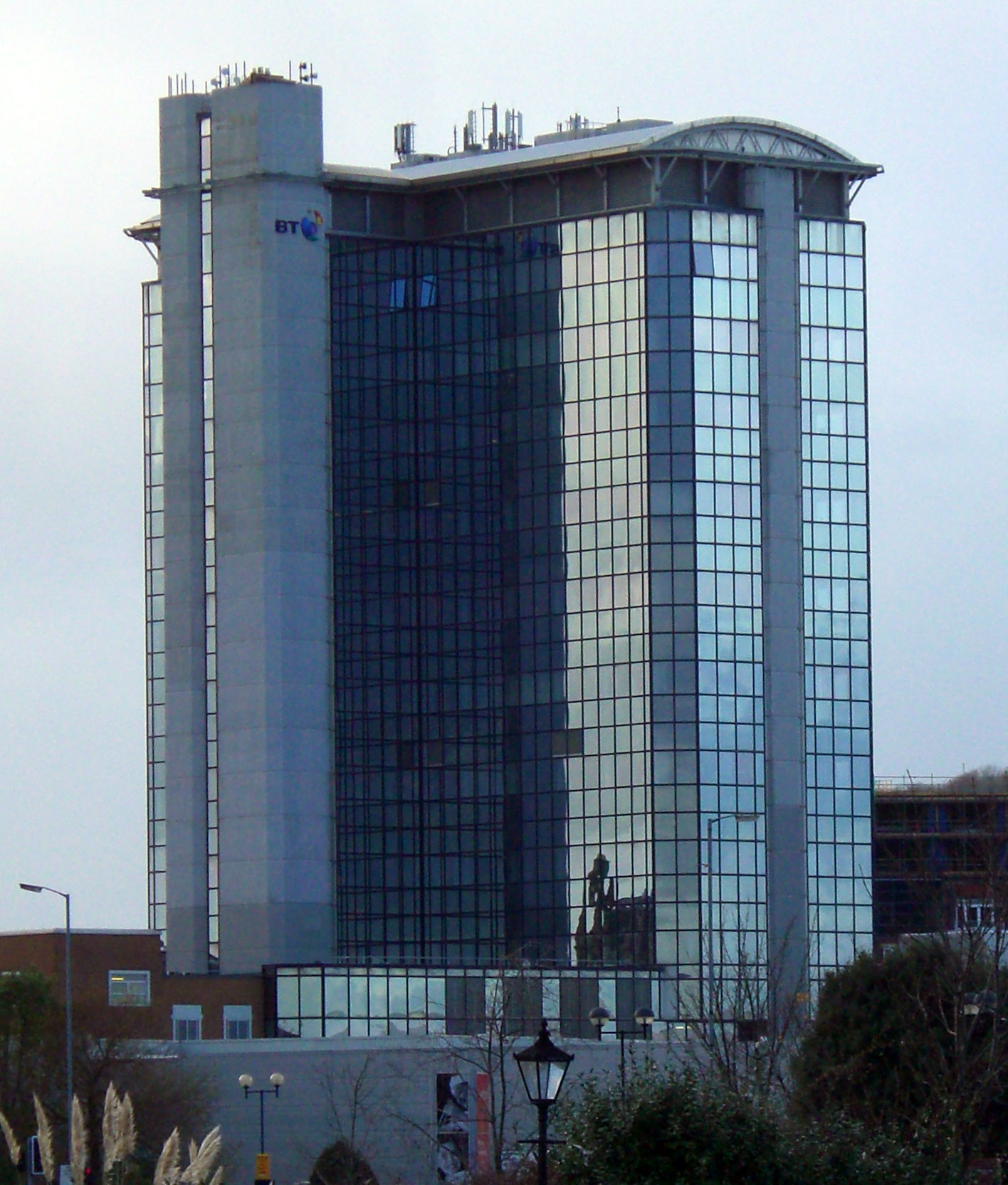
- Interactive map of the BT Tower area

General information
- Location: Swansea, Wales, United Kingdom, Strand, Swansea SA1 2AG
- Coordinates: 51°37′14.00″N 3°56′25.00″W
- Owner: BT Group

Height
- Height: 63 metres (207 ft)

The BT Tower (Welsh: Tŵr BT) is located near Swansea Castle and is the second tallest building in Swansea after The Tower, Meridian Quay. It has 13 floors and is 63 metres (207 ft) high. Completed in 1970 by the General Post Office, the BT Group uses it as an office building.
