= Swansea Central police station =

Police station

Coordinates: 51.622°N 3.946°W

Swansea Central police station is a 21st-century-designed building, located on the former Swansea Fire Station site in Alexandra Road, near Swansea Magistrates Court, Swansea. The police station is the area headquarters for the Western Division of South Wales Police.

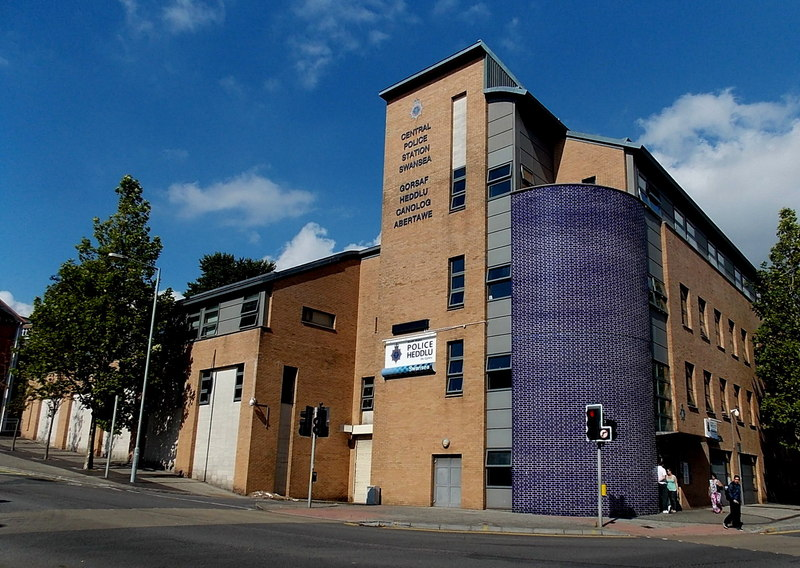
Central police station in Swansea

== Old Swansea Central Police station ==
The former city-centre police station in Swansea is a Grade II listed building, also situated in Alexandra Road. In 2003 it was acquired by the housing association, Grŵp Gwalia Cyf, and was redeveloped into Llys Glas. It provides student accommodation for Swansea Metropolitan University, an art gallery and a conference studio.

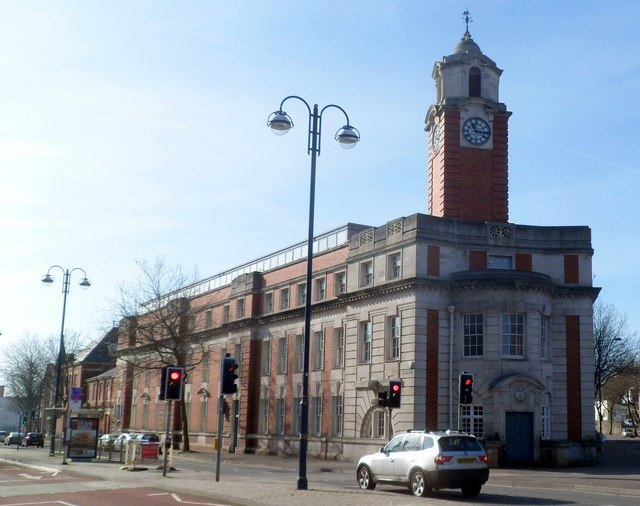
Former Swansea police station
