= Mynydd y Gwair =

Coordinates: 51.76794°N 3.93635°W

Mynydd y Gwair (Penlle’r Castell)

Highest point
- Elevation: 373 m (1,224 ft)
- Listing: Marilyn

Geography
- Location: Swansea, Wales, United Kingdom
- OS grid: SN6648109470

Mynydd y Gwair (Penlle’r Castell) (English: The Hay Mountain) is a mountain in Swansea, Wales. Mynydd y Gwair is 373 m (1,224 ft) high.

== Wind farm development ==
On 2 September 2008 Npower renewables submitted a planning application for the development of a wind farm on Mynydd Y Gwair. The proposed development was for 19 wind turbines over a site of 473 hectares, each with a maximum height of 127m and an output of 2.5MW. The total average output of the development is estimated to be 38-57MW, enough to supply 28,000 homes equivalent to 29% of the homes in the Swansea unitary authority area.

The site is at the western end of the Pontardawe Strategic Search Areas (SSAs), one of seven SSAs in Wales identified by the Welsh Assembly Government in 2005 as recommended sites for large scale wind generation. The SSA locations were identified based primarily on technical and environmental grounds following investigations by Arup. WAG set a target of 100MW of wind generating capacity to be installed in the Pontardawe SSA by 2010, this development would therefore provide approximately half the target capacity in the area.

The proposed development attracted opposition including a group called 'Save Our Common Mountain Environment' (SOCME). A protest walk in August 2004 attracted significant support including that of prominent environmentalist Professor David Bellamy.
