= Swansea Castle =

Castle in Swansea, Wales

- Swansea, Wales
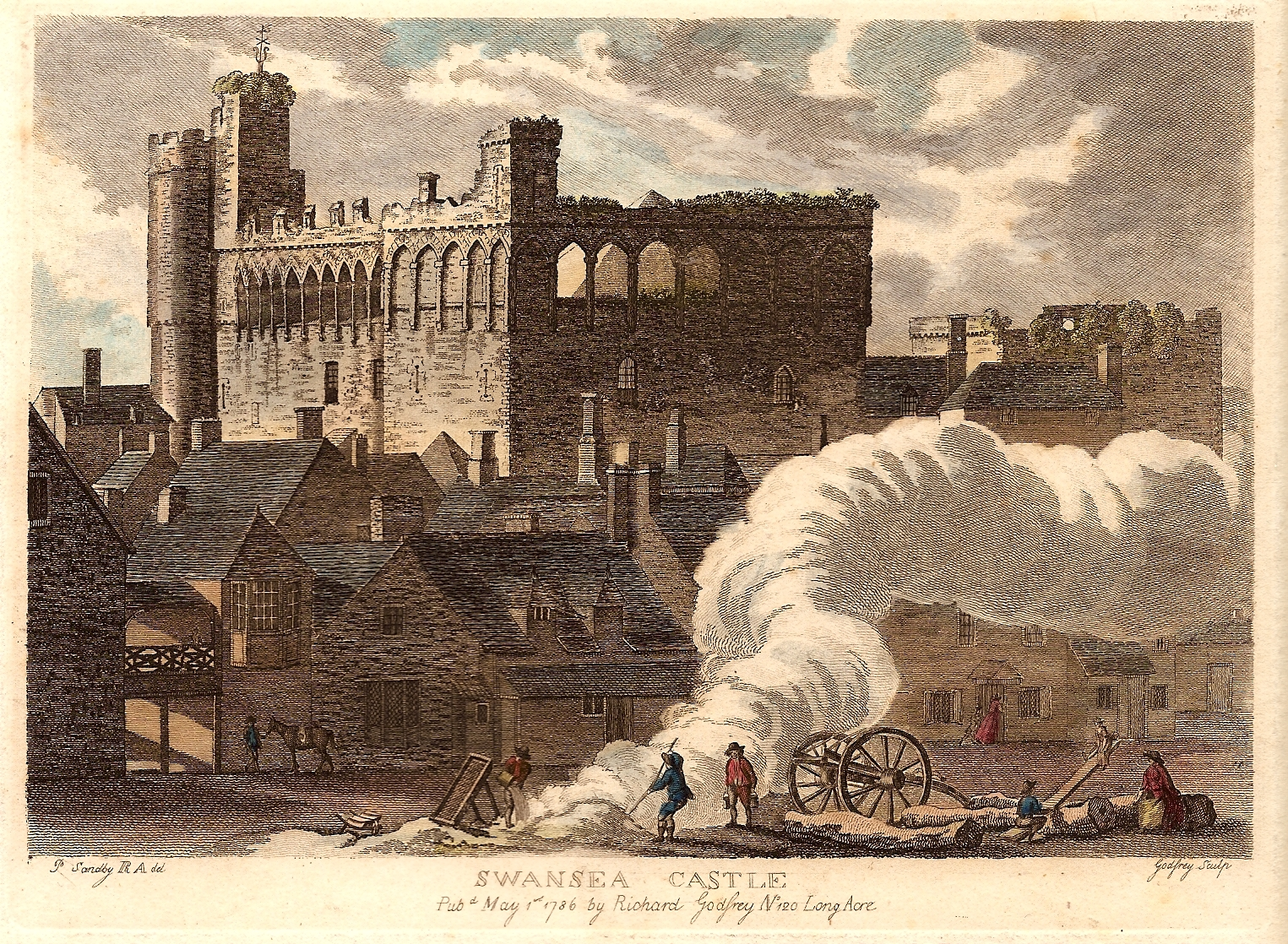
- Swansea Castle in 1786

Site information
- Type: Castle
- Condition: Ruins

Location
- Shown within Wales
- Coordinates: 51.6203°N 3.9412°W

Site history
- Built: 1107
- Battles/wars: 1116 – Partially destroyed by the Welsh 1192 – Survived a 10-week siege

Listed Building
- Type: Grade I listed
- Designated: 1952

Swansea Castle (Welsh: Castell Abertawe) is located in the city centre of Swansea, Wales, UK. It was founded by Henry de Beaumont in 1107 as the caput of the lordship of Gower. The castle is now ruined and only two blocks remain, though the site has been improved in the 2010s for use as a public space.

== Location ==
Swansea Castle is located on the east side of the city centre, facing Castle Square (the River Tawe used to flow a short distance east on what is now the Strand). Originally covering 4.6 acres (1.9 ha), the surviving remains of the square castle include residential blocks, together with a section of parapet wall forming an L-shape to the southeast. There are five tunnel-vaulted basement rooms.

== History ==
=== The first castles ===
Henry de Beaumont was granted the Lordship of Gower in 1106 and he began to solidify the control of the Normans in the area. A timber castle existed in Swansea in 1116, when it was recorded as being attacked by Welsh forces who destroyed the outer defences.

The original castle seems to have been a sub-rectangular/oval enclosure overlooking the River Tawe on the east, surrounded on the north, west and south sides by a larger sub-rectangular outer bailey. The inner bailey probably contained a motte but the other view is that it was a ring work. The motte (or ring work) was 52 metres (171 ft) in diameter (only second in size to Cardiff Castle) and survived to the early 20th century.

The castle was besieged and captured in 1192 by Rhys ap Gruffydd, Prince of Deheubarth. Despite 10 weeks of starvation the castle was saved.

After various other unsuccessful attacks the castle fell in 1217 but was restored to the English in 1220 as part of the settlement between Llywelyn ap Iorwerth and Henry III of England.

The castle was rebuilt in stone, probably between 1221 and 1284 (described now as the "New Castle"), firstly the inner castle with at least one tower, finally the large outer bailey.

The only visible remains today, two sides of the rectangular South East corner of the "new castle"'s outer bailey, were built in the late 13th or early 14th century. The south face (which ends in a tall garderobe tower) is capped with an elegant series of arcades at the wall-head, which are similar to structures at the Bishop of Saint David's palaces at Lamphey and St David's.

=== 14th to 19th centuries ===
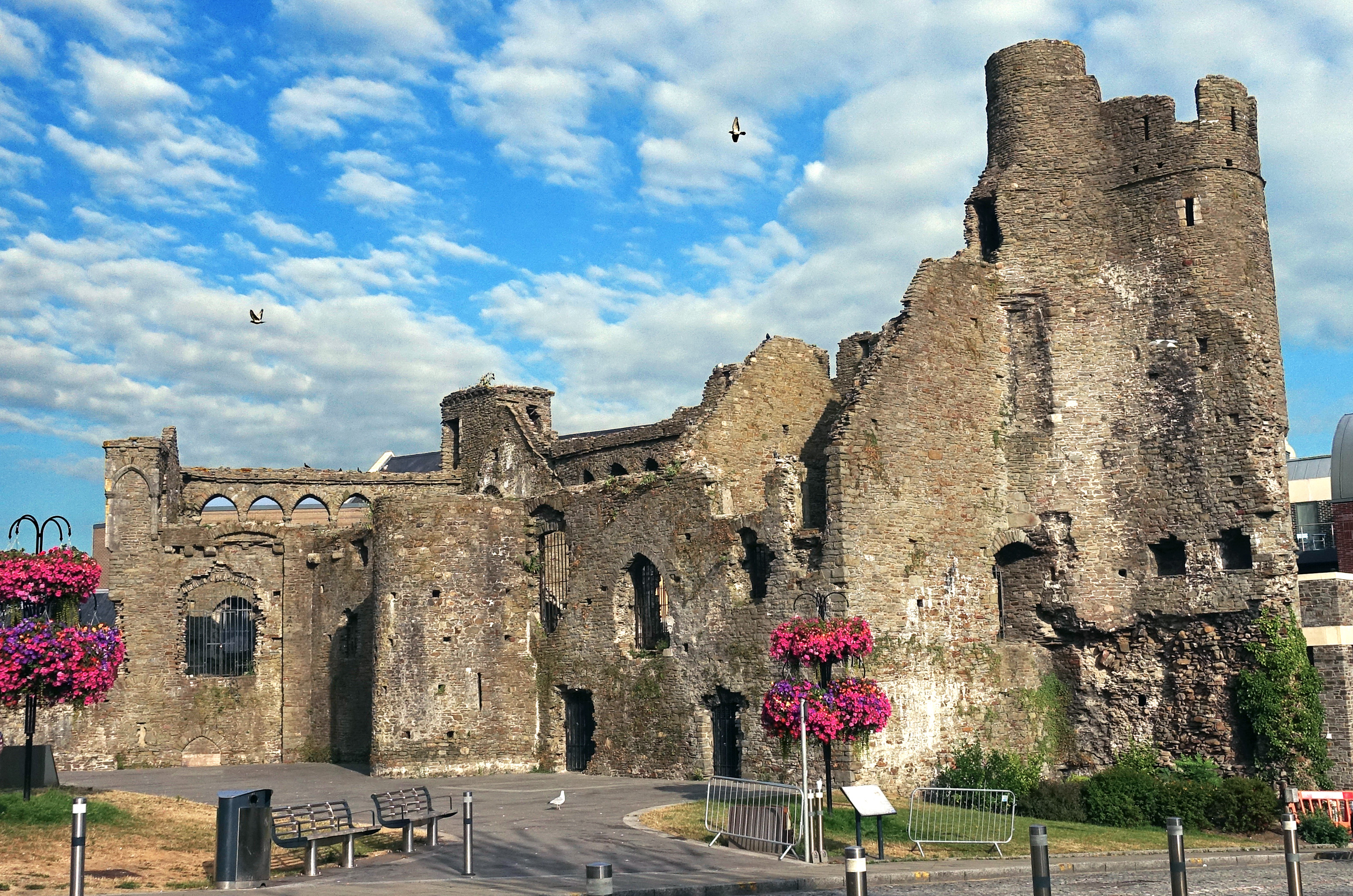
Swansea Castle 2018

By the 14th century the castle was losing its military importance. Alina de Mowbray ruled the Gower until 1331 when her son John de Mowbray took over as Lord of Gower. He was probably responsible for adding the arcaded parapet walk to the castle.

Despite the Welsh rebellion led by Owain Glyndŵr, which saw a number of English castles attacked in the early years of the 1400s, it is not known whether Swansea fell to these forces. Swansea Castle's account books only record that two men were sent north to gather intelligence on Glyndŵr's activities.

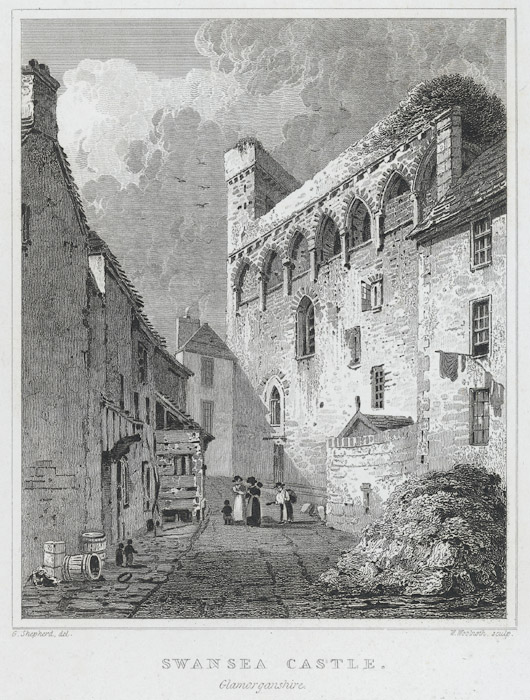
Swansea Castle, 1824 print

The castle owners were subsequently absentee landlords. By 1650 the castle was described as "a decayed Buildinge". By the 1670s the square tower was being used as a bottle factory and, in 1700, a town hall was built in the castle courtyard. By the mid 1700s the Great Hall had become Swansea's workhouse. The town hall was replaced by a post office in the 1800s and, by 1850, a military Drill Room had replaced the workhouse. The River Tawe, which had flowed near to the castle, was straightened and diverted during the 1840s.

== 20th and 21st centuries ==
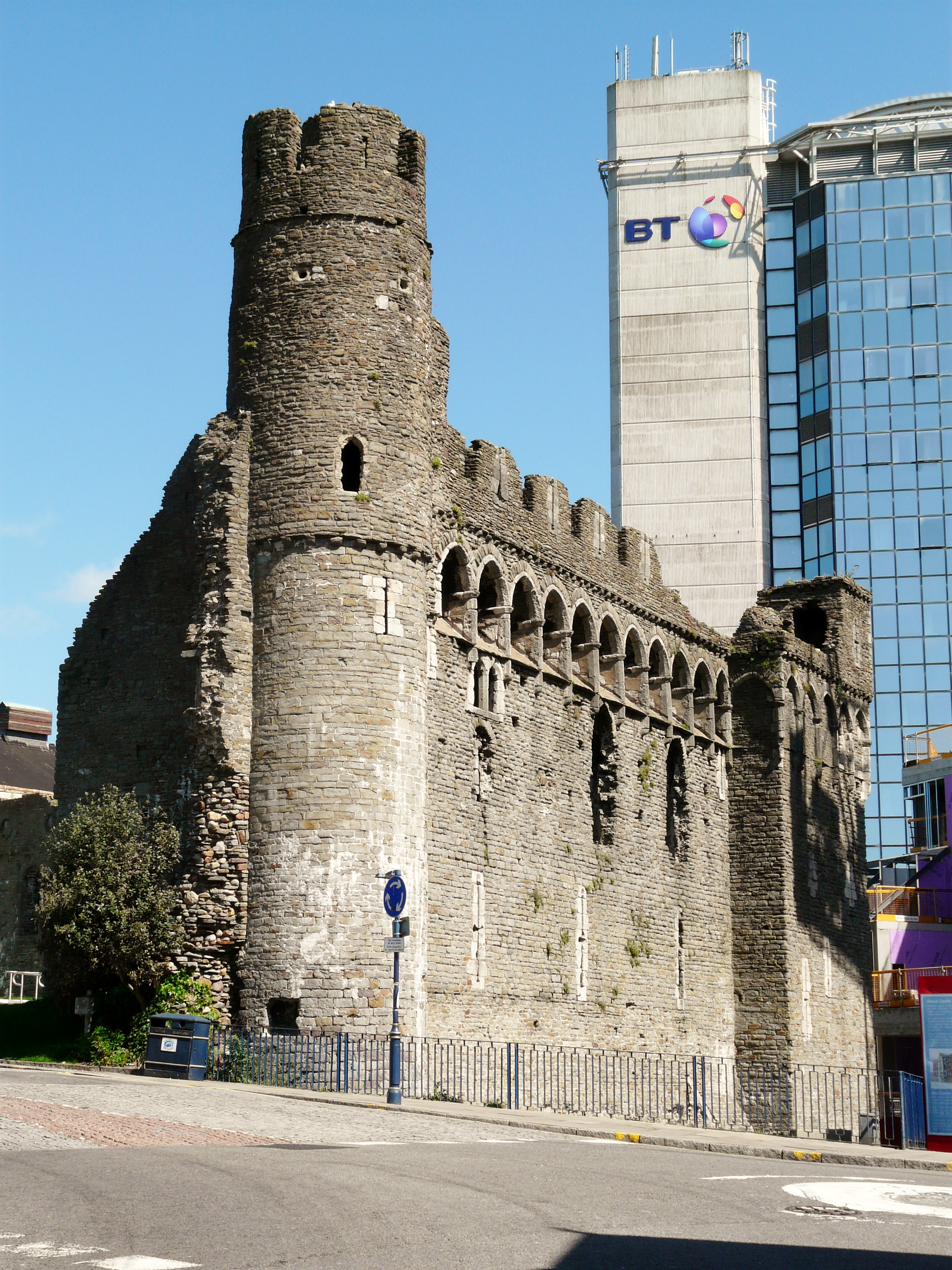
The castle in its modern setting

Part of the interior of the castle, in particular the large motte, was demolished 1909–1913 for the construction of a newspaper office. In the very early 1930s, poet Dylan Thomas worked for the South Wales Daily Post at the castle site. The newspaper offices were removed in 1976 and the remains of the castle were later consolidated and opened up to view from the street.

As a scheduled monument, it was given a Grade I heritage listing in 1952.

The castle was fenced off and only opened to the public on rare occasions, most recently for public tours in 2012 to coincide with St Davids Day. In the early 2010s a project was launched, funded by the European Regional Development Fund and Welsh Government, to open up the castle to the public on a more permanent basis with a stone paved courtyard and information panels. Demountable stairs were planned, to access the upper floors. The intention was to have public tours, events such as markets and for the castle to feature as part of a Swansea castle trail.

== Sources ==
- B Morris, Swansea Castle; RCAHMW, Glamorgan, Vol III, part (1b), The Later Castles (2000).
- RCAHMW An Inventory of the Ancient Monuments in Glamorgan: Volume III: Part 1a Medieval Secular Monuments – The Early Castles from the Norman Conquest to 1217 (1991). ISBN 0-11-300035-9
