= Swansea History Journal =

- Discipline: Welsh history and geography
- Language: English
- Edited by: Gerald Gabb

Publication details
- Former name: Minerva
- History: 1993–present
- Frequency: Annual

Standard abbreviations
- ISO 4: Swans. Hist. J.

Indexing
- ISSN: 0969-3246

Links
- Journal homepage; Open Access archive 1993-2006

The Swansea History Journal – Minerva is a journal started in 1993 containing articles on historical and artistic topics related to the Swansea area of Wales.

It is published by The Royal Institution of South Wales, founded in 1835 as Swansea Philosophical and Literary Society. Its aims are to advance the study of natural history, local history, the arts and literature. Its principal activities have been the foundation and management of Swansea Museum, and holding lectures and other events. It now acts as the Friends of Swansea Museum.

The journal was launched as Minerva in 1993 as an English language popular journal containing topics related to the Swansea area. From 1995 it was retitled into Minerva – Swansea's Local History Journal. In 1999 it changed again; this time into Minerva – The Journal of Swansea History. And in 2007/08 it became the Swansea History Journal – Minerva.

The first fourteen volumes of the journal (from 1993 to 2006) have been digitized by the Welsh Journals Online project at the National Library of Wales.
