= Royal Institution of South Wales =

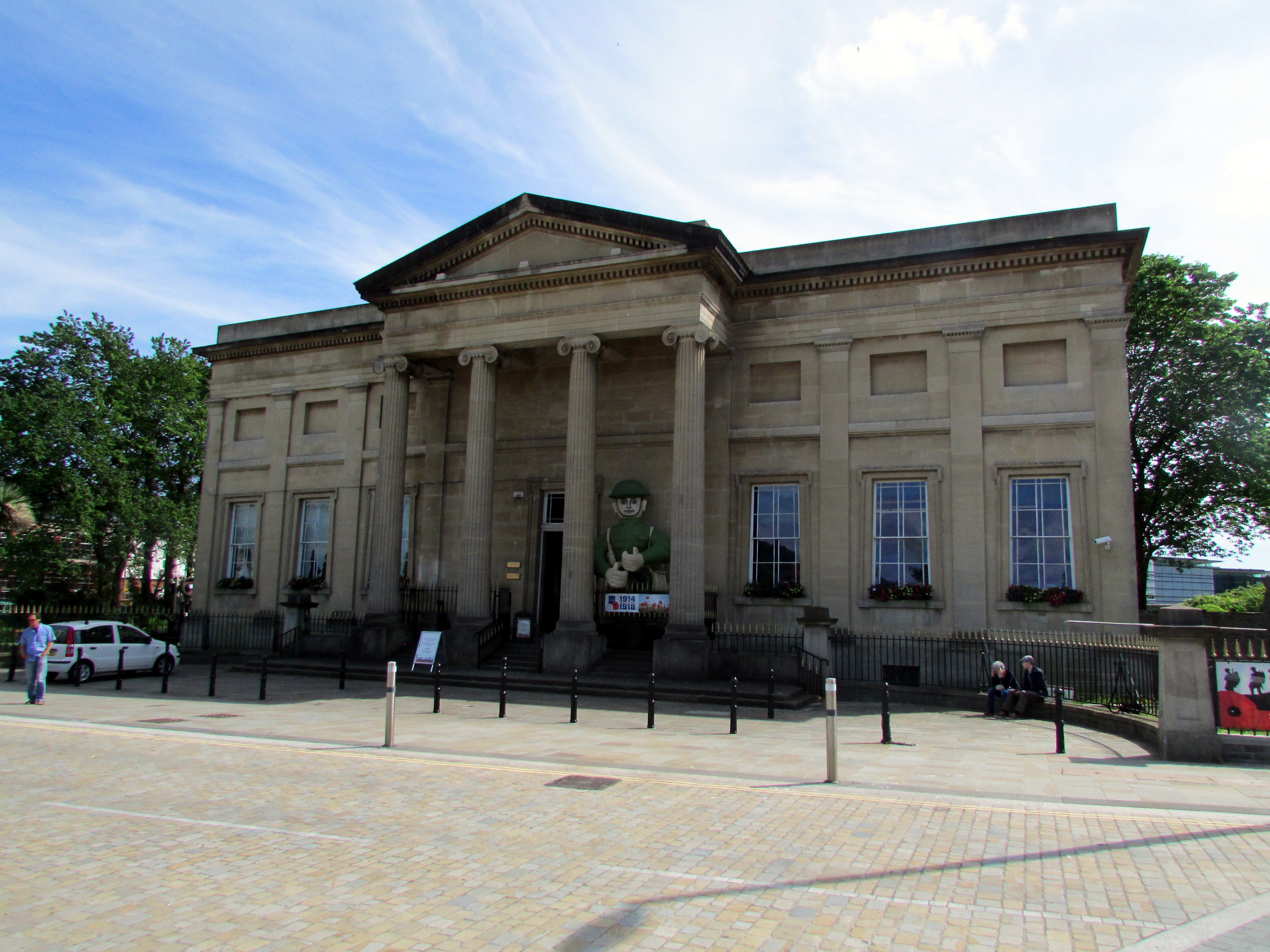
- The former Royal Institution of South Wales building on Burrows Place, Swansea, c. 1835.
- Established: 1835
- Location: Swansea
- Founder: George Grant Francis
- Website: www.risw.org

The Royal Institution of South Wales is a Welsh learned society founded by George Grant Francis in Swansea in 1835.

Prior to its establishment, the Royal Institution was known as the Swansea Philosophical and Literary Society, which maintained the following objectives:

The Cultivation and Advancement of the various Branches of Natural History, as well as the Local History of the Town and Neighbourhood, the Extension and Encouragement of Literature and the Fine Arts, and the General Diffusion of Knowledge.

In 1838, the Society received its Royal charter as the Royal Institution.

It is the oldest cultural organisation of its kind in Wales and since its establishment, has worked to share knowledge across multiple disciplines including history, science, art, culture and technology.

In 1841, the Royal Institution of South Wales founded and commissioned Swansea Museum, the oldest standing museum in Wales. The building was established to store and exhibit the Royal Institution’s range of collections as well as to create space for learning facilities and the provision of research.

Research conducted by the Royal Institution of South Wales is published in an array of academic journals and newsletters, two of which were founded by the Institution itself. These include the Annual Report of the Swansea Literary and Scientific Society, a magazine first published in 1850, and Minerva, a journal first published in 2006 which was later retitled as the Swansea History Journal.

The Royal Institution of South Wales holds a variety of events, activities, and functions within the spheres of history, science, technology, arts, culture and education.

== History ==
The Royal Institution of South Wales, prior to its royal patronage, was originally known as the Swansea Philosophical and Literary Society. In 1835, George Grant Francis founded the society and within one week of creating its prospectus, had gained over 50 annual subscribers. Following this, two meetings were held on Castle Bailey Street in the Town Hall, during which the Society was established by Francis and several other founders. One of these meetings was chaired by the Vicar of Swansea, Reverend W. Hewson.

Within a year of establishing the Society, its founders applied for royal patronage. At the request of the Institution’s assembly, John Henry Vivian, Member of Parliament for Swansea (1832-1855), contacted Lord John Russell, petitioning patronage from Queen Victoria. In their letter of application, it stated that due to its location in a central mining and manufacturing region, the Institution presents opportunities for scientific study including Geology and Mineralogy.

In 1838, the royal patronage was approved, and Queen Victoria agreed to be the Institution’s patroness. Following this consent, the Swansea Philosophical and Literary Society was renamed as the Royal Institution of South Wales. During World War II the Institution suffered several explosions and as a result, experienced extensive damage to its roofs and windows. During this time, the exhibits were evacuated, and the building was later closed to repair and refurbish the destruction caused by the war. The Institution was established to support the growth of Swansea’s scientific community, and served to distinguish South Wales as an industrial, cultural, and commercial center. The RISW offered its members the opportunity to study and become involved in a wide range of fields, with natural history and botany being the most popular amongst its upper-class subscribers.

=== Founders ===
Several significant figures were involved in the establishment of the Royal Institution of South Wales. The founders included:

- George Grant Francis (1814-1882) who formed the original prospectus for the Swansea Philosophical and Literary Society, before it became known as the Royal Institution of South Wales.
- John Henry Vivian (1785-1855) who was significant in the procurement of the Institution’s Royal title.
- Lewis Weston Dillwyn (1778-1855), former President of the Royal Institution, 1835–1856.
- Sir William Robert Grove (1811–1896), whose main interest was in scientific studies.
- Sir William Edmond Logan (1798-1875), a student of geology.
- Sir Henry De la Beche (1796-1855) who was also devoted to geology and spent his adult life studying and teaching it.
- John Gwyn Jeffreys (1809-1885), who practiced conchology.
- Christopher Rice Mansel Talbot (1803-1890), former president of the Royal Institution, 1856–1857.

=== Women in the early institution ===
Whilst most of the Institution’s early subscribers were male, women also formed a small division of the membership. Female members were often listed alongside their male counterparts; however, the Institution introduced an inclusive policy that meant that women were invited to attend lectures and use the facilities, including the library and museum. This policy reflected national attitudes at the time, which sought to advance female participation in the scientific community. Mrs Benson, daughter of Reverend John Collins, was subscribed to the Royal Institution of South Wales alongside her father, husband, and brother. The Institution ruled that male subscribers may introduce women from their own family, allowing them to engage in activities and programmes held by the institution. The use of the library, museum and attendance at lectures were not limited to women who subscribed or were related to male subscribers.

== Current institution ==
Today, the Royal Institute of South Wales works across several roles. Its primary objective is to share knowledge across the fields of history, contemporary affairs, science, culture, arts and technology. It maintains a strong focus on Swansea and is committed to preserving and communicating its community history. The RISW works closely with Swansea Museum, acting as an ambassador and providing financial support. The Royal Institute has a continuous intake of new members and is open to all people who are interested in promoting education and knowledge. In January 2015, Lyndon Morris stepped down from his role as President of the RISW. In the same month, the Institute appointed a new President, Jenny Sabine. Sabine has experience on the Royal Institute’s Council as well as fifteen years working for the Swansea Museum Service. Within the same year, the following council members retired from their positions: Bernice Cardy, Michael Isaac, Derek Harper, and Vernon Williams. This transition brought about a series of new elections, during which Mari Evans, Richard Porch, Howard Morgan and John Tucker gained positions at RISW.

=== Membership ===
The RISW has a constant intake of new members and is open to everyone in the community. Benefits of a membership with the Royal Institute include:

- A printed copy of the Institute’s program
- Three annual newsletters
- A discount on purchases from Swansea Museum
- A discount for the Swansea History Journal
- Access to events and activities run by the Institute
- Involvement in social events such as the annual book fair

Each year the Institute organises a programme for its members which include varied topics of interest. Lectures and events are run by RISW and cover historical, current, and future affairs within the local Swansea community and the broader global context. Speakers include experts from the community and well-known figures. The RISW also opens the Swansea History Journal to its members, who are able to contribute and publish their own work.

== Swansea Museum ==
Swansea Museum was founded by the Royal Institution and having opened in 1841, is the longest standing museum in Wales. A well as the museum itself, located on Oystermouth Road, it functions across several sites, including the Tramway Centre in Dylan Thomas Square, the museum’s library, and the Pontoon in the Marina. From 1975 to 1985, the Royal Institution partnered with Swansea University to help maintain and support the museum. It was owned and directed by the Institution until 1990, when its ownership was transferred to the City and County of Swansea. Swansea Museum and the Royal Institution of South Wales worked collaboratively to increase membership numbers. By 1900, the Institution had grown to 446 members, having had over 12,000 people visit the museum in 1884. The Royal Institution assisted the museum in its acquisition of several items. Greek and Roman artefacts, as well as terracottas, were collected by John Henry Vivian, one of the founding members of RISW.

=== RISW partnership ===
Since its transfer of ownership to the City and County of Swansea in 1990, the RISW is involved with Swansea Museum in several ways. The Royal Institute acts as an ambassador for the Museum, helping to promote its profile within local and global spheres. In 2014, the RISW held the annual conference of the British Association of Friends of Museums across Britain to introduce representatives to the historical and cultural scene in Swansea. The RISW also holds an annual programme of lectures within Swansea Museum that are open to the public.

The Royal Institute makes consistent financial contributions to the Museum, supporting the cost of conservation projects, purchasing items for its collections, and raising funds for major developments. A key project included funding for a specialist restoration of books in the Museum Library. RISW also purchases items that are displayed as part of the Museum’s collections. These include paintings by local artists and pottery pieces from neighbouring Welsh potteries. The RISW partners with Swansea Museum to provide practical assistant and expert knowledge. Members of the Institute can become involved in the Museum’s volunteer scheme which records and maintains collections, assists with visitors, programmes and events. Members who have specialist skills help the staff at Swansea Museum to respond to visitor queries, identify objects within collections and work on varied projects.

== Programmes and activities ==
The Royal Institution of South Wales was the first organisation in Wales to promote science programmes that were sponsored by the Department of Science and Art. The Science Division afforded the Institution teachers in multiple departments of science, including geometry, geology, physics, chemistry, natural history, and mineralogy. A major part of the Royal Institution of South Wales is dedicated to education. Since its establishment in 1835, the Institution has been dedicated to delivering lectures across numerous disciplines, from the history and culture of Swansea to different branches of science.

These lecture programmes reflected the prominence of industry in Swansea; its focus on geology and mineralogy was largely due to its location within a mining region with a growing industrial presence. The Institution’s success has been largely attributed to its ability to serve a broad scientific community, teaching lectures across a variety of disciplines to cater to all its members.

In conjunction to its lecture programmes, the Royal Institute of South Wales holds annual events ranging from exhibition and educational activities to social evenings and university partnerships. Members can find expression through the Institution’s literary and debating society, scientific society, art society and photography society. From 2020 to early 2022, the RISW held its events and activities via Zoom to maintain the safety of its staff and members during the COVID-19 pandemic. Face-to-face meetings were reintroduced on 28 April 2022.

== Publications ==
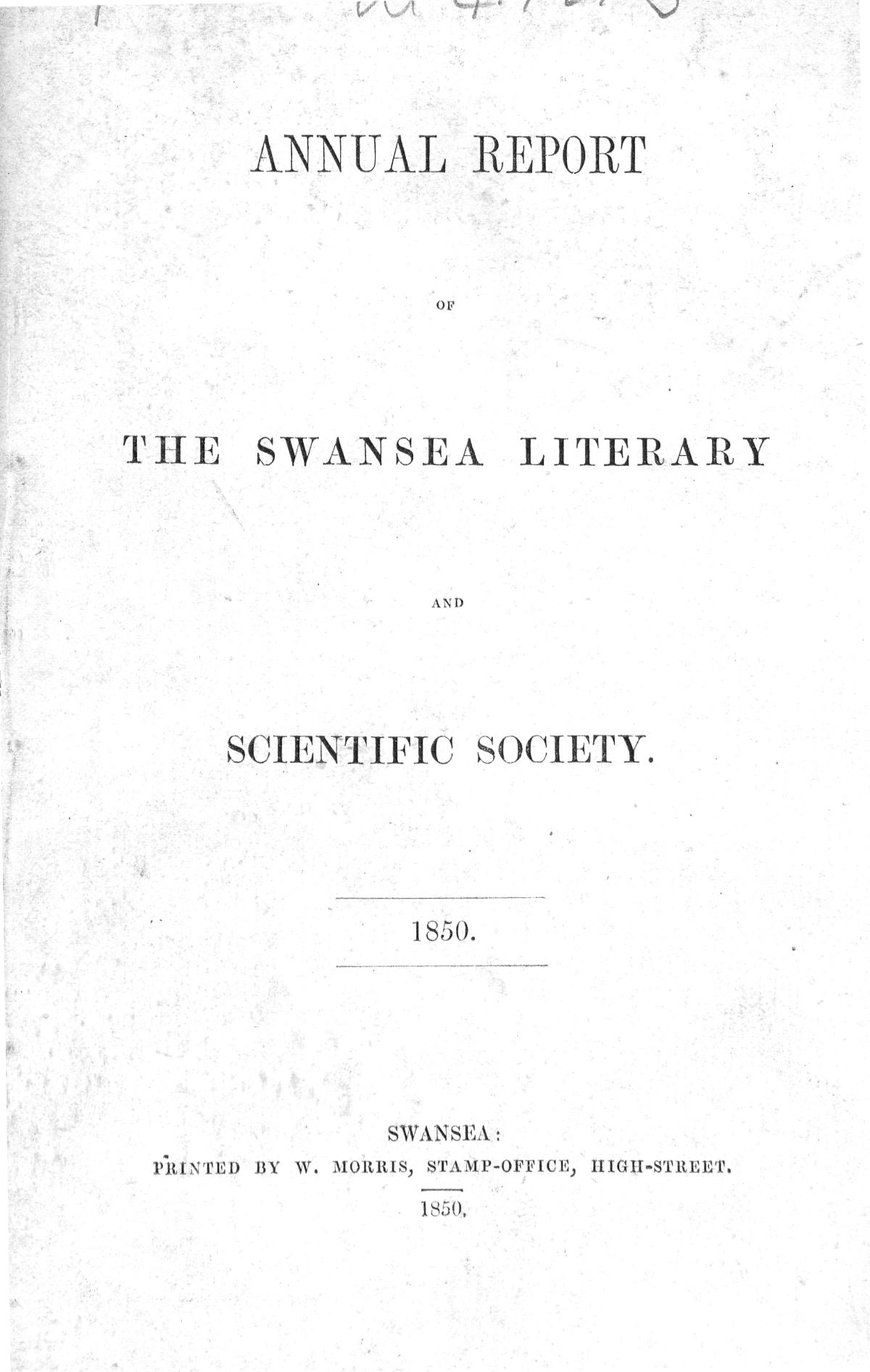
Annual Report of the Swansea Literary and Scientific Society (Welsh Journal)

The Royal Institution of South Wales publishes work in a wide range of publications, including:

- The Annual Report of the Swansea Literary and Scientific Society: an annual magazine first published by 'Swansea Literary and Scientific Society' in 1850. In addition to reports on the society's activities it contained articles on scientific subjects, history, and antiquarianism.
- Minerva: a history journal launched by the Royal Institute in 1993, later renamed to Swansea History Journal in 2006 (thus avoiding confusion with an arts magazine called Minerva). This journal offers insight into Swansea’s historical past and allows people within the community to be published. In August 2020, the RISW launched Volume 28 of the Swansea History Journal digitally, making it the first volume to be fully accessible online.
- History of Swansea and the Lordship of Gower by W.H. Jones.
- The Remarkable James Livingstone by David Farmer and Brian Lile.
- Keeping Welsh Heritage Alive: History, Heritage & Regeneration in Swansea by Huw Bowen, Graham Humphrys and Michael Williams.
