= Swansea Minster =

- Minster Church of St. Mary Swansea with Holy Trinity
- Mystwyr Abertawe (Welsh)
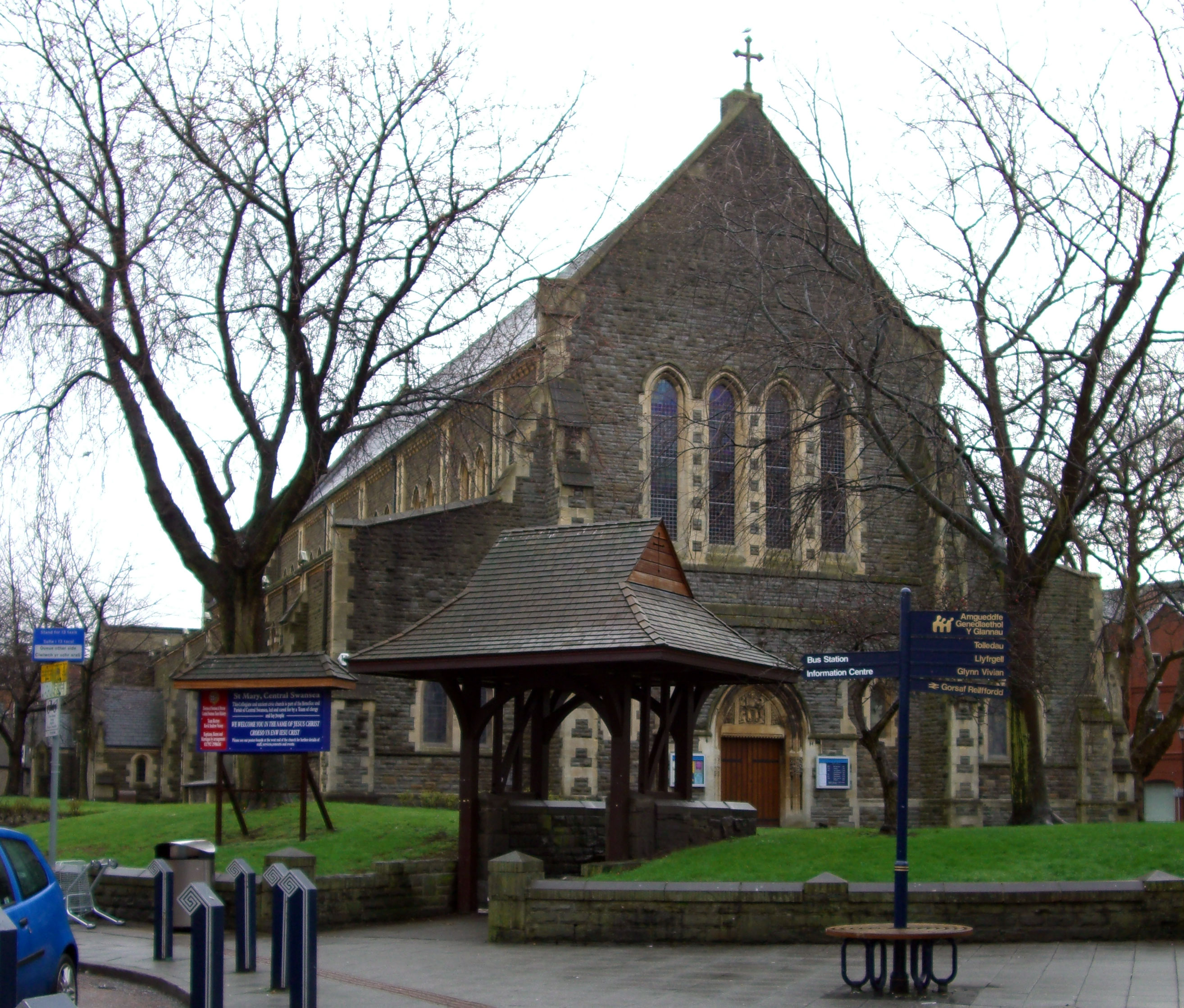

- Location in Swansea
- 51.619°N 3.943°W
- Location: Swansea
- Country: Wales
- Denomination: Church in Wales
- Previous denomination: Roman Catholic
- Website: https://www.swanseaminster.org.uk/

History
- Former name: St Mary's Church
- Status: Minster church
- Founded: early 13th century
- Founder(s): Henry de Gower, Bishop of Saint David's
- Consecrated: 1959

Architecture
- Functional status: Active
- Heritage designation: Grade II*
- Designated: 1896,1950
- Architect(s): Arthur Blomfield, Dean Allan Smith
- Architectural type: Church

Administration
- Province: Wales
- Diocese: Swansea and Brecon
- Archdeaconry: Gower
- Deanery: Afon Tawe (Swansea)
- Parish: Central Swansea

Clergy
- Archbishop: Most Revd Cherry Vann
- Bishop: Right Revd John Lomas
- Rector: The Revd Canon Justin Davies

Swansea Minster (Welsh: Mystwyr Abertawe), or formally the Minster Church of St. Mary Swansea with Holy Trinity, and formerly St Mary's Church, is an Anglican Minster church in the centre of Swansea, Wales. It is considered the civic church of Swansea. It was designated as Wales' first minster church by the Church in Wales in 2024.

There was a church on the site of St Mary's since circa 1328, erected by Henry de Gower, Bishop of Saint David's. One Sunday morning, in 1739, the roof of the nave collapsed into the church while the congregation was waiting to enter the building. The whole structure was re-built apart from the tower. 1822 saw the church being lit by gas for the first time with thirty six lamps. The church underwent complete renovation between 1879 and 1882 by Vicar Dr Morgan. In 1896, the church was flattened and rebuilt again under the designs of Arthur Blomfield by Dean Allan Smith, though some parts of the old church survived the re-development. In February 1941 the church was extensively damaged by Bombing during the Blitz. It was not rebuilt until the 1950s.

From the 1890s the Swansea Devil stood on a set of buildings facing the west side of the church, constructed by a disgruntled rival of Blomfield's, angry at the commissioning of Blomfield's designs over his own.

Above the church door, a carving of Jesus reigning in heaven by Nicholls of Lambeth in London is found, surrounded by the Evangelists in their traditional representations.

The church is known for its architectural features, community outreach programmes, and regular worship services that cater to a diverse congregation. St Mary's has been a focal point of Swansea's religious and cultural heritage for centuries.

== Swansea Minster ==
Wales saw the designation of its first minster church in 2024, as St. Mary's Church was officially granted minster status by the Church in Wales.

The dedication was part of the Church in Wales historic £10 m effort of evangelism throughout Wales, and reflects the importance of St. Mary's to the surrounding area. The dedication was presided over by His Grace The Most Rev. Andy John, Archbishop of Wales and Bishop of Bangor, in a special service on February 16, 2025.

== Stained glass ==
Since its post war restoration, Swansea Minister has been beautified with a valuable collection of 20th and 21st century stained glass. These include:

- North and south chancel windows showing Evangelists and other Biblical figures, designed by Edward Liddall Armitage and manufactured by James Powell and Sons, 1958–59.
- East chancel window of five lancets, showing Christ with the Four Evangelists, designed by Edward Liddall Armitage and manufactured by James Powell & Sons, 1959.
- Virgin window in north wall of Lady Chapel, designed by Edward Liddall Armitage and Marjorie Walters, manufactured by James Powell & Sons, 1960.
- In the Chapel of the Holy Trinity, behind the chancel, are two lancet windows glazed with abstract designs by John Piper and manufactured Patrick Reyntiens. Installed in 1965, they are positioned either side of a blue marble-effect dorsal painting also designed by Piper and painted by Peter Courtier, scenery maker at the Royal Opera House.
- Kuni Kajiwara's 1981 two-light Butterfly window in north aisle, manufactured by Swansea-based Glantawe Studios.
- Catrin Jones's two 1982 semi-abstract lancet windows either side of western portal, commemorating the wedding of Charles, Prince of Wales to Lady Diana Spencer.
- Rodney Bender's abstract-design 1985 double lancet window in the north wall of the north aisle, which commemorates Welsh Guards killed in the Falklands War. The design for the windows was inspired by Dylan Thomas' poem 'And Death Shall have no Dominion'.
- Lisa Burkl’s 1993 abstract-design window in west wall of south aisle on theme of Jacob’s Ladder. The window commemorates those who died in the Mannheim helicopter crash of 1982.
- Colwyn Morris's 1994 St Valentine and St Cecilia windows in north wall of chancel, manufactured by Glantawe Studios.
- John Edwards' 1999 children's window in north aisle, manufactured by Glantawe Studios.
- Martin Donlin's 2001 Millennium window in west wall, entitled God Will Be Their Light, based on Revelation 22 verve 5.

== Bells ==
The tower contains eight bells, which were cast in 1959 by John Taylor & Co, Loughborough with the heaviest weighing 20cwt - 2qr - 12lb (1049.2 kg) in "E". Details of the bells:-

Bell	Weight	Nominal Freq.	Note	Diameter	Year Cast	Foundry
1	5-1-10 (271.9 kg)	1326.0 Hz	E	28.25 inches (71.8 cm)	1959	John Taylor & Co
2	5-2-12 (285.5 kg)	1249.0 Hz	D#	29.13 inches (74.0 cm)	1959	John Taylor & Co
3	5-3-10 (297.3 kg)	1110.0 Hz	C#	30.50 inches (77.5 cm)	1959	John Taylor & Co
4	7-0-18 (364.6 kg)	986.0 Hz	B	32.75 inches (83.2 cm)	1958	John Taylor & Co
5	9-2-9 (487.8 kg)	876.0 Hz	A	36.50 inches (92.7 cm)	1959	John Taylor & Co
6	11-0-1 (560.5 kg)	825.0 Hz	G#	38.50 inches (97.8 cm)	1959	John Taylor & Co
7	15-0-3 (765.1 kg)	734.0 Hz	F#	43.13 inches (109.6 cm)	1959	John Taylor & Co
8	20-2-12 (1049.2 kg)	654.0 Hz	E	48.00 inches (121.9 cm)	1959	John Taylor & Co

== Gallery ==
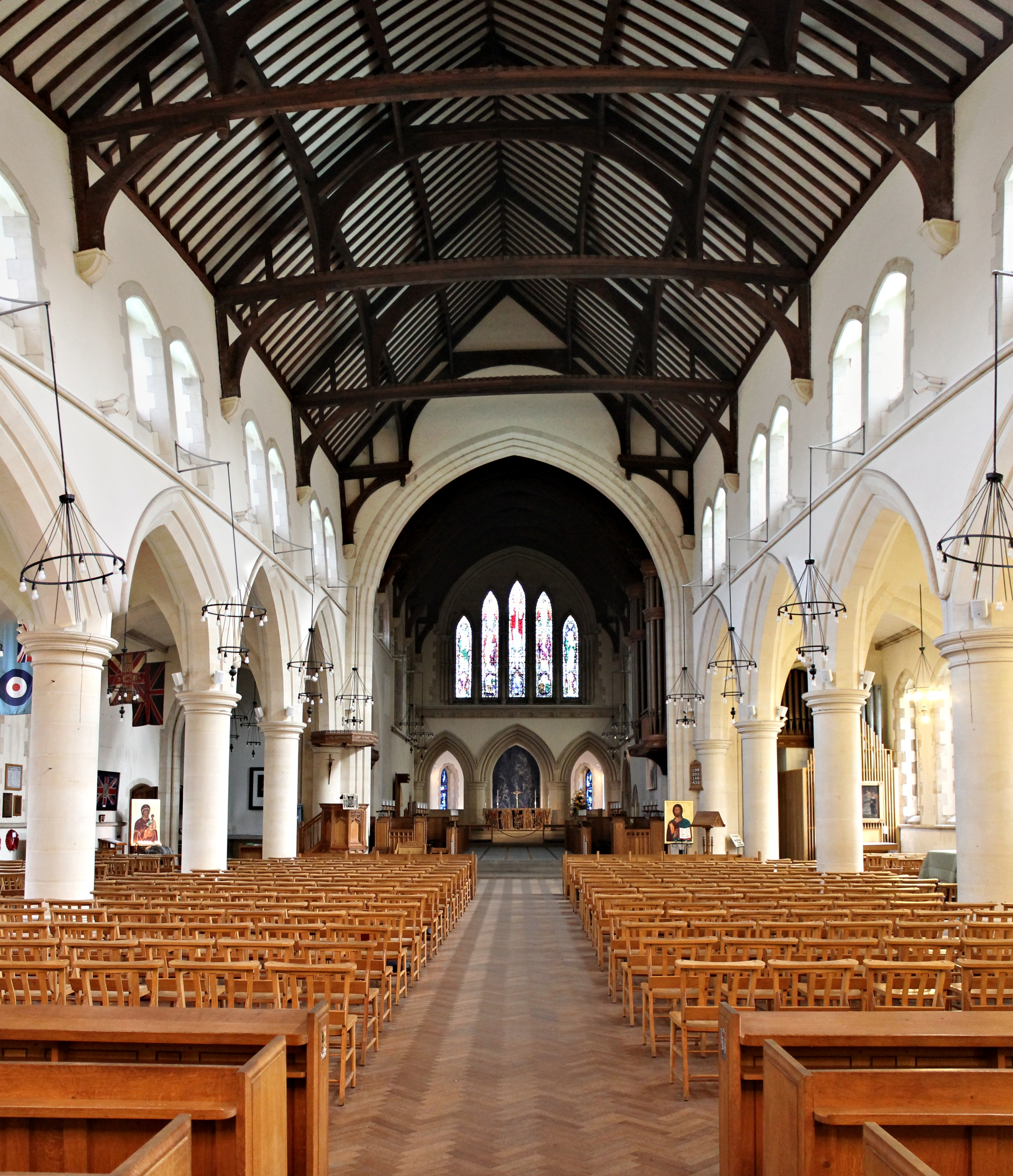
View looking east towards the altar.

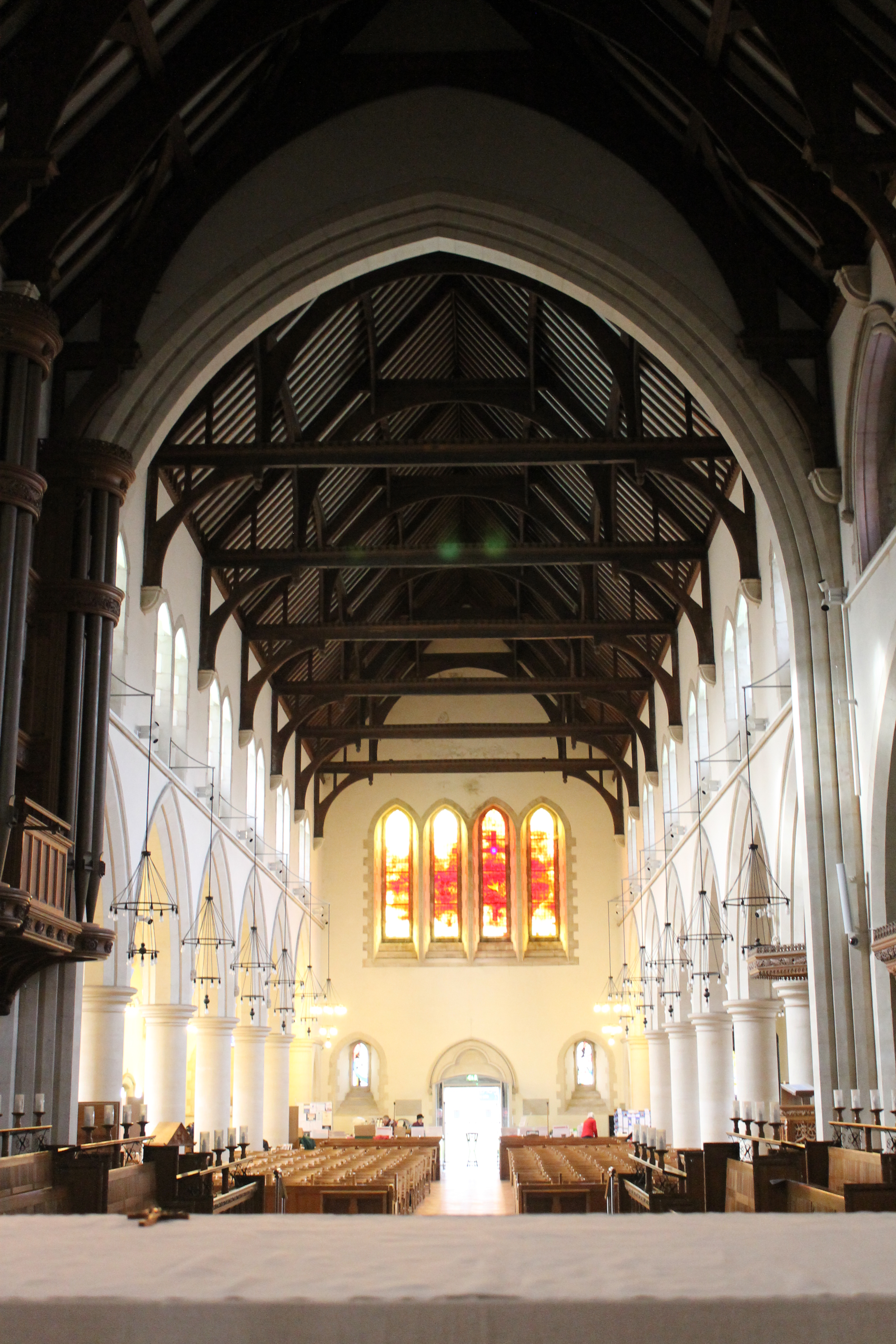
View looking west towards the back of the church.

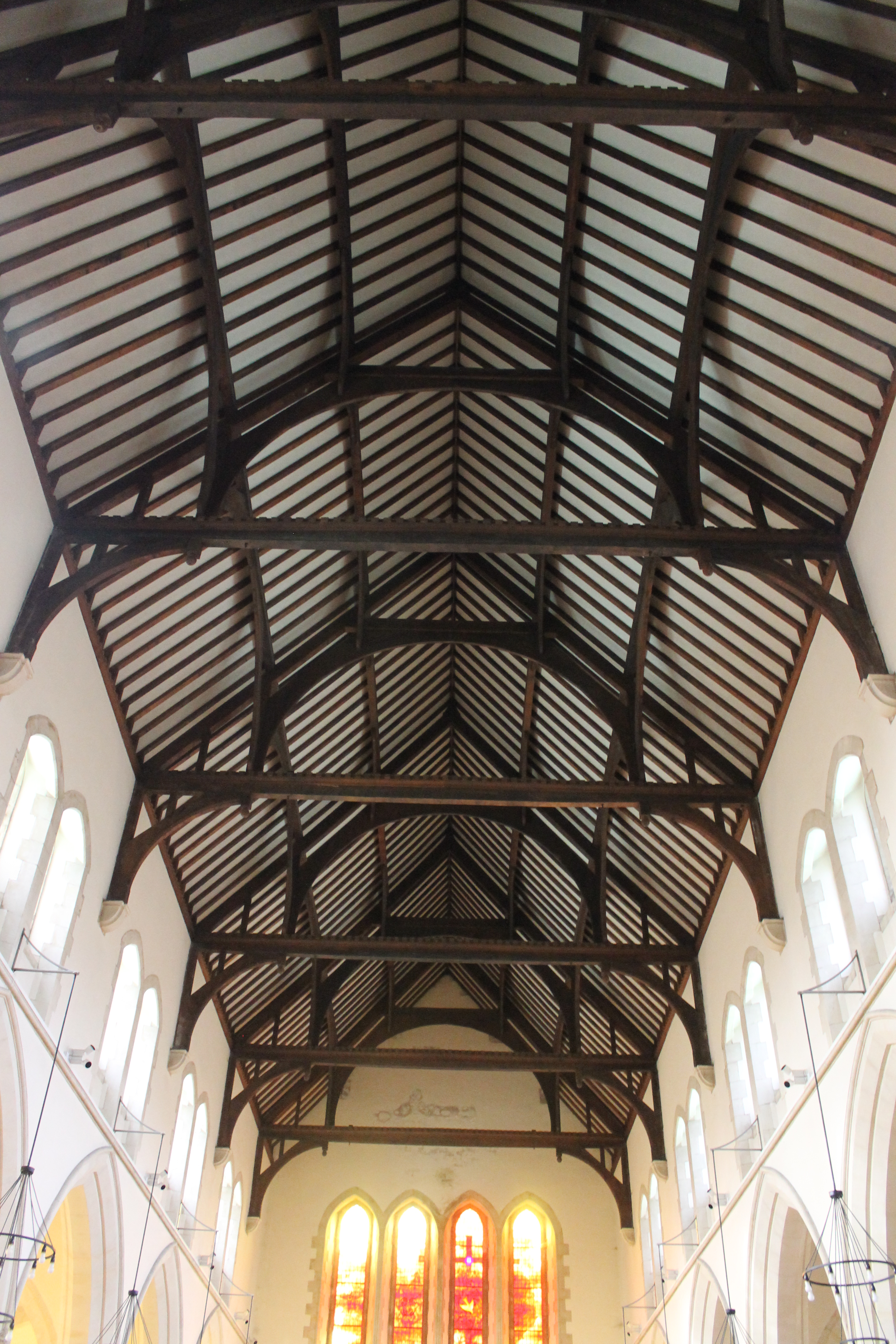
The ceiling of the nave.

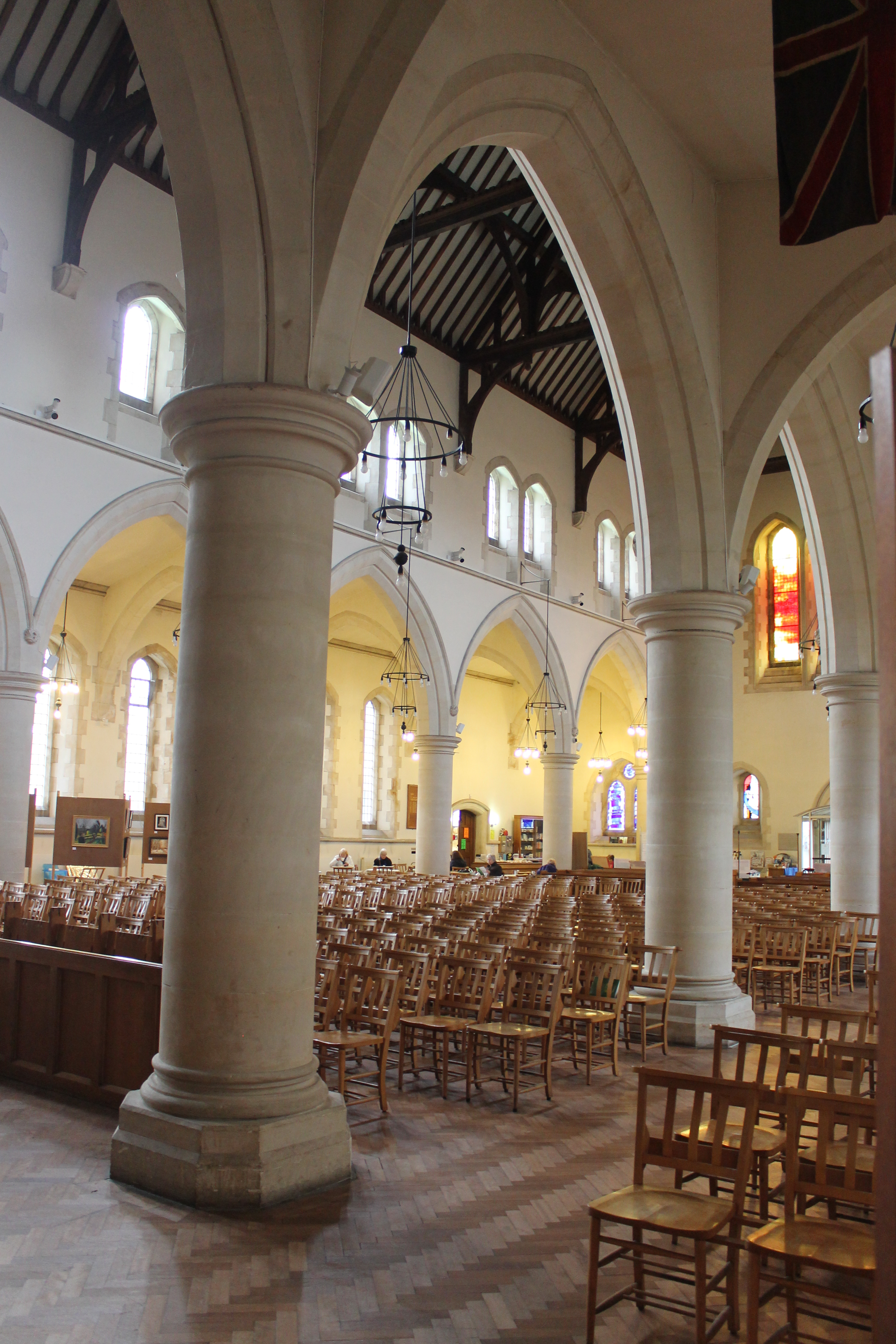
Aisle and columns.

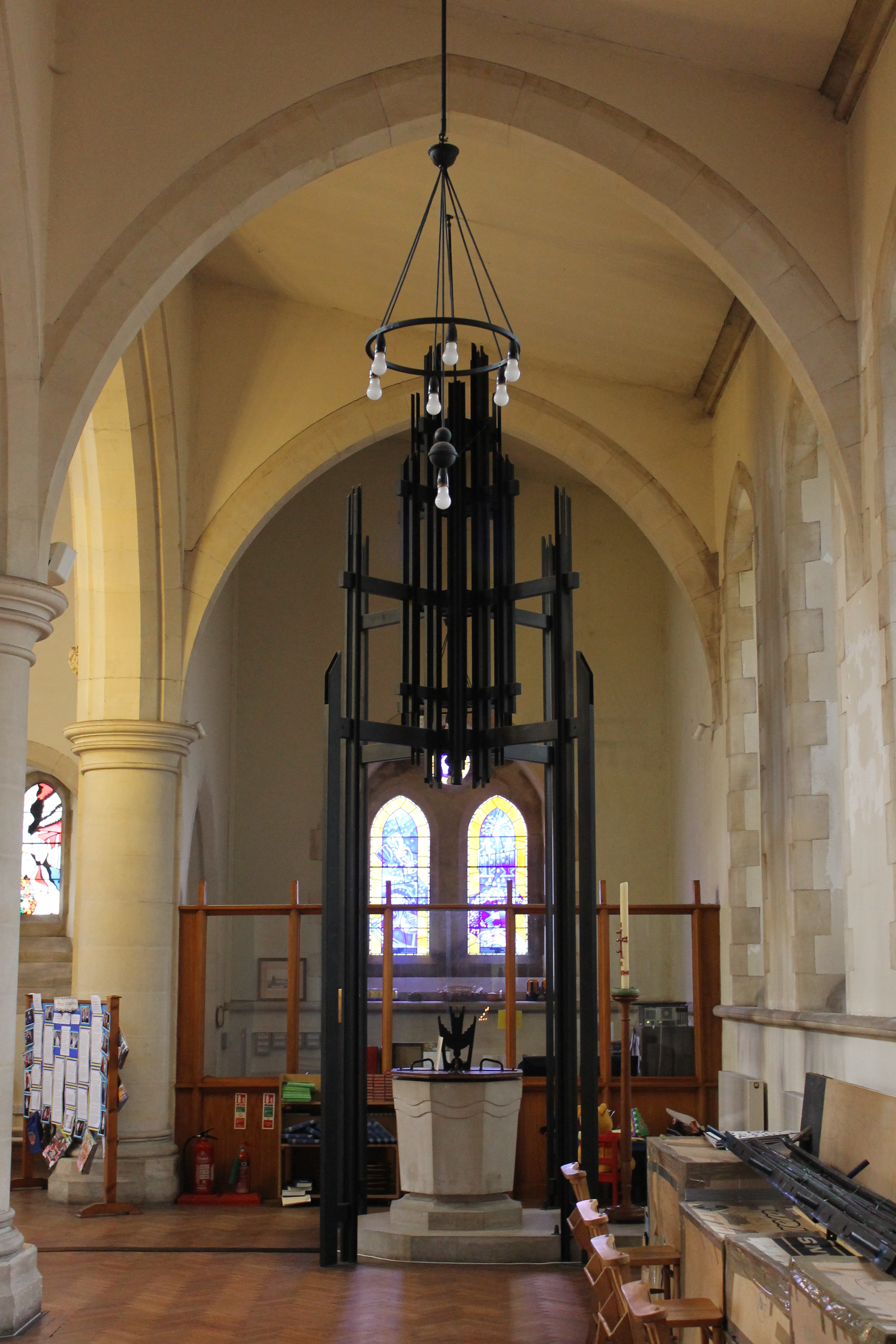
The Font with its steel canopy reflecting the industrial heritage of Swansea.

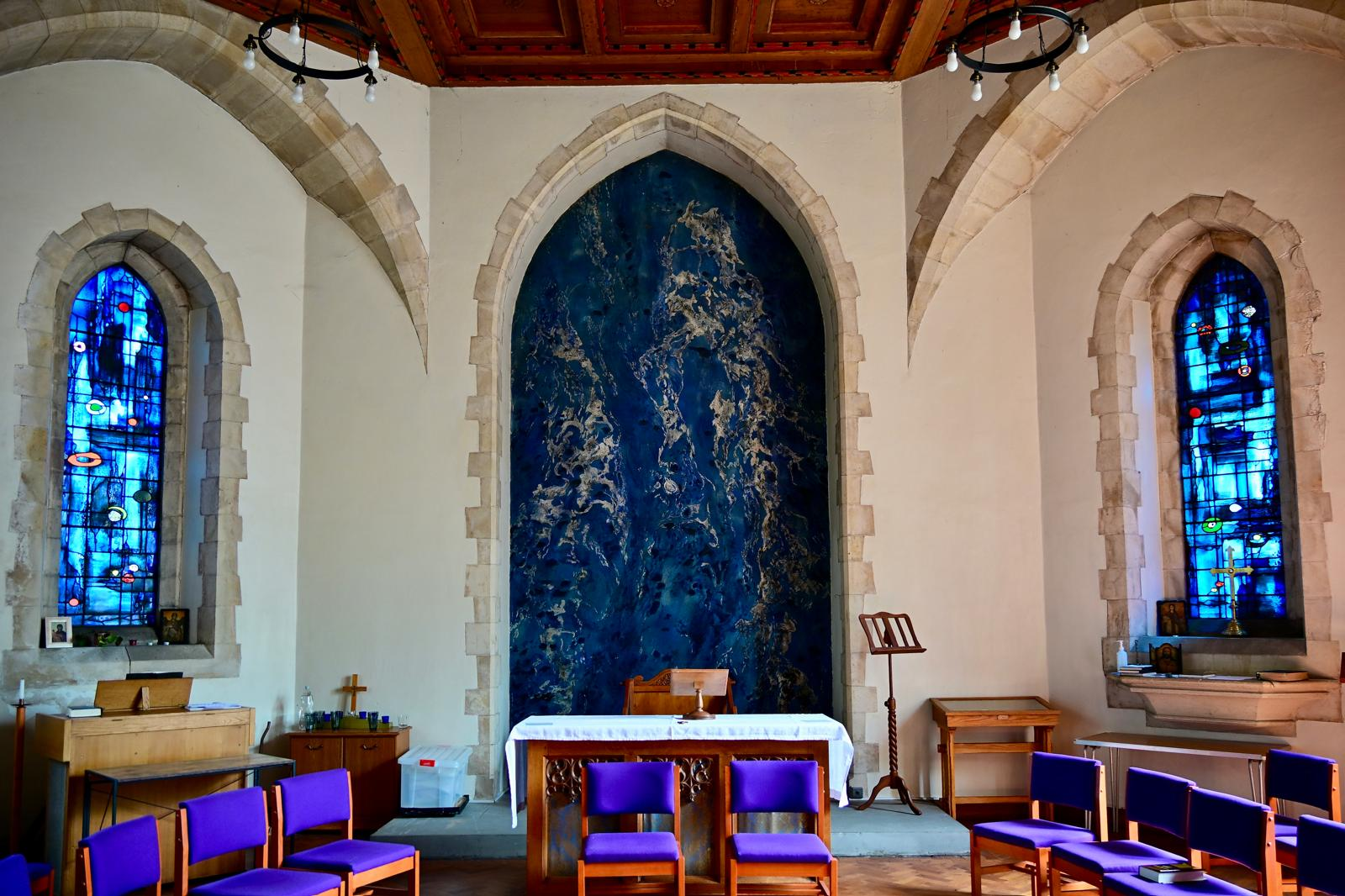
The Trinity Chapel, with dossal and windows designed by John Piper.

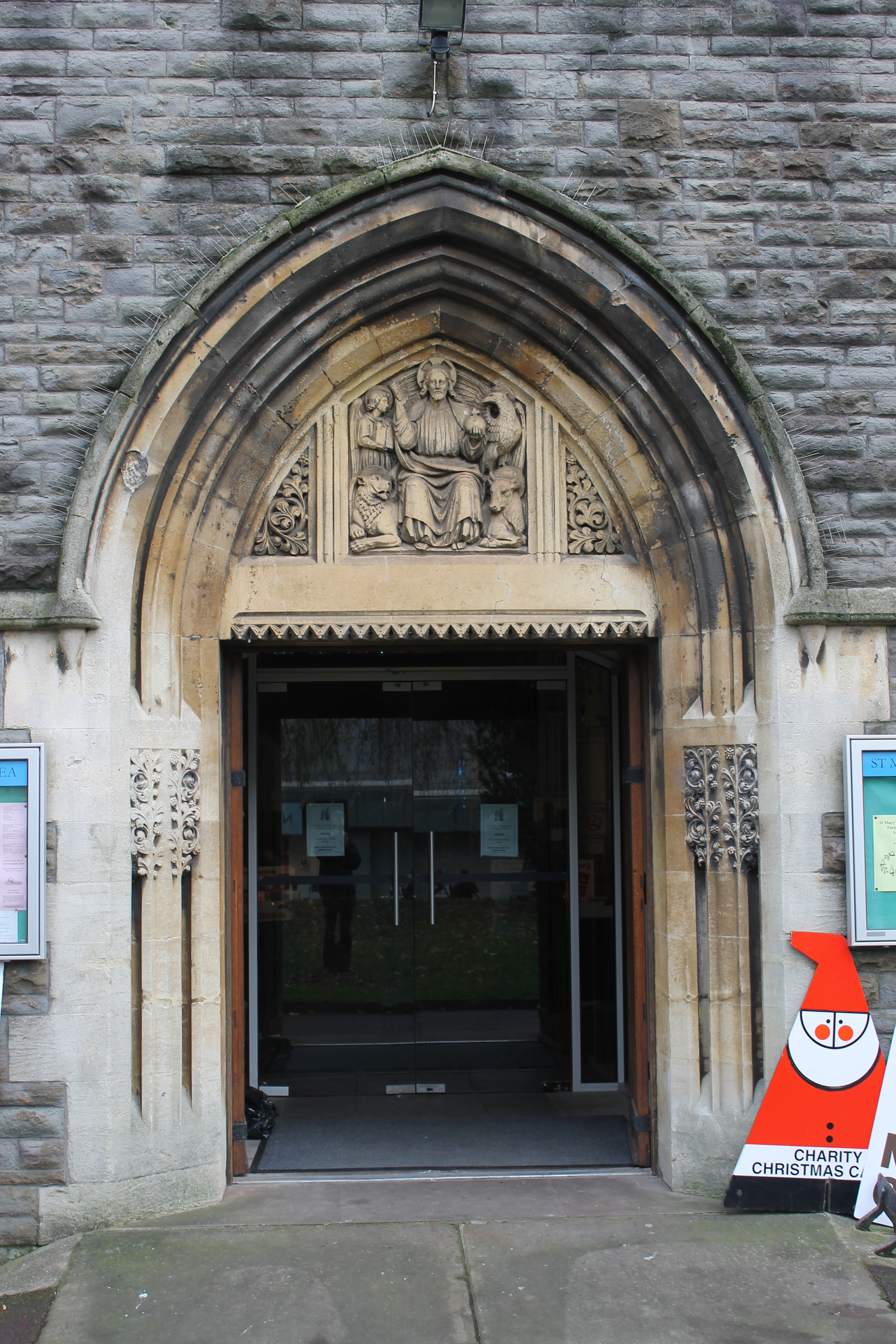
The west portal.

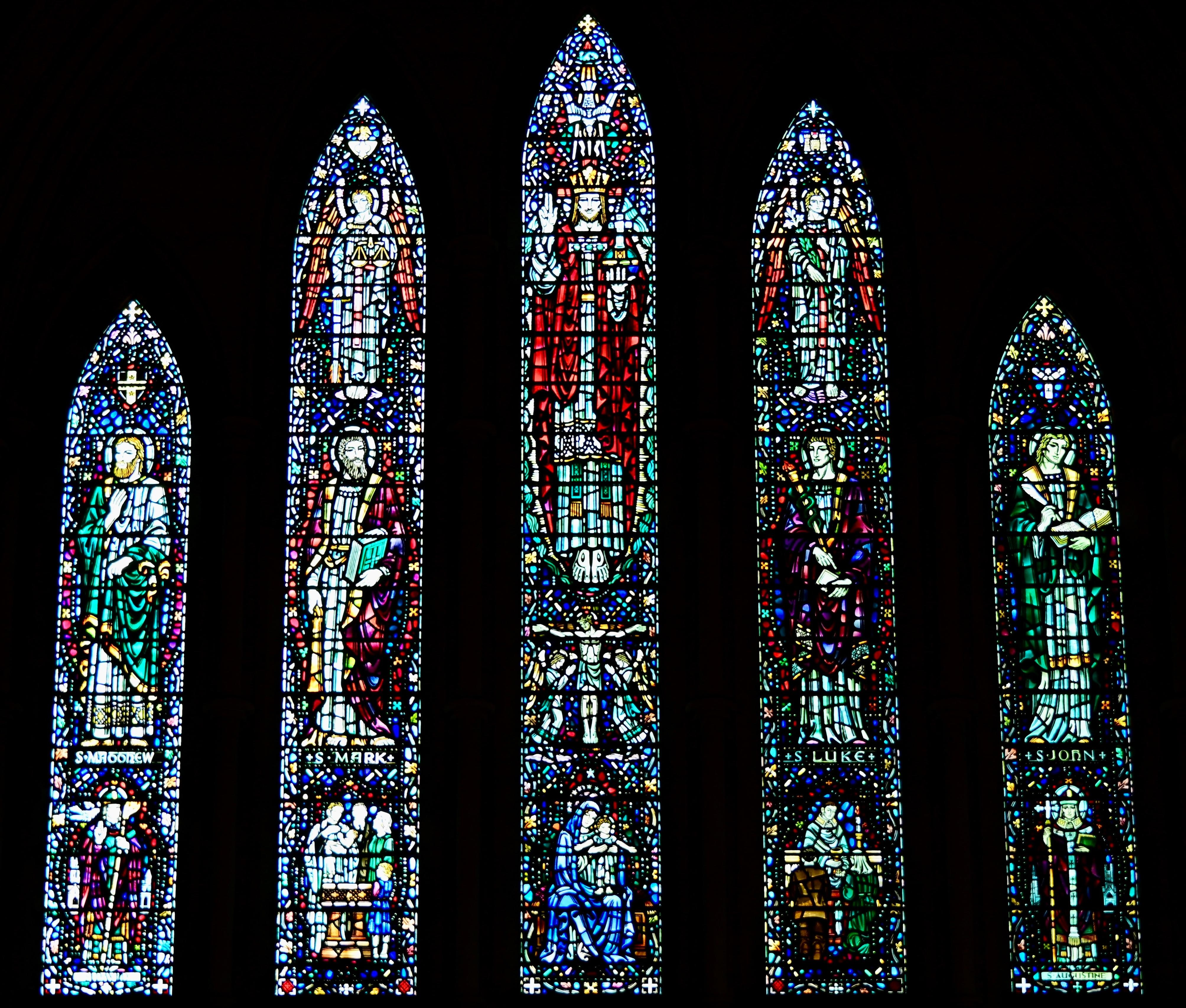
Christ and Evangelists east chancel window. Edward Liddall Armitage, 1959

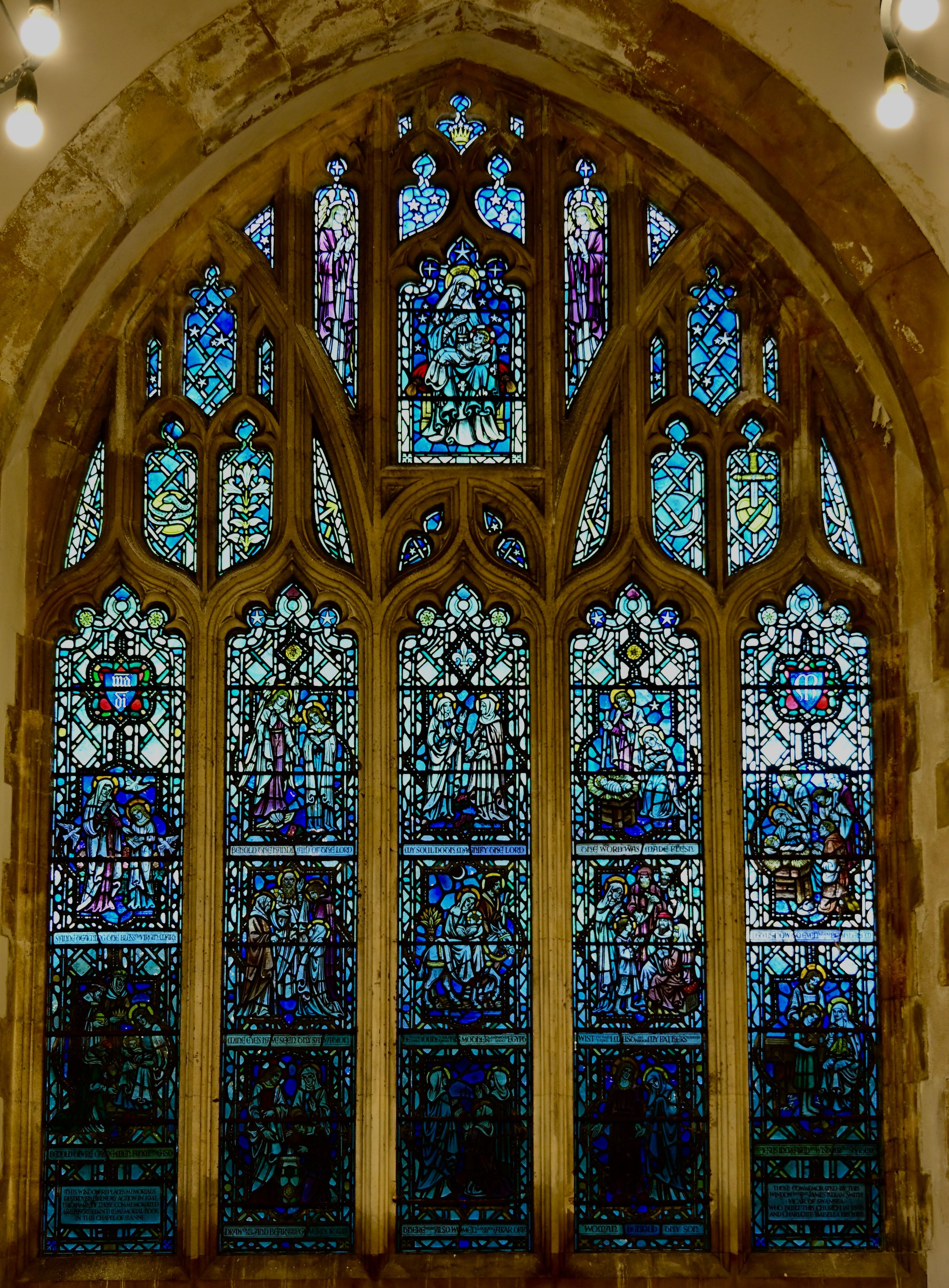
Lady Chapel window. Edward Liddall Armitage and Marjorie Walters, 1960

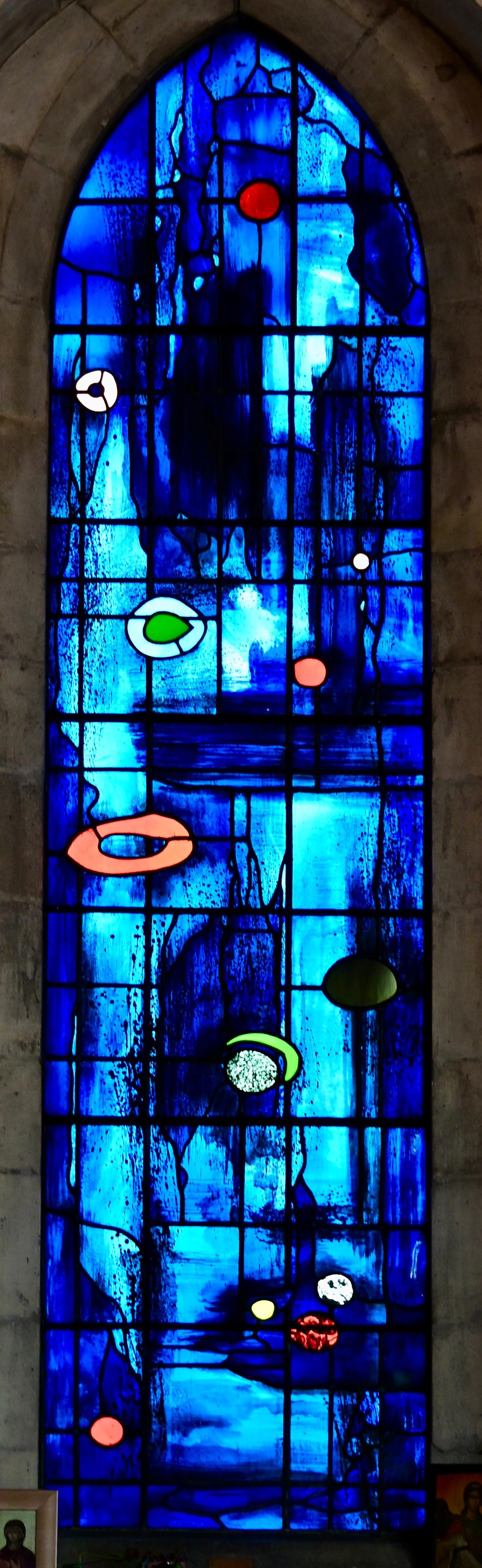
Trinity Chapel window, north. John Piper, 1965

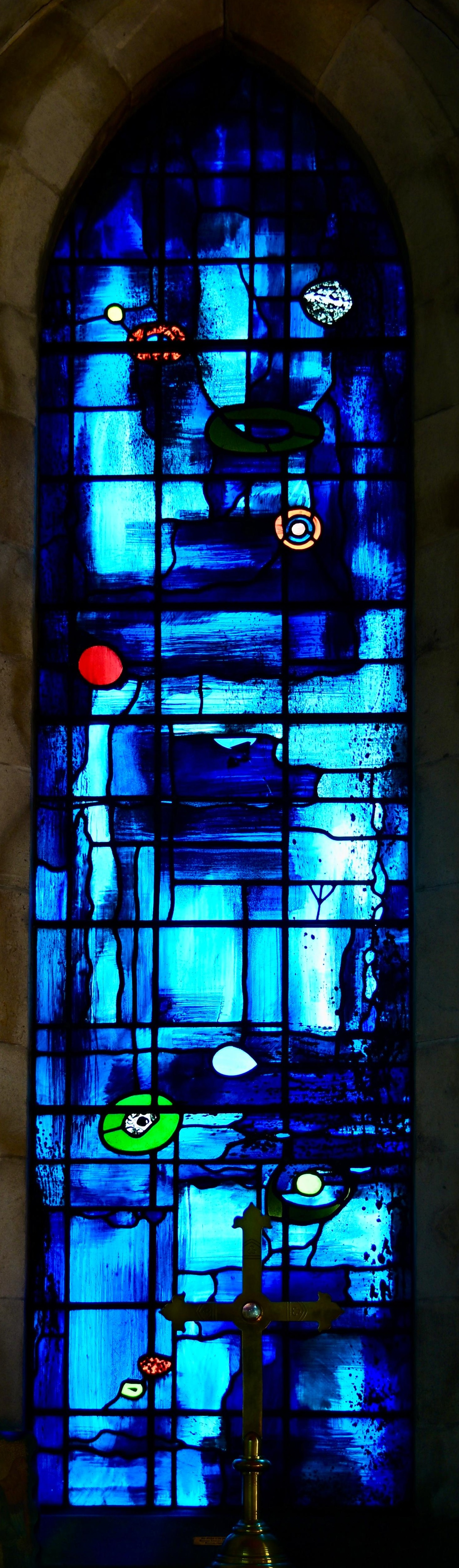
Trinity Chapel window, south. John Piper, 1965

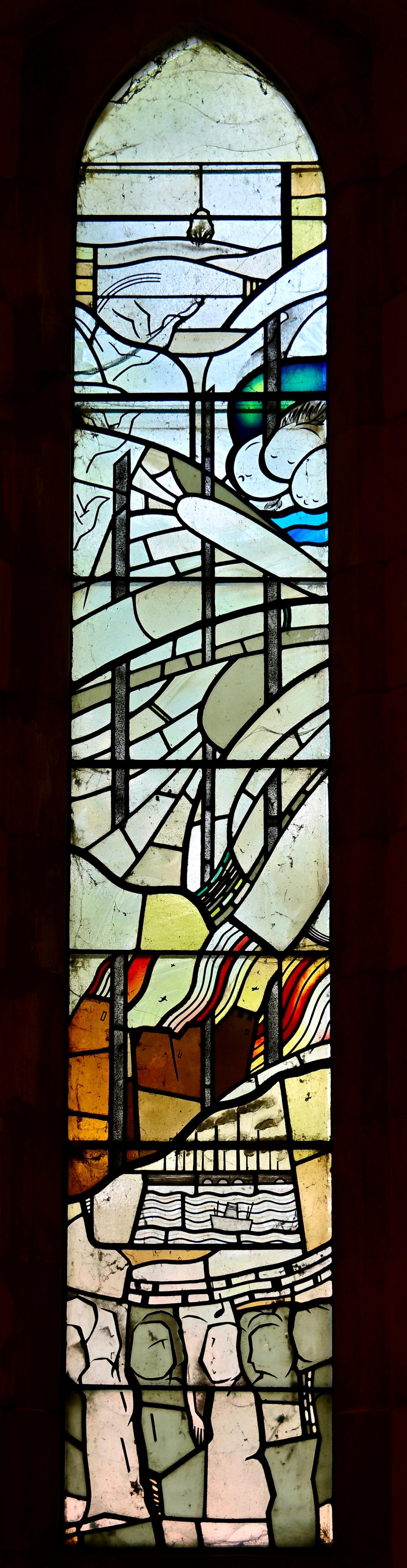
Butterfly window (left), Kuni Kajiwara, 1981

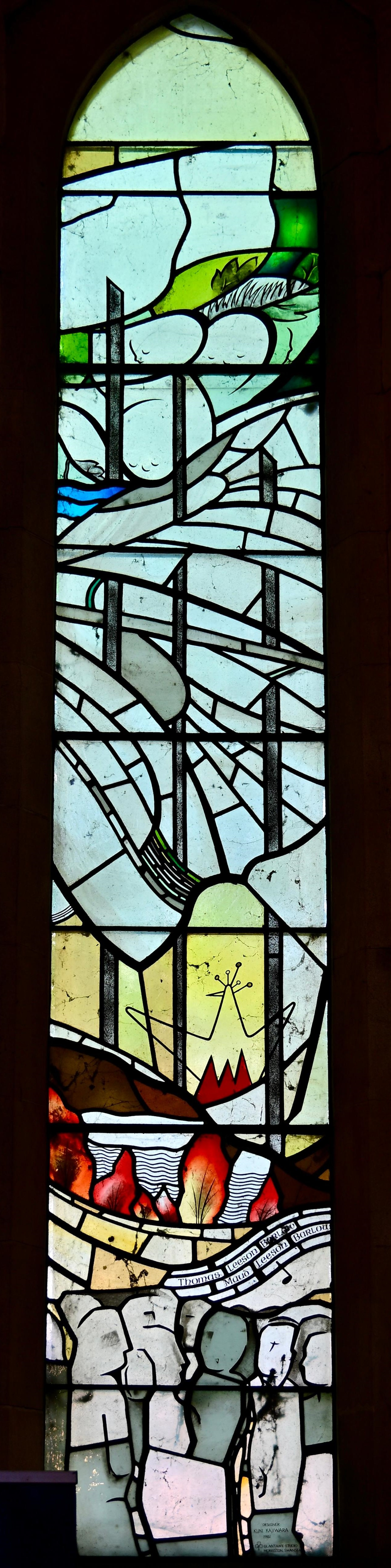
Butterfly window (right), Kuni Kajiwara, 1981

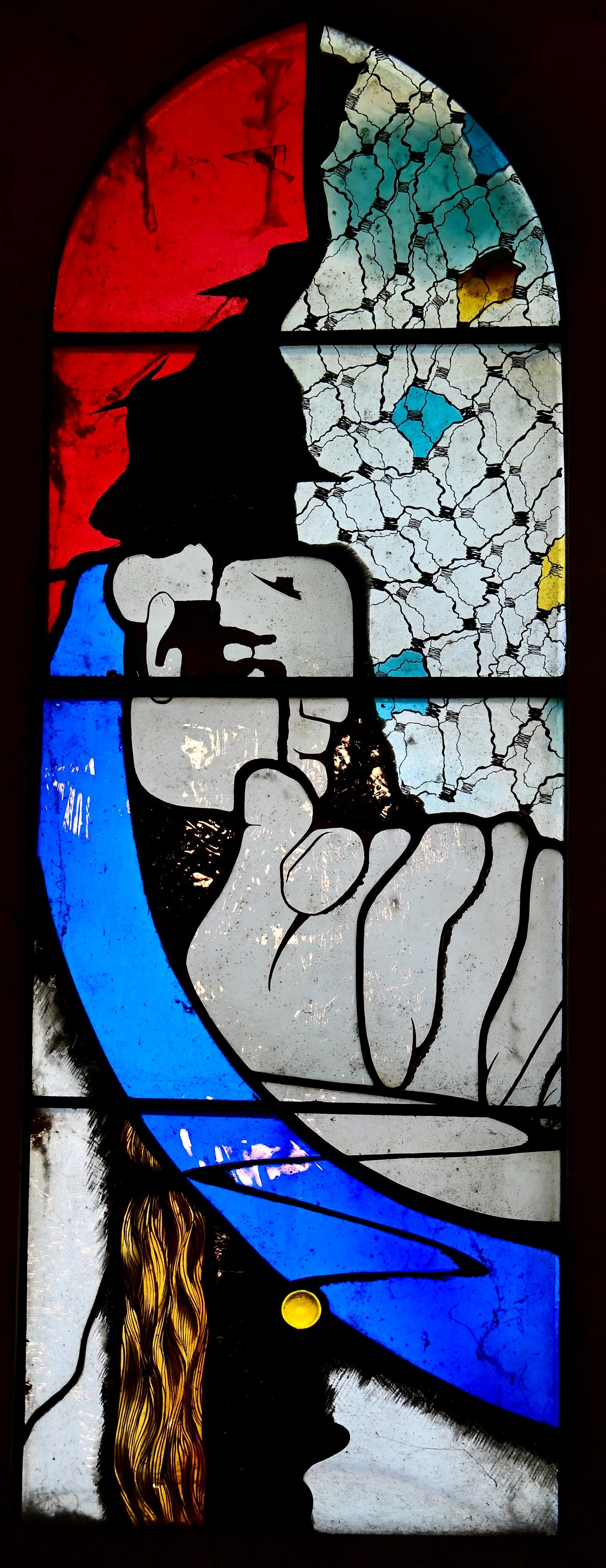
Royal Wedding window 1, Catrin Jones, 1982

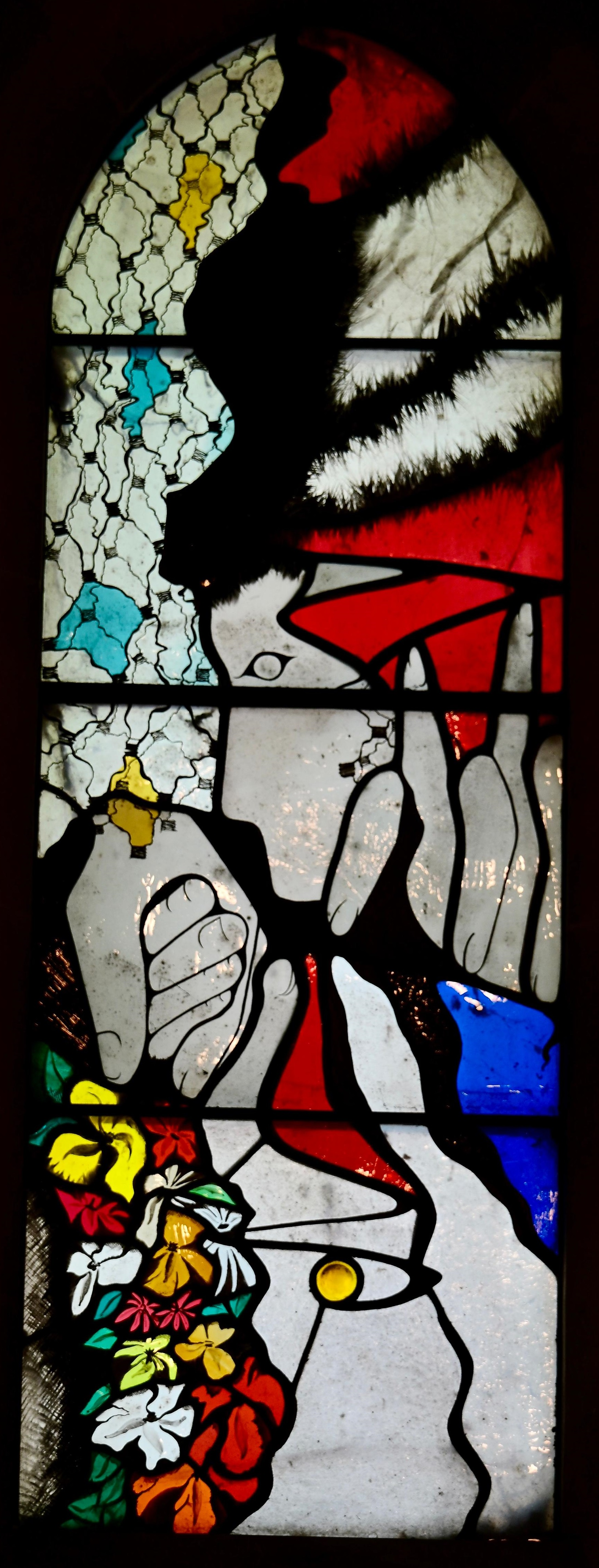
Royal Wedding window 2, Catrin Jones, 1982

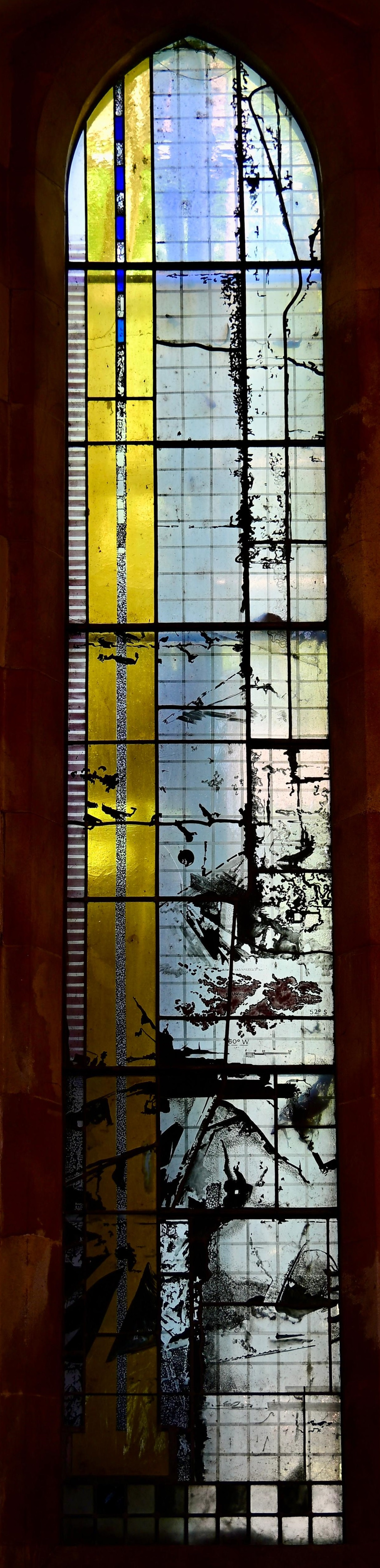
Welsh Guards Falklands Memorial window (left light), Rodney Bender, 1985

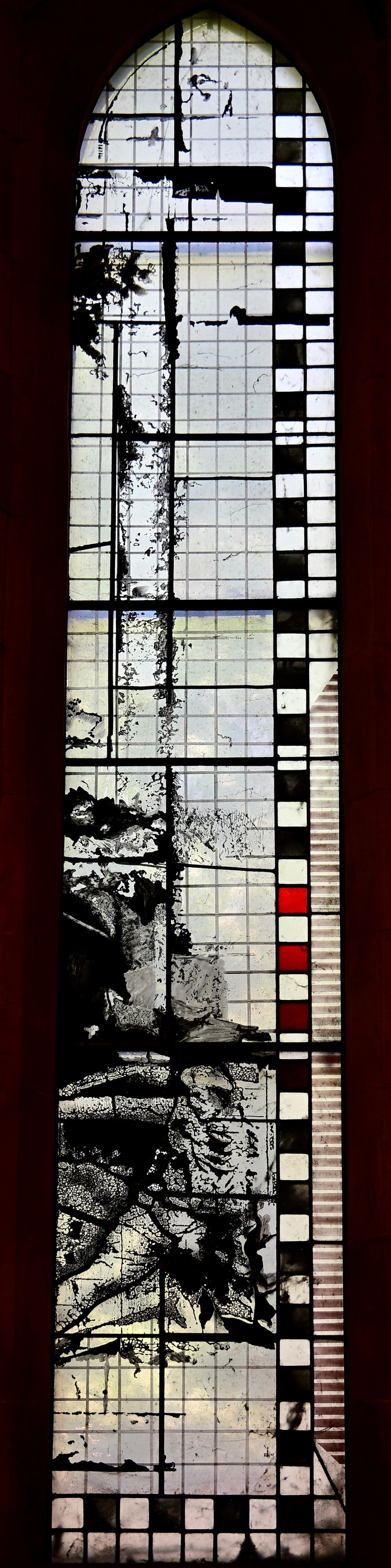
Welsh Guards Falklands Memorial window (right light), Rodney Bender, 1985

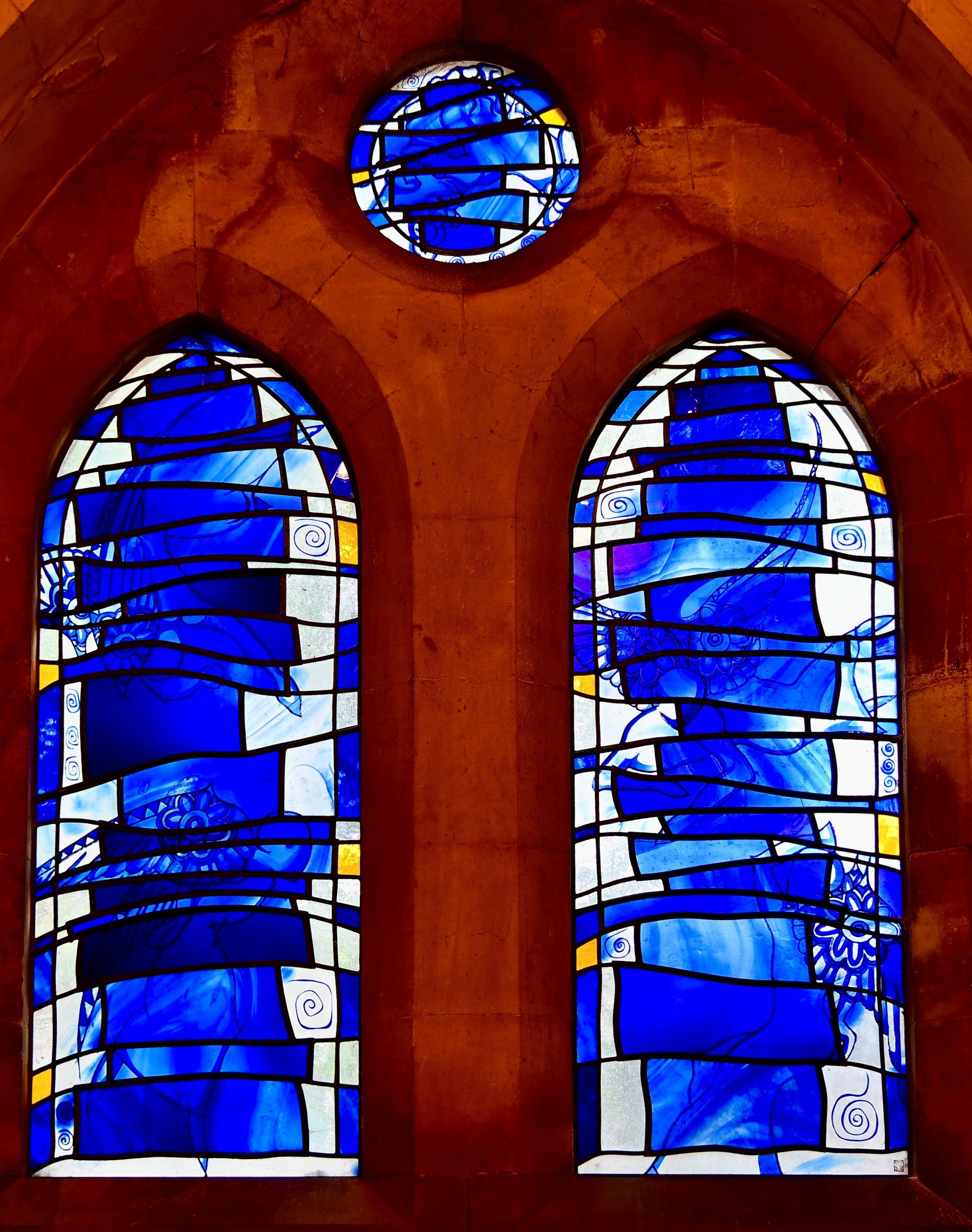
Jacob's Ladder window by Lisa Burkl, 1993

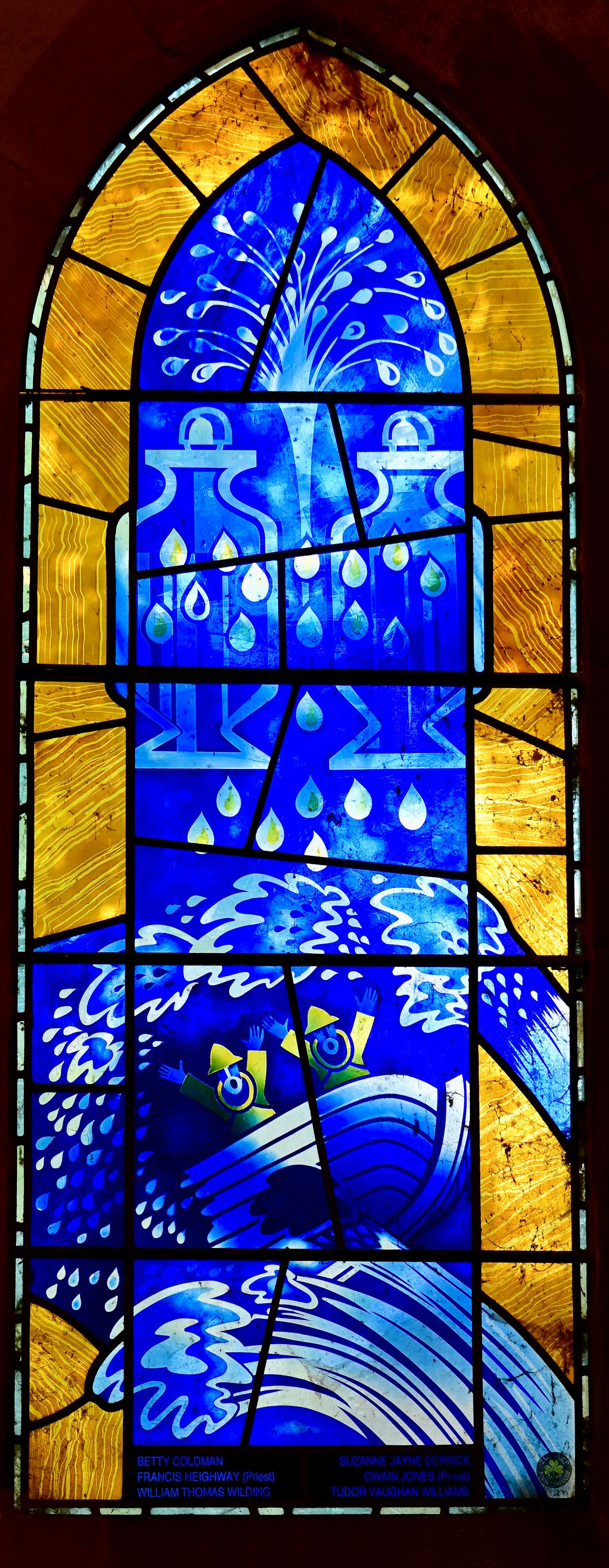
Children's Window (right light), John Edwards, 1999

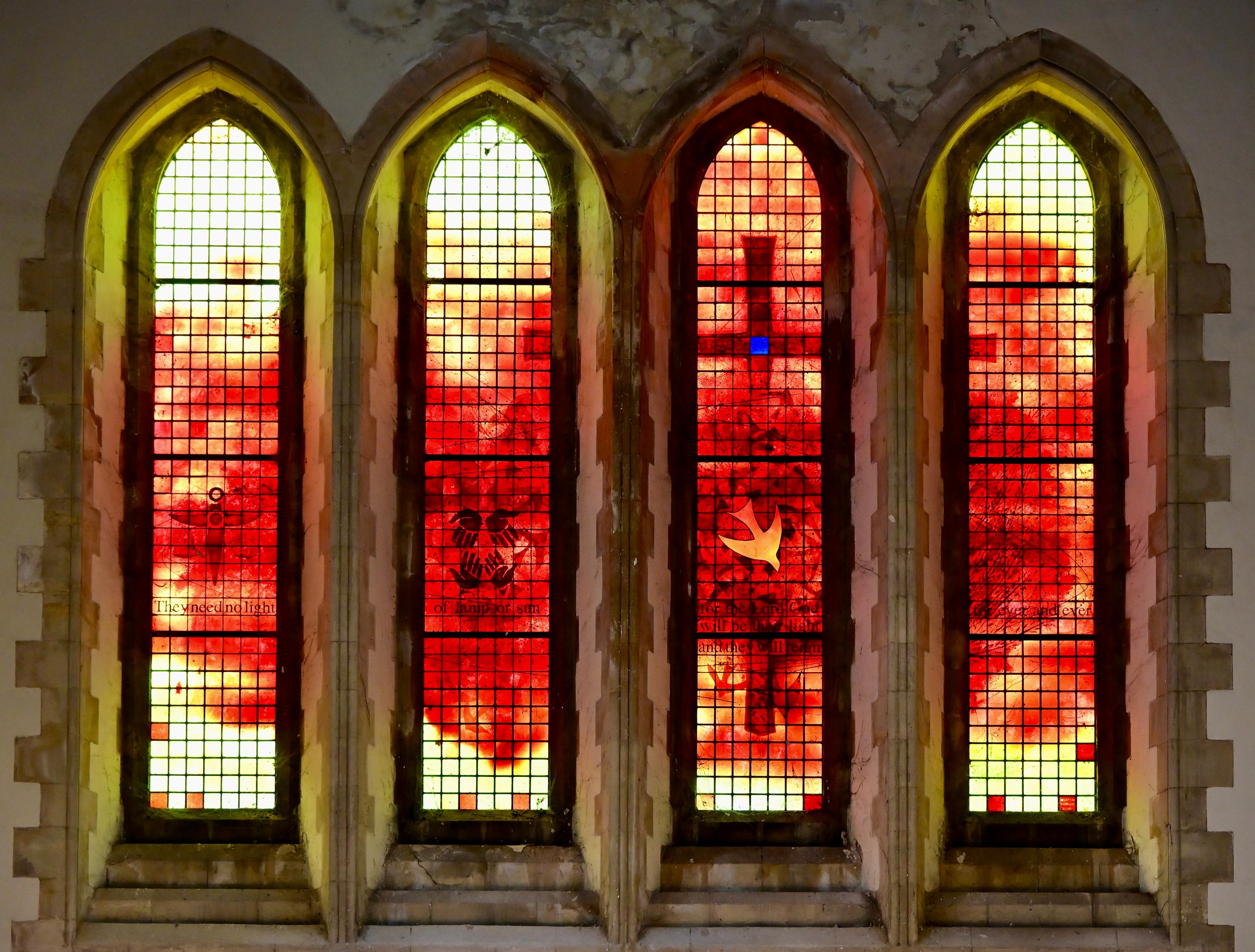
God Will Be Their Light window. Martin Donlin, 2001
