= Swansea Devil =

Wood carving of the devil said to be cursed

Coordinates: 51.617°N 3.938°W

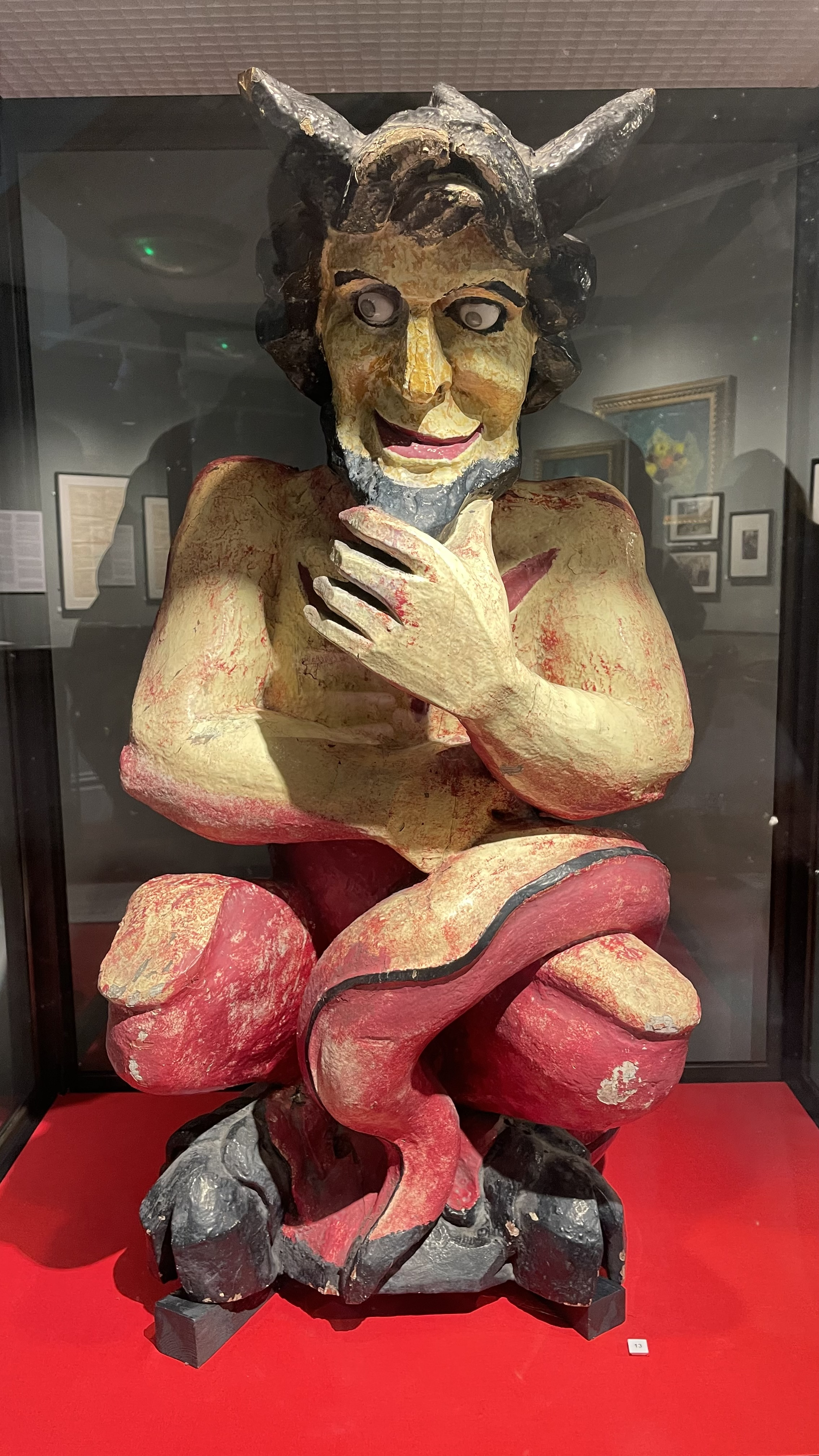
The Swansea Devil located in Swansea Museum

The Swansea Devil, also called Old Nick, is a wood carving of the Devil in Swansea, Wales. It was carved by an architect whose designs for St. Mary's Church had been rejected by a committee. Some years later when designing an office building across the road, he placed a carving of Satan facing the church and prophesied "When your church is destroyed and burnt to the ground my devil will remain laughing". This prophecy later came true when the church was bombed during the Second World War.

== History ==
In the 1890s it was decided that St. Mary's Church in the centre of Swansea would be rebuilt. The task of designing the new church was put to tender. Among those who applied were a local architect and Sir Arthur Blomfield. The committee accepted Blomfield's designs and the church was built. The local man took his rejection as a slight against his talent. After several years a row of cottages adjacent to the church became available for purchase. The offended architect bought these houses, and tore them down. In their place he erected a red brick building to house the brewery offices, on which he placed a carving of Satan, facing the church. The local man is reputed to have prophesied: "When your church is destroyed and burnt to the ground my devil will remain laughing."

== Blitz ==
Swansea, being a major strategic target in South Wales, was bombed heavily during World War II. One of the buildings destroyed during the three night blitz in February 1941 was St. Mary's Church. The building on which Old Nick was mounted was not hit and remained standing through the war thus allowing Old Nick to continue laughing over the burnt remains of the church.

== Post war ==
In 1962 the brewery offices were torn down, while St. Mary's was rebuilt to the original designs. The devil was left to rot in a garage in Hereford, until a local historian returned him to Swansea during the 1980s.

== Present day ==
Occupying the land of the brewery offices is now the Quadrant Shopping Centre, opened in 1979. Once returned to Swansea the devil was placed as close to his original location inside the shopping centre as possible without directly offending the church goers. There was notable religious objection to its reinstallation, and when the Quadrant was refurbished the carving was placed in storage. After public outcry aided by the local newspaper the South Wales Evening Post, the Devil was placed back once more to watch over St. Mary's.

In 2019, the carving was donated to the Swansea museum by the owners of the Quadrant.
