= Meleager and Atalanta (Jordaens, 1618) =

Painting by Jacob Jordaens

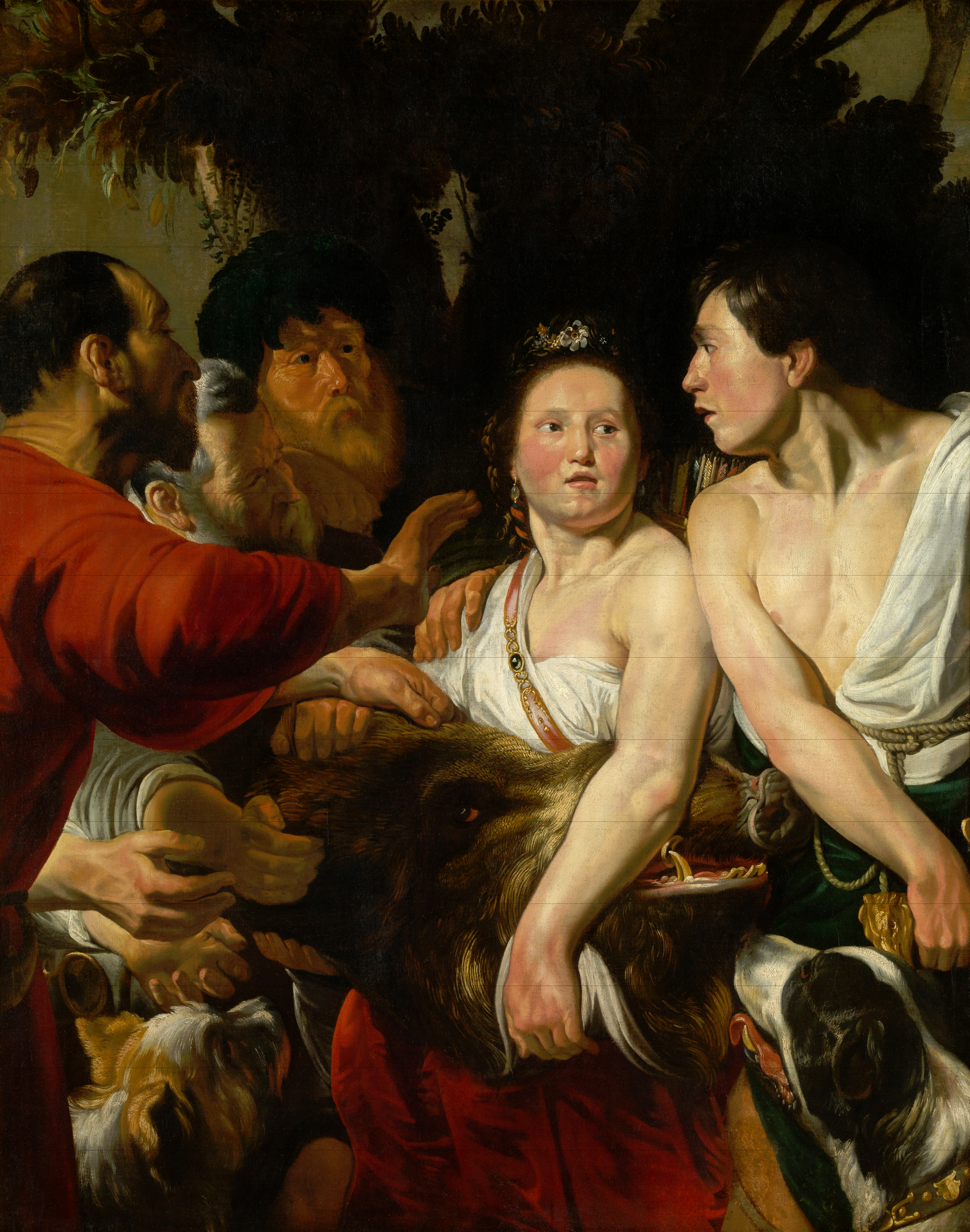
- Artist: Jacob Jordaens
- Year: 1610s
- Dimensions: 152 cm (60 in) × 120 cm (47 in)
- Location: Royal Museum of Fine Arts Antwerp
- Collection: Flemish Art Collection
- Accession no.: 844
- Identifiers: RKDimages ID: 8130; Bildindex der Kunst und Architektur ID: 20110184

Meleager and Atalanta is a 1618 oil-on-canvas painting by the Flemish artist Jacob Jordaens, now in the Royal Museum of Fine Arts Antwerp. Jordaens returned to the same subject of Meleager and Atalanta in a 1620-1650 painting, now in the Museo del Prado.
