= George Grant Francis =

Welsh antiquary and civic leader

George Grant Francis (10 January 1814 – 21 April 1882) was a Welsh antiquary and civic leader born in Swansea

== Early life ==
George Grant Francis can be seen as a product of the cross-pollination that took place on various levels between Devon/Cornwall and south Wales in the nineteenth century. During the period, the Bristol Channel became an important artery that transported cargo and people from one place to another, creating prosperous Anglo-Welsh communities with new, especially urban identities. Swansea was a classic case in point, and it was to this town that John Francis, George's father, came from Bridgwater in 1811. As an apprentice-served coachmaker, John Francis flourished in the rapidly-urbanising Swansea of the early nineteenth century, serving a newly minted clientele of industrialists, merchants, professionals and civic leaders. After marrying Mary Grant, the couple's eldest child, George, was born in January 1814.

He was educated at the Swansea high school. His younger brother John Deffett Francis was a famous Victorian painter.

== Antiquarian work ==
The abiding passion of Grant Francis's life was his love of history - especially that of Swansea and its environs. He was elected F.S.A. 16 January 1845, was its honorary secretary for South Wales, and was also a corresponding member of the Society of Antiquaries of Scotland and of the Welsh Manuscripts Society.

He was entrusted by the town council with the restoration and arrangement of their neglected muniments. The preservation and restoration of Oystermouth Castle, near Swansea—one of the many ancient ruins pertaining to the house of Beaufort, lords of Gower and Kilvey—were also owing to his exertions, for which he was presented with a piece of plate.

== Later life ==
Francis took a prominent part in local issues. His numerous schemes for improvements tended to be weak financially. He was active in restoring to public use the ancient grammar school of Bishop Gore, of which he was many years chairman and one of the trustees. In 1851 Francis was selected to represent the Swansea district as local commissioner at the Great Exhibition. The same year the British Association appointed him secretary to its department of ethnology when holding its meeting at Swansea.

He was mayor of the borough in 1854, and was also Lieutenant-Colonel of the 1st Glamorganshire Artillery Volunteers, a corps raised by his exertions in 1859.

Francis died at his town house, 9 Upper Phillimore Place, Kensington, 21 April 1882 aged 68, and was buried on the 26th in his wife's family tomb at Danygraig Cemetery, Swansea. By his marriage in 1840 to Sarah, eldest daughter of John Richardson of Swansea, and of Whitby Lodge, Northumberland, he left three sons.

== Works ==
In 1835 he helped to found the Royal Institution of South Wales, and presented it with his collections of local fossils, antiquities, coins, and seals, together with a library of works relating to Wales (of which he compiled and printed a catalogue, later adding a supplementary volume). He shared in the formation of the Cambrian Archæological Association in 1846, and contributed to its journal, Archæologia Cambrensis. To the volume for 1848 he sent for insertion the original contract of affiance between Edward of Carnarvon, prince of Wales, and Isabella, daughter of Philip the Fair, king of France, dated at Paris 20 May 1303, which he had discovered in Swansea Castle. It was printed separately the same year. His connection with the school enabled him to collect materials for his book, ‘'The Free Grammar School, Swansea; with brief Memoirs of its Founders and Masters, and copies of original deeds, Swansea, 1849. He printed privately copies of '‘Charters granted to Swansea. ... Translated, illustrated, and edited by G. G. Francis, Latin and English, London, 1867.

In 1867 Francis sent to the Swansea newspaper, The Cambrian papers which he had discovered in the Record Office on the metallurgy of the district. He then printed fifty copies for presents as The Smelting of Copper in the Swansea District, from the Time of Elizabeth to the Present Day, Swansea, 1867. He later republished it in 1881, illustrated with autotype portraits of men connected with the copper trade, and sketches of places connected with copper smelting. From original documents among the Gnoll papers at Neath, Francis expanded this second edition.

Francis wrote many other monographs on Welsh history and topography, including:

- Original Charters and Materials for a History of Neath and its Abbey, with illustrations, now first collected, 8vo, Swansea, 1845 (fifty copies privately printed).
- The Value of Holdings in Glamorgan and Swansea in 1545 and 1717, shown by rentals of the Herbert Family. Edited from the originals, Swansea, 1869 (twenty-five copies printed).
- Notes on a Gold Chain of Office presented to the Corporation of Swansea in … 1875, … together with a list of [mayors] from 1835 to 1875, Swansea, London (printed), 1876.

He also assisted Lewis Weston Dillwyn in his Contributions towards a History of Swansea, Swansea, 1840, joined the Rev. Thomas Bliss in writing Some Account of Sir Hugh Johnys, Deputy Knight Marshal of England, temp. Henry VI and Edward IV, and of his Monumental Brass in St. Mary's Church, Swansea, Swansea, 1845, and helped Dr. Thomas Nicholas in the compilation of the Annals and Antiquities of the Counties and County Families of Wales, 1872, 1875.

== Arms ==
Coat of arms of George Grant Francis
Crest A lion statant Proper Escutcheon Quarterly, 1, Gules, on a bend Or between two bezants, three lions' heads erased Proper (Francis); 2, Argent, three leopards' heads Azure (Atwell); 3, Gules three antique crowns Or (Grant); 4, Or, a fess chequey Argent and Azure (Stuart). Motto Spes mea in Deo (My hope in God)
