= Meleager and Atalanta (Jordaens, 1620–1650) =

Painting by Jacob Jordaens

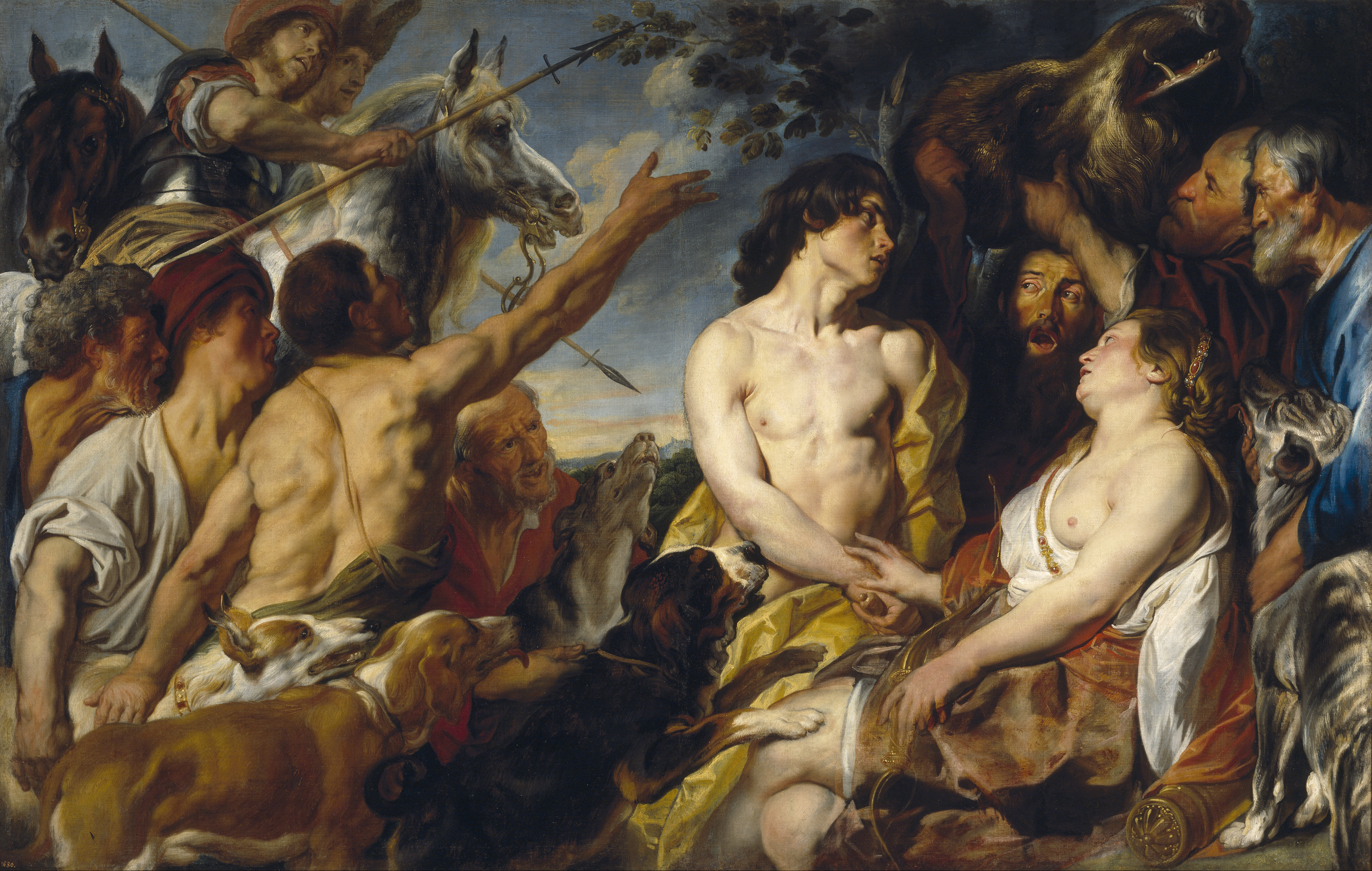
- Year: 1620–1623
- Medium: Oil on canvas
- Movement: Flemish Baroque
- Dimensions: 152.3 cm × 240.5 cm (60.0 in × 94.7 in)
- Location: Museo del Prado; Madrid

Meleager and Atalanta is a 1620–1623 painting by Jacob Jordaens, now in the Museo del Prado in Madrid.

A previously unknown study on panel for the painting was identified in the Swansea Museum by Bendor Grosvenor (using the Art UK website) as part of the British BBC4 television programme Britain's Lost Masterpieces. Conservation treatment was carried out by Simon Rollo Gillespie to repair the damaged panel and remove layers of disguising overpaint. The discovery was made at a time when the museum's future was threatened by budget cuts. The value of the painting is estimated at £3 million.

Jordaens also painted an earlier work on the subject of Meleager and Atalanta.
