= John Deffett Francis =

British artist and collector

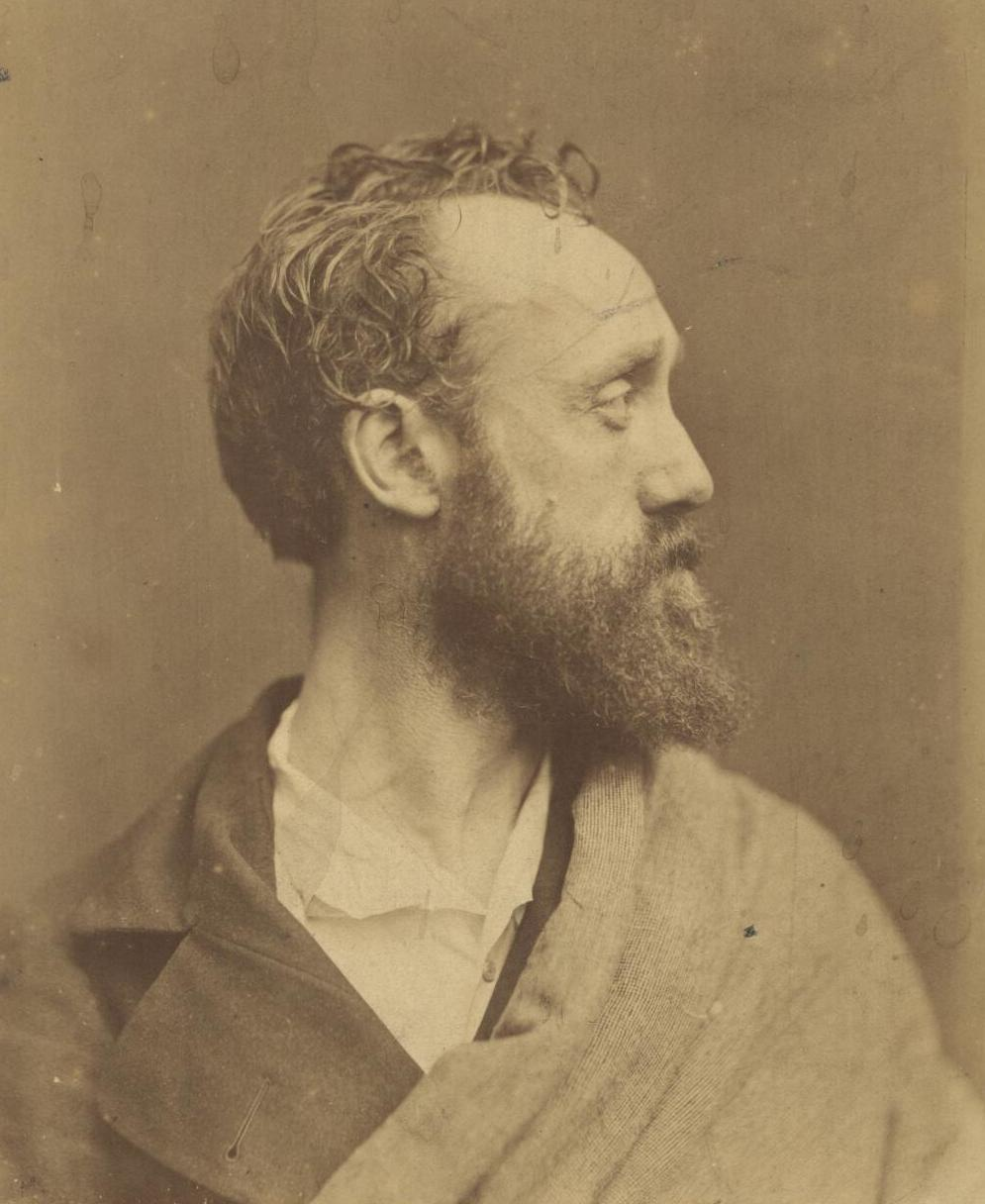
- Born: 2 June 1815; Swansea
- Died: 21 February 1901; Swansea
- Occupations: Painter, art collector, drawer, patron of the arts
- Relatives: George Grant Francis

John Deffett Francis (2 June 1815 – 21 February 1901) was a Welsh portrait painter and art collector. He is particularly well known for his portraits of figures such as Queen Victoria and the British prime minister Sir Robert Peel, and the bequests of his personal library and art collection to Swansea Library and the British Museum.

== Early life in Swansea ==
Francis was born in Swansea in south Wales. He was the son of a Swansea coach builder, John Francis and his wife Mary. According to the Welsh historian T. Mardy Rees, Francis demonstrated an early aptitude for painting and 'attracted notice by his designs and paintings in his father's workshop'. As he grew older, Francis concentrated his energy on portraiture and executed several portraits of notable figures in Carmarthen and Glamorgan, while he lived in Swansea. Later, he became a member of the Dolly Hunting Club and received commission for portraits from fellow members.

== Career in London ==
In the 1840s Francis traveled to London to develop his career as a portrait painter. While in London he befriended the artist and caricaturist Joseph Kenny Meadows and the writer Charles Dickens whom he accompanied on expeditions to the slums, to help discover material for Dickens' books. While in London, Francis also met John Ruskin and William Thackeray. In 1857, he became a founding member of the Savage Club, a literary gentleman's society, attending the society's first meeting in Drury Lane with William Brough, Leicester Silk Buckingham and William Bernhardt Tegetmeier among others. It is also possible that Francis was responsible for the name of the Society since 'it was he who presented the Club with the tomahawks, assegais and other savage weapons that decorated the walls of the Club.'

== Portrait painting and engraving ==
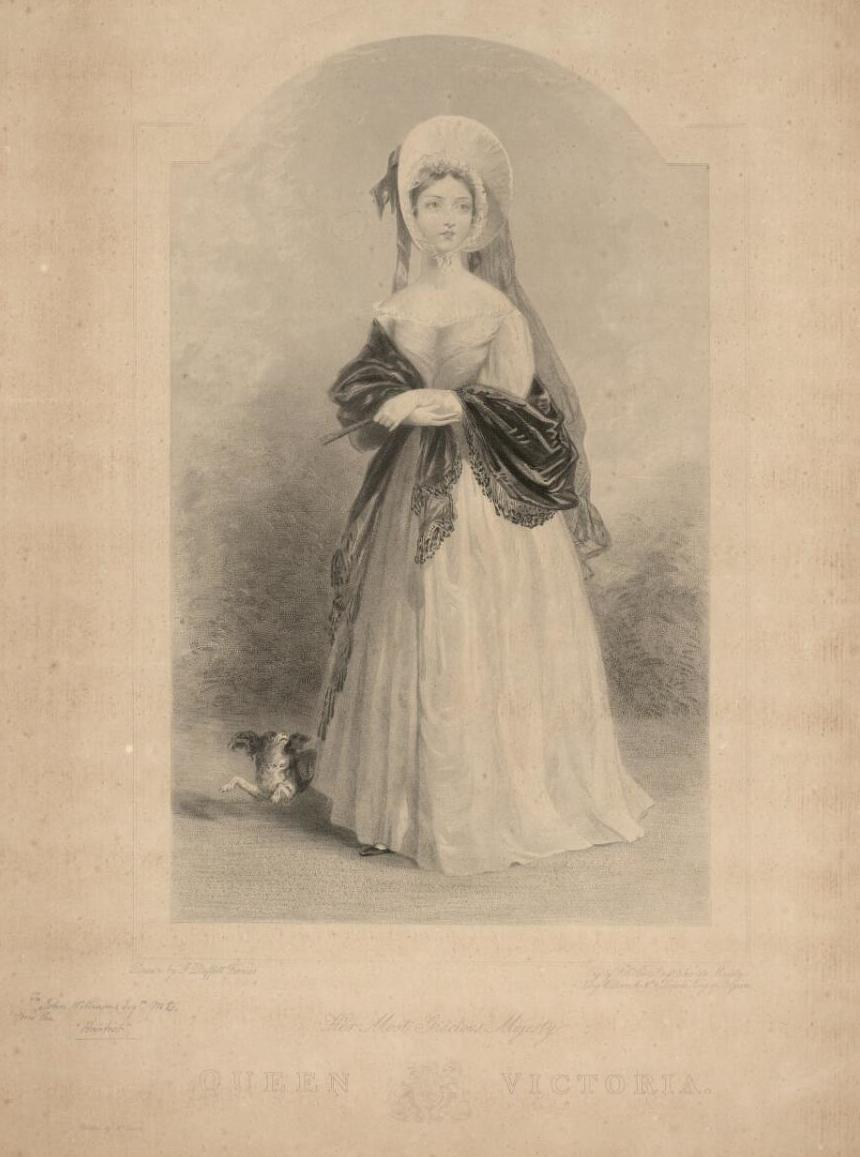
Portrait of Queen Victoria by John Deffett Francis, print, stipple engraving, 1838.

Francis was most successful as a figure and portrait painter. During his artistic career he completed a number of portraits of well known societal and political figures including Queen Victoria and Sir Robert Peel. Deffett's watercolour portrait of Queen Victoria (pictured on the right), displays the monarch with her dog, Dash, bounding by her side. The young monarch stands in a garden, elegantly attired in a bonnet and shawl. The painting was executed in 1837, the year that Queen Victoria assumed the throne, which may account for her youthful appearance. The painting was engraved and printed by Frederick Christian Lewis in 1838, a year after its original completion, and is still held in the Royal Collection. Prints made after John Deffett Francis' figurative portrait paintings include: Madlle. Cerito: A Dancer (1858); Emma Romer, lithograph (n.d.); Fanny Cerito (1846); W.C. Macready (n.d.); Major General Sir William Nott, (1845); Captain Bowen Davies (1844) and Robert Peel (1841), and form part of the bequest made to the British Museum.

== Other works ==
Aside from some notable portrait commissions, Francis' work did not attract significant patronage or commercial success. However, between 1837 and 1860 Francis exhibited one picture at the Royal Academy, one at the British Institution and six at the Suffolk Street Exhibition including the painting Autumn-Scotland-Evening, which received a favorable review in the Illustrated London News Supplement.

== The Deffett Francis Collection ==
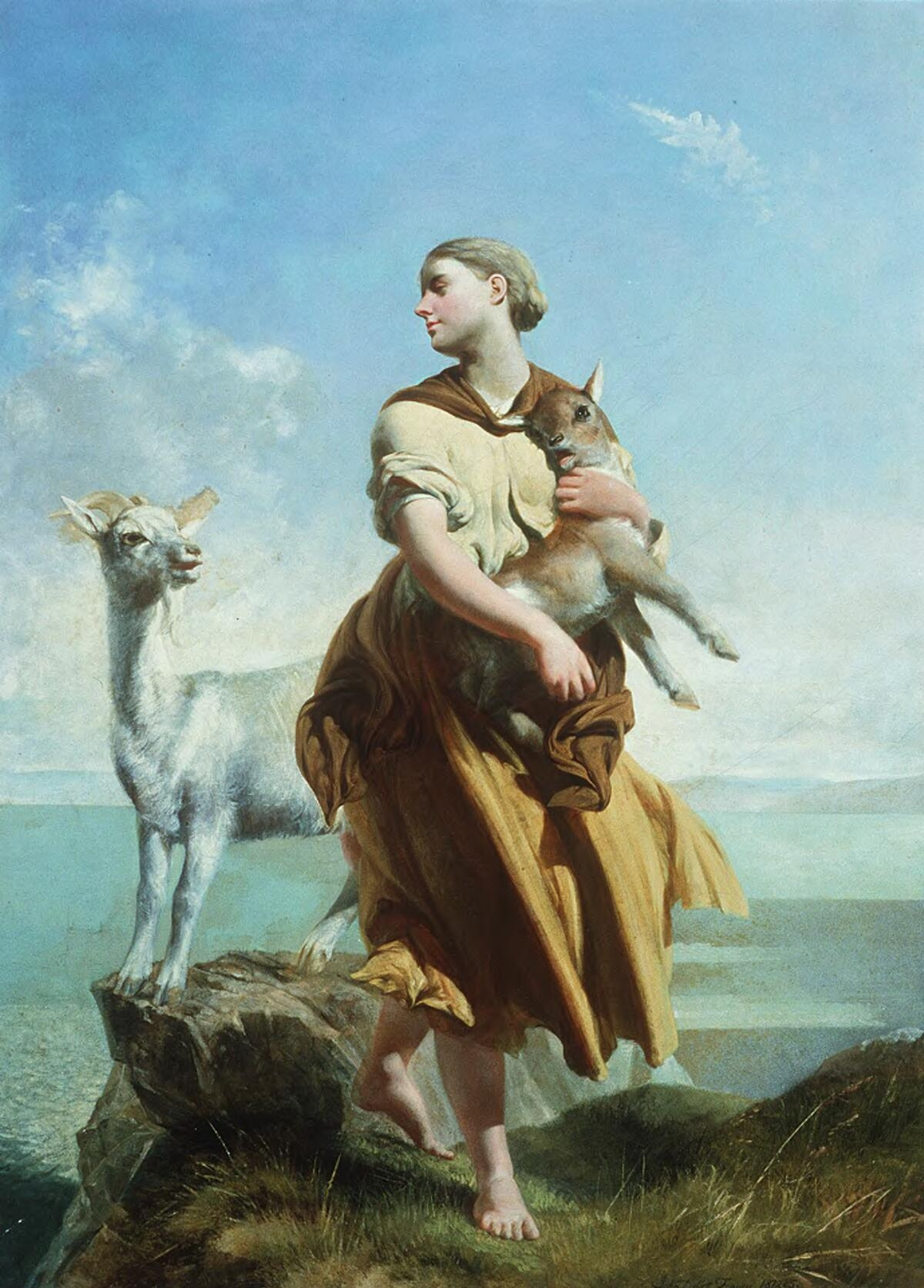
North Wales, an oil painting by John Deffett Francis at the National Library of Wales

Throughout his adult life, Francis was a devoted collector of rare books, prints and curiosities. This was also a family trait since his brother, George Grant Francis, was a successful antiquarian. In 1876, Francis made a generous bequest of his personal library, including art books, to the Swansea Public Library, while he was still alive. The Preface to a catalogue of the collection printed in 1887 introduces the donation in the following manner: 'In the year 1876, Mr. John Deffett Francis, desirous of promoting to the utmost of his power the study of Literature and Art in his native Town, determined to make a gift of his Library, consisting chiefly of Books on Art and subjects connected therewith, to his fellow townsmen.' In a subsequent catalogue statement dated 25 May 1887, the author of the Preface notes that:

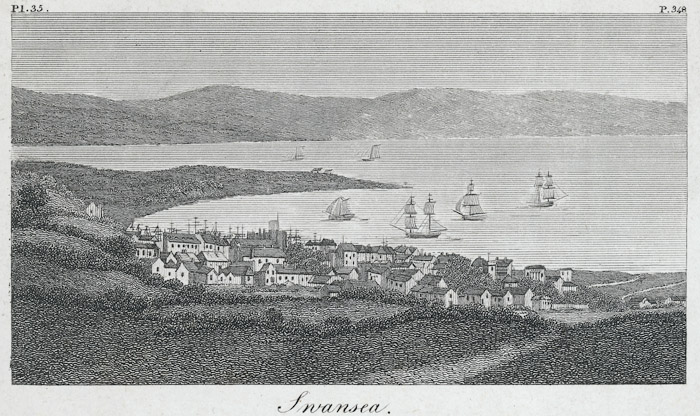
Artists Impression of Swansea, c. 1800.

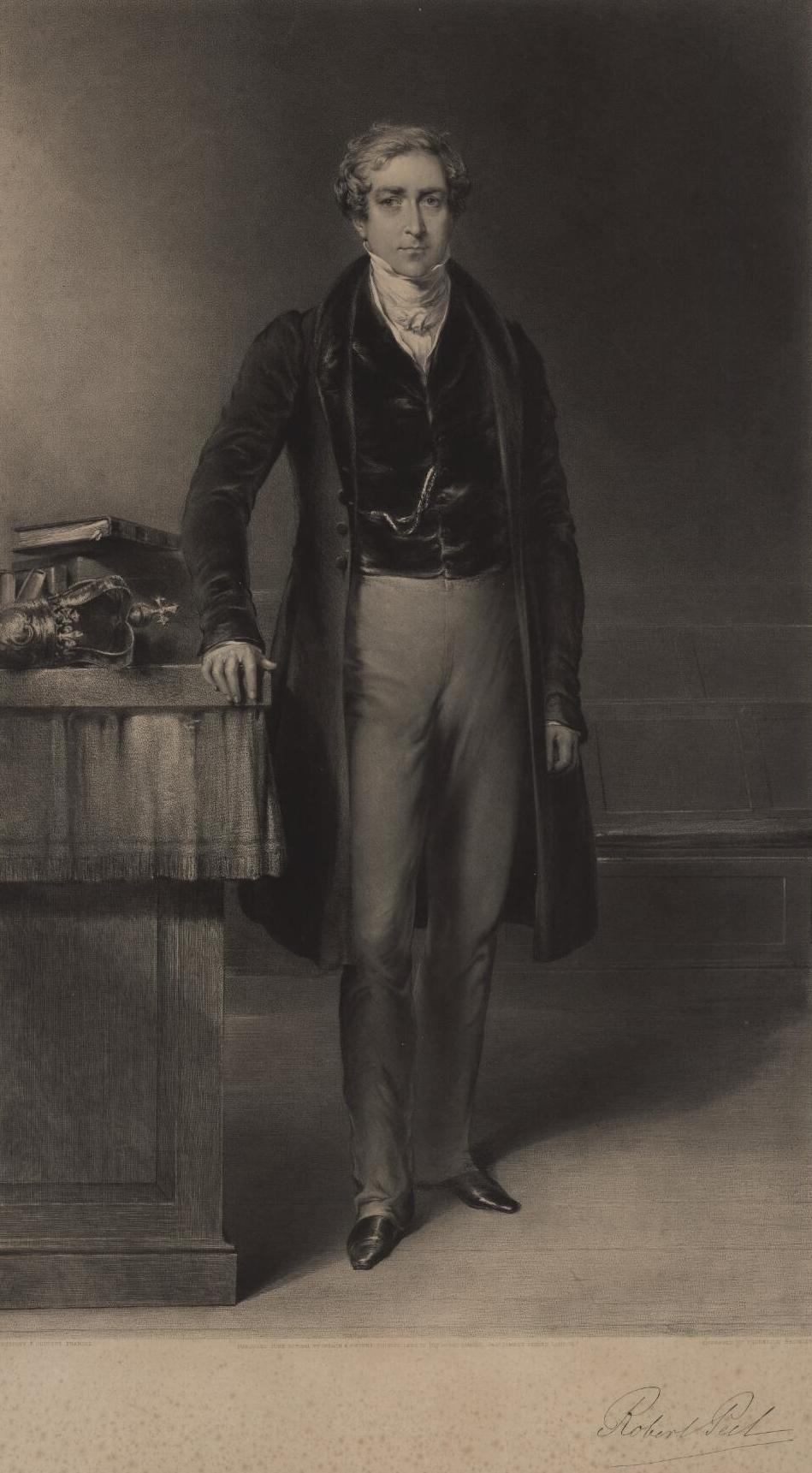
Portrait of Robert Peel by John Deffett Francis, 1841

The Library thus presented to the Burgesses consisted of between 600 and 700 volumes; but Mr. Francis was not satisfied to stop here. His object was the education of his fellow burgesses in Literature and Art, and in furtherance of that object he shortly afterwards gave a considerable collection of Drawings and Engravings, many of them of great rarity and beauty; and he determined to make the Library and collection of Pictures mutually illustrative.

Overall, the collection of artefacts that Francis collected and donated to Swansea Public Library between 1876 and his death in 1901 totalled 7,000 books and 2,000 pictures and engravings. Subsequently, Francis became a committee member of Swansea Library and curator of the fine arts. This substantial holding also led to the establishment of a 'D.F.' Art Gallery and Library, opened by William Gladstone in 1887. As a whole the library contains books on a huge variety of science and arts subjects including anatomy, free masonry, antique art and botany. It acts as a monument to the eclecticism of his tastes as well as his broad learning and erudition.

The John Deffett Francis collection was later transferred to the Glynn Vivian Art Gallery. Francis also bequeathed a collection of 20,000 prints, drawings and books to the British Museum.

== In verse ==
Surprisingly little is known about Francis' personal life. However, some insights are suggested by a satirical poem written by Wyndham Lawrence in 1876, which cites Francis and some of his contemporaries then living in Swansea. The satirical poem entitled 'Will of J.D. Francis Esq.' was printed in an edition of 110 copies and is dated 30 June 1876. As this is the same year that Francis made his generous donation of books to the Swansea Library, this may well be a playful response to this philanthropic incident, a reading that is supported by the poem itself, as the first-person narrator makes a series of joking 'bequests':

'I J. Deffett Francis, of Swansea Town,

Archaeologist, A-thiest and Artist,

Astronomer, Actor of some renown,

Curiosity, Critic and Chartist,

In the Name of Goodness Gracious! hereby

Make this my last Will and Testament.'

As a whole the poem supports a view of Francis as a dilettante with eclectic tastes. The poem also suggests that Francis suffered from poor health, was fond of women, ostentatious clothes, smoking pipes and often out of pocket. There is little information available about the author, Wyndham Lawrence, save what is included in the poem itself: 'he's a good, sanctimonious youth,/ And gazes on Gin with abhorrence'.

Francis died on 21 February 1901 at Bellevue Street, Swansea.
