= Swansea Museum =

Museum in Swansea, Wales

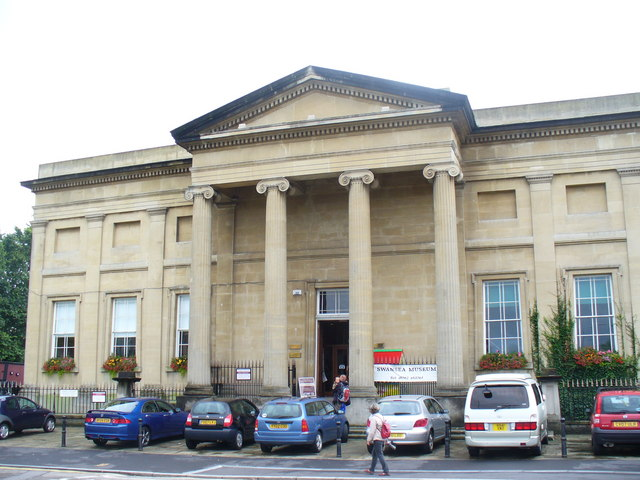

- Museum location in Swansea, Wales
- Location: Swansea, Wales
- Coordinates: 51.6178°N 3.9381°W
- Type: Local history, transportation
- Website: Swansea Museum

The Swansea Museum in Swansea, Wales, UK is the oldest museum in Wales, created for and by the Royal Institution of South Wales in 1841 to house its collections and provide research and learning facilities.

== History ==
Swansea Museum is the oldest museum in Wales. It opened in 1841, founded by the Royal Institution of South Wales (RISW), a group of art and science enthusiasts, six years after the organisation's establishment. The museum is housed in a Grade II* listed building that was commissioned by the RISW, built in the neo-classical style and completed in 1841. The building was designed to house the RISW's array of collections as well as provide research and learning facilities.

In 1990, guardianship of the Museum was transferred to City & County of Swansea.

Under threat of closure, the Swansea City Council saved the building and its collections in 1996. Swansea Museum now provides free access to six galleries with a variety of exhibits from an ancient mummy's tomb to temporary exhibitions on current issues and modern interests.

In 2015, the museum's future was uncertain, with a 50% budget cut announced in 2015. In 2016, the BBC4 television programme Britain's Lost Masterpieces uncovered a lost study for the Jacob Jordaens painting Meleager and Atalanta, at the museum, which was evaluated at more than £3 million.

In 2019, the Swansea Devil carving was donated to the Swansea museum by the owners of the Quadrant Shopping Centre.

In November 2026 Swansea Council announced plans to fix the museum’s leaking roof with funding from the Welsh Government

== Collections ==
The Museum operates four sites: the Landore Collections Centre, the Marina, the Tramshed on the Dylan Thomas Square and the Museum itself.

=== Landore Collections Centre ===
The Landore Collections Centre is located in the former rolling mills building of the former Hafod/Morfa Copperworks, parts of which date back to the 1830s. For most of its industrial life, it was used as a rolling mills, but was in use as a warehouse before the Local Authority acquired the site in 1980.

The building provides nearly 2,000 square metres (22,000 sq ft) of open-plan storage space for the reserve collections of both Swansea Museum and the former Maritime and Industrial Museum. Side rooms provide office and additional environmentally controlled storage space.

Plans to further develop and regenerate the surrounding area into a focus for Wales’ copper history will complement the Collections Centre as a heritage venue.

=== Marina ===
Access to the maritime section is available in June, July and August. The museum has a number of vessels in its collections:

- Lightship 91 Helwick
- Tug boat Canning
- 1909 Bristol Channel Pilot Cutter Olga

=== The Tramshed ===
The Tramshed in the Marina displays memorabilia from the former street trams of Swansea and the Mumbles tram that ran around the edge of the bay from Swansea town centre to Mumbles pier.

Originally part of the former Maritime and Industrial Museum, the Tramshed on the Dylan Thomas Square is now run by Swansea Museum. This conservatory-style gallery displays memorabilia from the street trams of Swansea, including the famous Mumbles train. Large windows illuminate a double-decker tram as well as a reconstruction of the original 1804 horse-drawn Mumbles train, the first passenger railway service in the world.
