= Mumbles lifeboat disaster =

Disaster at sea off South Wales

Coordinates: 51.50226°N 3.75045°W

The Mumbles lifeboat disaster occurred on 23 April 1947 off the coast of Sker Point, South Wales, when the Royal National Lifeboat Institution Mumbles lifeboat was overwhelmed by stormy seas as it attempted to rescue the crew of the steamship SS Samtampa. All eight members of the lifeboat crew died in the incident, alongside 39 members of the crew of the Samtampa.

== History ==
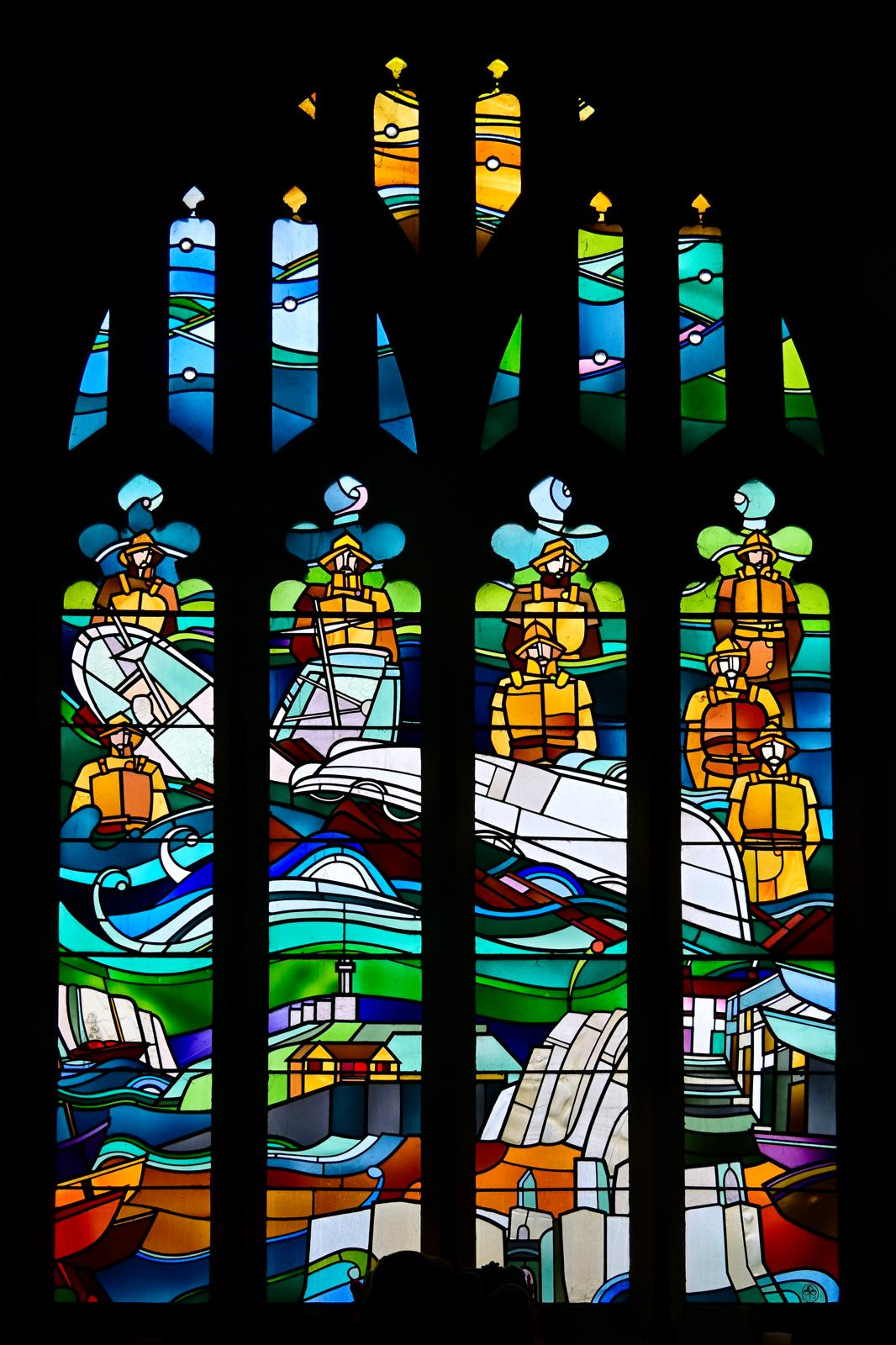
Mumbles lifeboat disaster memorial window - All Saints' Church Oystermouth (1977)

On night of the 23 April 1947 the SS Samtampa, en route from Middlesbrough to Newport, decided to weigh anchor at Sker Point on the Glamorgan coast not far from Porthcawl. However, due to gale-force winds, its three anchor cables were unable to hold the ship, which soon foundered on the rocks, breaking into three.

As the tragedy unfolded, a distress signal was received from the crew of the Samtampa as she battled the raging winds, prompting the lifeboat RNLB Edward, Prince of Wales (ON 678), with eight volunteer crew members onboard, to launch from Mumbles Lifeboat station, situated at the western end of Swansea Bay. After briefly returning to shore to receive the Samtampa's precise position, the lifeboat set out again but was soon lost from sight in the heavy seas and darkness. She was believed to have been overwhelmed by an exceptionally large breaking sea while attempting to work toward the Samtampa as she floundered in the surf off Sker Point.

By morning the lifeboat was found capsized on the rocks below the cliffs alongside the bodies of all eight lifeboatmen who had been aboard. The tragedy became one of the most devastating in the RNLI’s post-war history, highlighting the extreme hazards faced by volunteer lifeboat crews in storm conditions.

The eight lifeboatmen who lost their lives were:

- William John Gammon, coxswain, aged 46.
- William Noel, second coxswain, aged 42.
- William Gilbert Davies, first motor mechanic, aged 42.
- Ernest Griffin, assistant second motor mechanic, aged 51.
- William Richard Scourfield Thomas, bowman, aged 48.
- William Lewis Howell, boatman, aged 32.
- William Ronald Thomas, boatman, aged 34.
- Richard Smith, boatman, aged 35.

A further 39 members of the crew of the SS Samtampa also lost their lives.

All eight lifeboatmen were laid to rest in Oystermouth Cemetery on 29 April 1947, following a funeral service at All Saints' Church, Oystermouth, for seven of the men, and a requiem mass at the Roman Catholic Church of Our Lady Star of the Sea as short distance away for the second coxswain, William Noel. Shops throughout Mumbles were closed, and despite heavy rain, thousands gathered at the cemetery, in the churches, and along both sides of the two-mile route from All Saints' Church to the burial ground.

In 1977, on the occasion of the 30th anniversary of the disaster, a memorial stained glass window was unveiled in All Saints Church, where the funerals of seven of the crew had been held in 1947. The window was designed and manufactured by Tim Lewis, a significant figure of the Swansea School of stained glass. While recognisably figurative, Lewis design is vivid and rigorously modern. Unlike the majority of memorial commissions for churches, Lewis departed from the usual practice of using Christian iconography as an abstract allegory of loss. Instead, his design focused on the specific human element of the tragedy, depicting all eight volunteer lifeboatmen standing steadfast in the face of danger, the lifeboat station from which they sailed, and their upturned boat amid a turbulent seascape. In doing Lewis explicitly emphasised the courage and sacrifice of the eight men who lost their lives.

A memorial service was held in Swansea attended by the Duke of Kent on the 50th anniversary of the disaster.
