= All Saints' Church, Oystermouth =

Church in Oystermouth, Swansea, Wales

Coordinates: 51.5739°N 3.9976°W

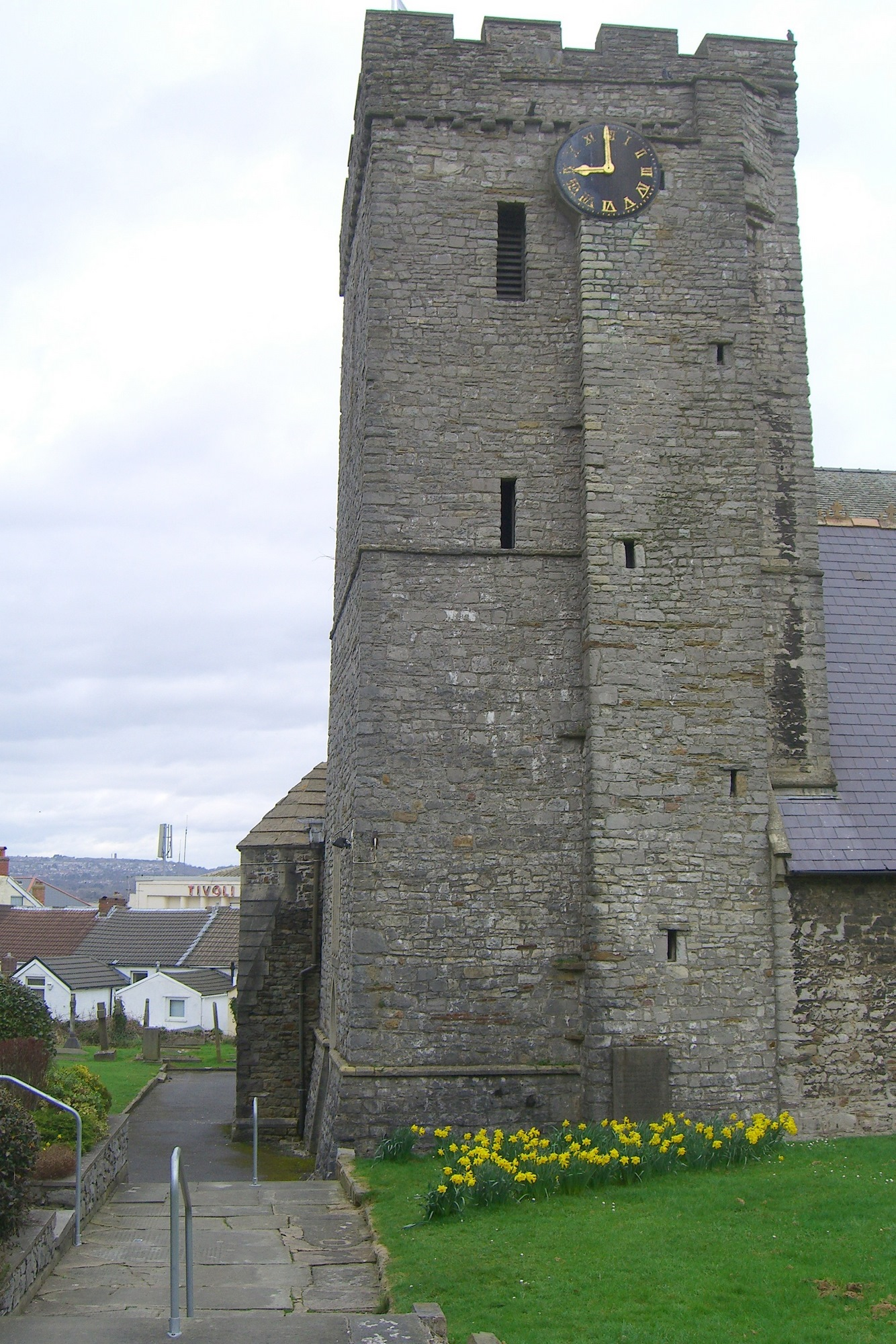
Tower of All Saints Church, Oystermouth

All Saints' Church, Oystermouth, is an Anglican church in the Diocese of Swansea and Brecon, South Wales. It is located in Mumbles and is a Grade II listed building (listed 23 April 1952 as "a large church with substantial medieval fabric and good interior detail, including early medieval piscina, font, and C20 glass") The church stands on a hillside, not far from Oystermouth Castle.

The building is estimated to have been built in the mid-12th century, having first been mentioned in writing in 1141. It originally consisted of a tower on its western side, a nave, and a lower chancel; the former nave is now the south aisle. A porch was constructed on the northern side in the 19th century, and in 1873 an organ chamber and vestry were built, to the design of Richard Kyrke Penson. The church was substantially reconstructed in 1915, adding a new nave and chancel and a north aisle. The former chancel became the Lady Chapel. Oak panels for the altar in the Lady Chapel were carved in 1937 by the Revd J. D. Davies.

The stained glass in the church includes a memorial window in the north aisle commemorating the Mumbles lifeboat disaster, installed to mark the 30th anniversary of the tragedy in 1977. It remembers the loss of all eight crew members of the lifeboat RNLB Edward, Prince of Wales while attempting to rescue the crew of the steamship Samtampa, which was wrecked during a gale on 23 April 1947. The window was designed and manufactured by Tim Lewis, a significant figure of the Swansea School of stained glass, who would later establish Glantawe Studios in Morriston. While recognisably figurative, Lewis design is vivid and rigorously modern. Unlike the majority of memorial commissions for churches, Lewis departed from the usual practice of using Christian iconography as an abstract allegory of loss. Instead, his design focused on the specific human element of the tragedy, depicting all eight lifeboatmen standing steadfast in the face of danger, the lifeboat station from which they sailed, and their upturned boat amid a turbulent seascape. In doing Lewis explicitly emphasised the courage and sacrifice of those who lost their lives.

Lewis undertook three more commissions for windows in the church, all made at Glantawe Studios. The next to be installed, in 1985, was Lewis's innovative and modern take on the Last Supper. Across two lights it depicts the table from above with only the hands of Jesus and the disciples shown. It can be found in the west end of the north aisle. Lewis's two-light window depicting the Adoration of the Senses was installed in the south aisle in 1986, using images of people, flora, fauna and water to represent each of the senses. Further along the same wall Lewis's three-light window based on the text of Dylan Thomas's poem Fern Hill was installed in 1993. It shows five figures in an allegorical landscape that alludes to episodes within the poem, the text of which is reproduced at the bottom of the window.

The most notable grave in the churchyard is that of the English doctor and editor Thomas Bowdler, who died in Swansea in 1825.

== Gallery ==
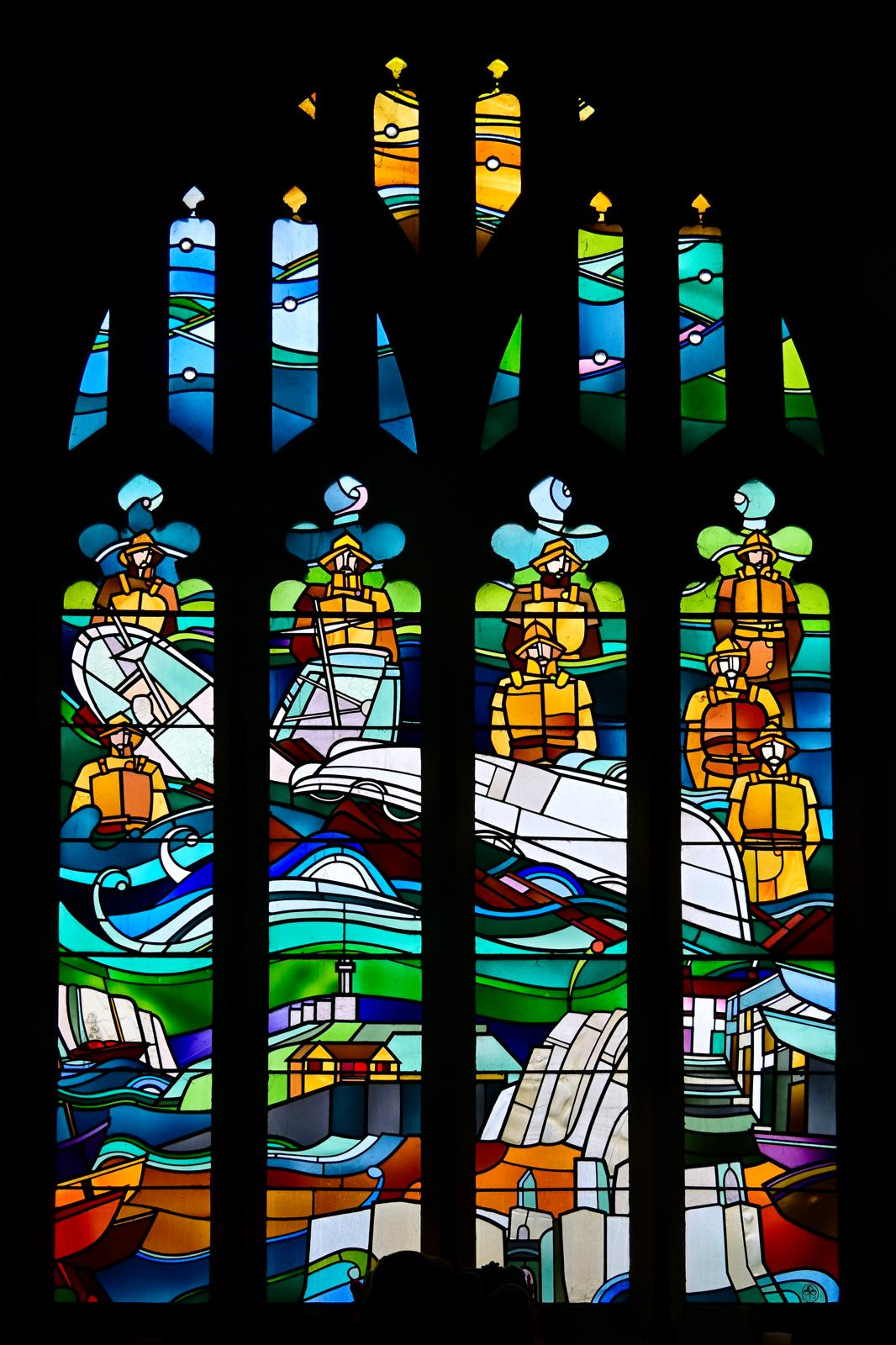
Mumbles lifeboat disaster memorial window (1977)

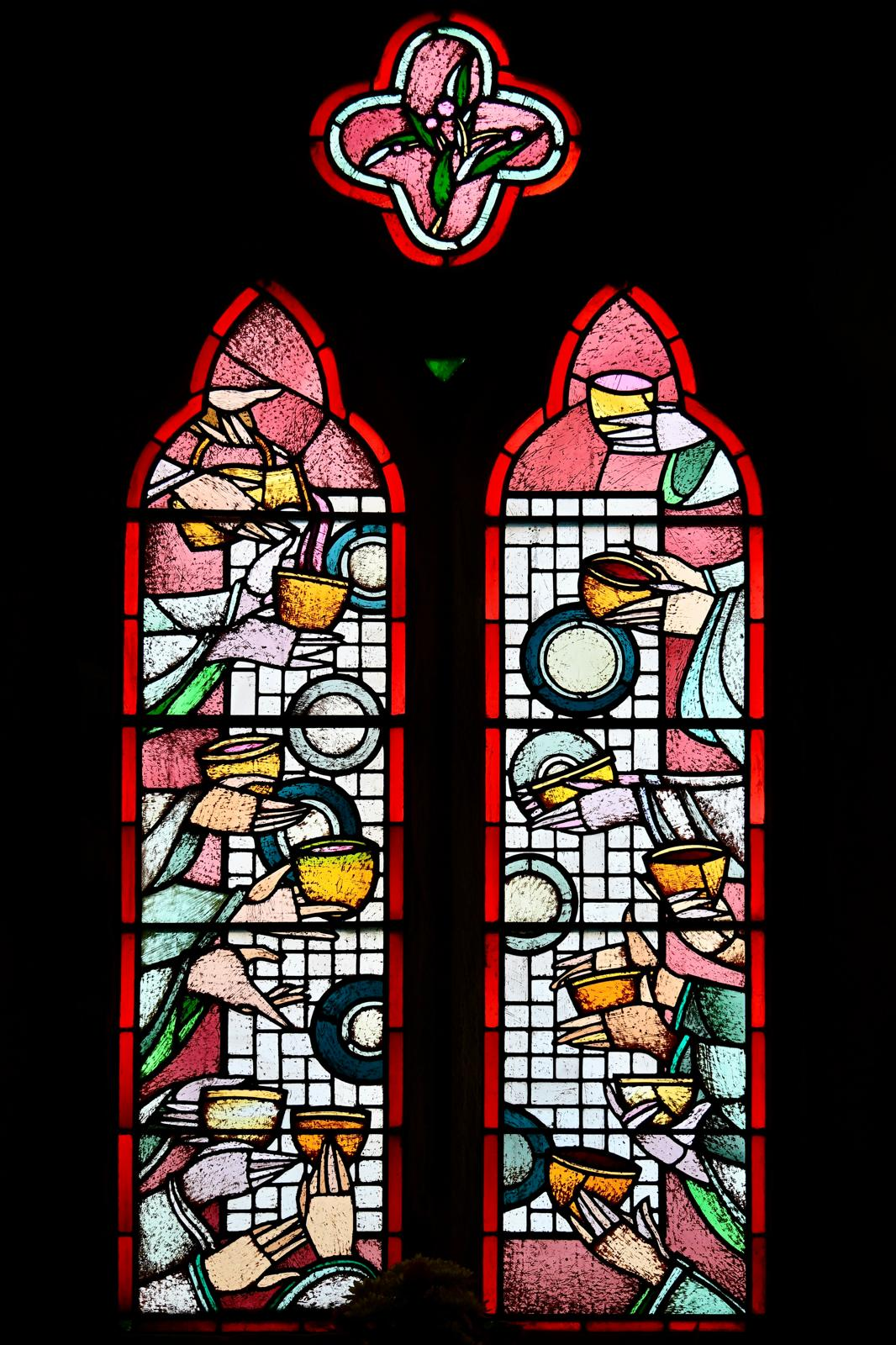
Last Supper window (1985)

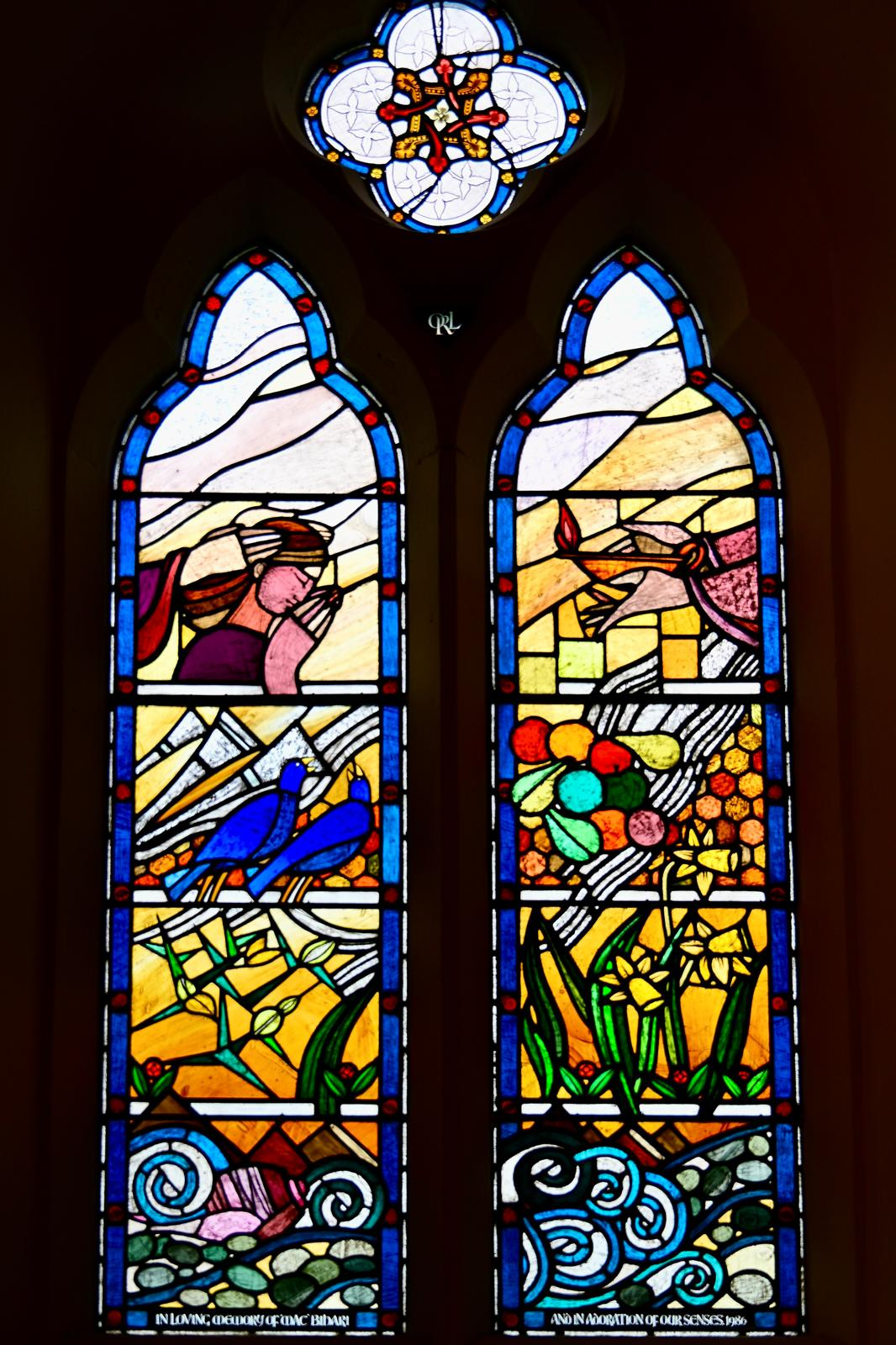
Adoration of the Senses window (1986)

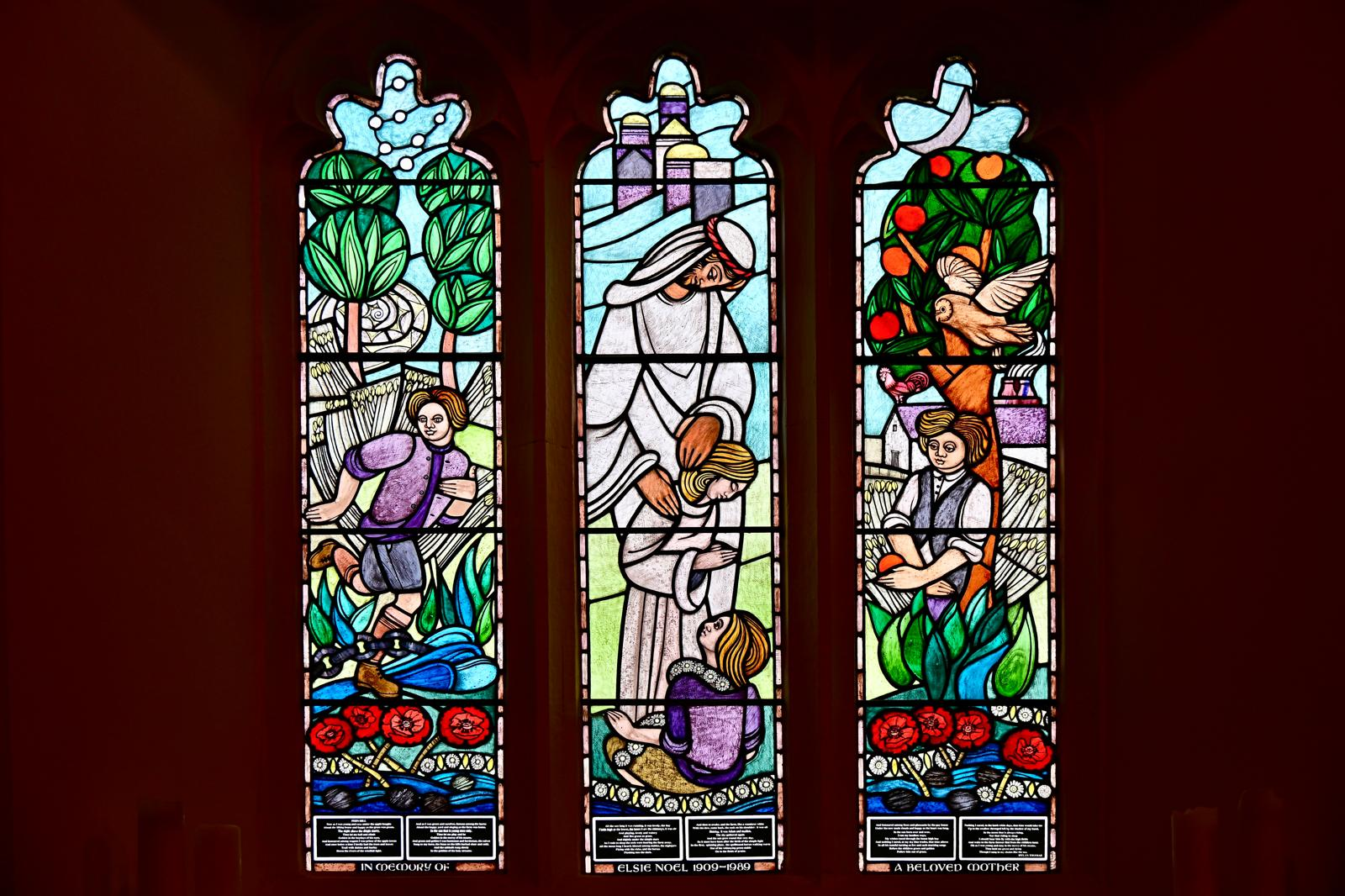
Fern Hill window (1993)
