= List of lifeboat disasters in Britain and Ireland =

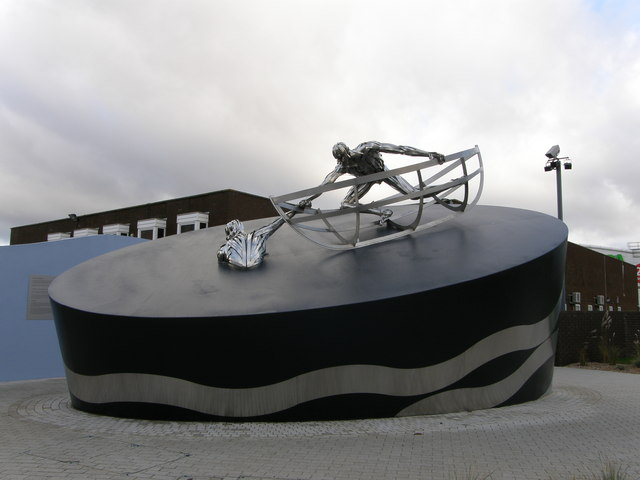
The RNLI Memorial at Poole

Many lives have been lost by lifeboat crews going to the aid of people and vessels in distress at sea and around the coasts of Great Britain, Ireland, the Channel Islands and the Isle of Man, mainly but not exclusively in the service of the Royal National Lifeboat Institution (RNLI). More than 600 names are inscribed on the RNLI Memorial at RNLI HQ, Poole. Some losses predate the RNLI (founded in 1824).

== 19th century ==
In the 19th century, lifeboats were almost exclusively oar and sail powered. Self-righting boats had been developed but were not yet widely adopted.

British Isles lifeboat disasters in the 19th century
Date	Lifeboat station	Lifeboat crew lost	Memorial	Brief details and references
1810	Hoylake	8		The men drowned when the lifeboat capsized in heavy seas while trying to aid the grounded ship Traveller.
1810	Blyth	15		The private lifeboat sponsored by Sir Matthew Ridley was wrecked on its first service to a number of Cullercoats fishing boats, caught in a sudden storm off St Mary's island in 1810. 15 lifeboat crew lost their lives.
1821	Sandycove	4		The men drowned while the lifeboat was assisting the brig Ellen of Liverpool.
1824	Great Yarmouth	5		On 23 November 1824 a boat was launched by eight Great Yarmouth beachmen in an attempt to rescue the crew of the stricken vessel Jessie. Whilst attempting to board the Jessie a heavy sea fell on board their boat which immediately sunk her and resulted in the loss of five of the crew.
1833	Appledore	3		Lifeboat 'Assistance' capsized on second approach to the brig Mary Ann. 3 men lost (Benjamin Pile, Samuel Blackmore and John Peake); 4 rescued from the sea by 2nd lifeboat 'Volunteer'. One man survived in the upturned boat, washed ashore an hour later.
1836	Scarborough	10		Lifeboat turned over by exceptional sea; four of the 14 crew survived.
1836	Redcar	1		Bowman William Guy was lost after being washed out of the lifeboat Zetland on service to the brig Caroline on 25 December.
1841	Whitby	4		Four lifeboat crew drowned when the 'East Side Lifeboat" capsized on service, 6 October 1841.
1841	Blyth	10		On 28 October 1841, the lifeboat went to the assistance of the brig Sibsons and was capsized; two of the 12 crew survived.
1845	Great Yarmouth	7		The yawl Phoenix was wrecked whilst going to the assistance of the collier brig Ann with the loss of seven of the fifteen people on board. Survivors were rescued by the Caister Lifeboat.
1847	Llanddwyn	1		Lifeboat capsized on service to the fully-rigged vessel Soane on 16 September, with the loss of crew member William Owen.
1849	Tynemouth	20		Lifeboat Providence of the Tyne Lifeboat Institution capsized on service to the brig Betsy on 4 December, with the loss of 20 of her 24 crew.
1857	Point of Air	13		The Liverpool Dock Trustees lifeboat capsized on 4 January, with the loss of all 13 crew.
1857	Margate	9		All crew lost off the lugger Victory on 5 January, when she capsized attempting to rescue the crew of the Northern Belle.
1859	Aldeburgh	3		Lifeboat capsized in December with the loss of three of her 15 crew.
1861	Scarborough	2		RNLI lifeboat Amelia wrecked on first service. Three members of the public who waded in also died, including Lord Charles Beauclerk.
1861	Whitby	12		Lifeboat capsized after several rescues during a storm. Only one crewman survived, Henry Freeman.
1864	Tynemouth	2		2 crew of the RNLI lifeboat Constance washed from the boat and lost, on service to the schooner Friendship and the steamship Stanley on 24 November.
1865	Holyhead	1		Crew member William Hughes drowned when the lifeboat capsized on service to the schooner Henry Holman of Plymouth on 14 January 1865.
1866	Gorleston	13		On 13 January 1866 the private lifeboat, Rescuer, capsized in a storm with the loss of 12 of her crew. A 13th fatality occurred when rescued crew member Robert Warner succumbed just days later as a direct result of the disaster.
1867	Gorleston	6		While returning to harbour after a rescue, a fishing lugger collided with the private lifeboat, Rescuer. She capsized and six of her crew and 19 other people drowned.
1867	Padstow	5		Lifeboat capsized during a service to the Georgiana. (Memorial on the wall of St. Petroc's church, Padstow)
1871	Bridlington	6		Fisherman's lifeboat Harbinger lost in the Great Gale of 1871.
1872	Tynemouth	2		2 crew of the Tyne Institution lifeboat Northumberland lost, on service to the brig Gleaner on 18 December.
1873	Skerries	6		Lifeboat Admiral Mitchell (1859) capsized on service to the schooner Sarah of Runcorn on 1 February.
1874	Stonehaven	4		Four of the crew of the lifeboat St George drowned while trying to enter Aberdeen Harbour after going to assist Grace Darling of Blyth, which foundered between Stonehaven and Aberdeen.
1875	Liverpool	3		Three members of the Liverpool lifeboat crew and nine crew and passengers from the Ellen Southard drowned after the lifeboat capsized.
1877	Berwick-upon-Tweed	1		Crew member Thomas Elliott suffered from exposure on service Result of Guernsey on 1 January 1877 and later died.
1877	Whitby	3		The Coxswain and two crew members drowned, when the lifeboat Harriett Forteath capsized, on service to the schooner Agenoria, 9 January 1877.
1877	Aberystwyth	1		John James, a member of the crew, died from exhaustion after a long service to a Schooner on 20 February.
1877	Bude	1		Coxswain James Maynard drowned when the lifeboat Elizabeth Moore Garden capsized, on service to the schooner Elizabeth Scown on 3–4 March.
1877	Dunbar	2		Two crew members were lost when the lifeboat Wallace capsized whilst on exercise on 13 October.
1880	Wells-next-the-Sea	11		Wells lifeboat disaster 11 of the 13 crew of RNLI lifeboat Eliza Adams were lost when she capsized after an abortive attempt to go to the aid of the brig Ocean Queen in heavy seas. The crew of the brig survived.
1881	Great Yarmouth	6		The lifeboat Abraham Thomas capsized on 18 January whilst attempting to rescue the mate of the schooner Guiding Star. The Abraham Thomas was struck by a heavy sea and lost six out of a crew of ten. The mate from the Guiding Star was also lost out of the lifeboat.
1881	Whitby	1		Second Coxswain James Pounder collapsed and died on 8 August whilst on lifeboat exercise.
1883	The Mumbles	4		The lifeboat Wolverhampton was lost on service to the barque Admiral Prinz Adalbert of Danzig on 27 January; the tragedy was the inspiration for Clement Scott's poem The Women of Mumbles Head.
1883	Rhosneigr	1		One man lost when the lifeboat Thomas Lingham capsized on service to the Norman Court of Greenock on 30 March 1883.
1885	Caister	8		The yawl Zephyr struck a sunken wreck on a distress call to a schooner on the Barber Sands. Eight of the 15 crew were lost.
1886	Southport	14		14 of the 16 crew of Southport's lifeboat Eliza Fernley, and the whole crew of St Anne's lifeboat (see below) died while trying to aid the barque Mexico in heavy seas. It remains the worst lifeboat loss in history. Main article: Southport and St Anne's lifeboats disaster
1886	St Annes	13		The crew of the St Anne's lifeboat Laura Janet, along with most of Southport's crew died in the same incident (see above). The crew of Mexico were rescued by Lytham's lifeboat. Main article: Southport and St Anne's lifeboats disaster
1888	Gorleston	4		The Refuge was a private lifeboat belonging to the Gorleston boatmen. After going to the assistance of the steamer Akaba the Refuge was being towed back to port when the tow-rope parted and she was driven onshore where she capsized with the loss of four of her seven crew.
1889	Portrush	3		Lifeboat The Robert and Agnes Blair (ON 158) went to the aid of the schooner Dryad and capsized off the coast off Portballintrae with the loss of three of the 13 crew.
1891	Hythe, Sandgate & Folkestone	1		Launched to the aid of the Benvenue, wrecked at Sandgate, Kent, RNLB Mayer de Rothschild (ON 35) capsized with the loss of one man. The boat and remaining crew were washed onto the beach, and after relaunching, rescued 27 lives.
1892	Holyhead	1		Coxswain Robert Jones died as a result of exposure and injuries, after falling on rocks, on service to the steamship Meath on 1 February 1892.
1895	Rhosneigr	1		William Roberts was run over by the lifeboat carriage during a launch on 28 December 1894, and died a few days later.
1895	Kingstown	15		Kingstown's (now Dún Laoghaire) lifeboat Civil Service No. 7 (ON 409) capsized while attempting to rescue the crew of the stricken Palme. All 15 crew died. Main article: Kingstown Lifeboat Disaster
1897	Margate	9		Nine of the 13 crew drowned when the private lifeboat Friend To All Nations capsized, on service to the ship Persian Empire of West Hartlepool.
1898	Blyth	1		On service to the Norwegian vessel Fremad on 16 October 1898, the No.2 Lifeboat Oswald, Sarah & Jane (ON 250) capsized. Second Coxswain Mark Fairhurst was pulled ashore, but he didn't survive.
1899	Aldeburgh	7		The lifeboat Aldeburgh (ON 304) capsized with the loss of seven of the 18 crew.

== 20th century ==
During the 20th century many advances were made in safety and durability of lifeboats, including self-righting and motor power. Life jackets were continuously being improved.

British Isles lifeboat disasters in the 20th century
Date	Lifeboat station	Lifeboat crew lost	Memorial	Brief details and references
1900	Padstow	8		RNLB James Stevens No. 4 (ON 421)
1901	Caister	9		RNLB Beauchamp (ON 327) capsized in heavy seas during the "Great Storm" of 1901. Asked why they had persisted in their rescue attempts the retired coxswain was reported as saying "Caister men never turn back". Main article: 1901 Caister lifeboat disaster
1901	Holyhead	2		Killed in a boiler room explosion aboard Steam-class lifeboat Duke of Northumberland (ON 231) on 26 June 1901
1903	The Mumbles	6		RNLB James Stevens No. 12 (ON 436) capsized while aiding the grounded Waterford steamer Christina near Port Talbot harbour.
1907	Ryde	2		On 1 January, the lifeboat Selina (ON 551) capsized in a squall while searching for a missing sailor, throwing the crew into the sea. The survivors were washed ashore with the lifeboat at Southsea.
1908	Newquay	1		RNLB James Stevens No 5 (ON 426) capsized.
1909	Cemlyn	1		Coxswain John Williams suffered exposure on service to the steamship Olive of Sligo on 6 September 1908, and died 11 months later, in August 1909.
1910	St Davids	3		RNLB Gem (ON 59) was wrecked on The Bitches in Ramsey Sound near Ramsey Island.
1914	Fethard	9		RNLB Helen Blake (ON 546) capsized and was totally wrecked on South Keeragh Island while going to the aid of the schooner Mexico.
1914	Peterhead	3		RNLB Alexander Tulloch (ON 622), attempting to assist grounded Hull trawler Tom Tit in a storm, was wrecked.
1915	Bridlington	1		During a launch to the aid of the minesweeping trawler Lord Airedale (HMT No. 847), the carriage carrying the lifeboat collapsed, resulting in the death by drowning of horse driver Robert Carr.
1915	Worthing	1		While going to the aid of the schooner Kingshill the lifeboat capsized in rough seas.
1916	Horton and Port Eynon	3		The lifeboat Janet (ON 559), responding to a distress signal from the S.S. Dunvegan, capsized twice in rough seas.
1916	Salcombe	13		RNLB William and Emma (ON 524) capsized while going to the aid of the schooner Western Lass, ashore beyond Prawle Point.
1919	Fraserburgh	2		RNLB Lady Rothes (ON 641) capsized while assisting H.M. Drifter Eminent.
1920	Holyhead	1		Crew member Thomas J. Michael killed when the vessel The Gardner Williams rolled on top of the lifeboat on 28 March
1920	Rhoscolyn	5		Five crew of the lifeboat Ramon Cabrera (ON 423) lost in the attempt to rescue the crew of the SS Timbo of Whitby in Caernarfon Bay on 3 December.
1920	Johnshaven	1		Three men were drowned when the Johnshaven lifeboat James Marsh (ON 639) capsized while returning to harbour after rescuing the nine-man crew of the Danish schooner Fredensborg in St Cyrus Bay. The lifeboat was overwhelmed by a heavy sea while attempting the difficult harbour entrance; two members of the Fredensborg crew and one lifeboatman were lost.
1921	Redcar	1		Shore helper Margaret Emmans died after being knocked down by the lifeboat carriage during launch on 21 January.
1921	Whitby	1		Shore Signalman James Harland slipped and died after being run over by the lifeboat carriage, during launch for demonstration on Whitby RNLI flag day, 16 August 1924.
1928	Rye Harbour	17		RNLB Mary Stanford (ON 661) capsized whilst coming into harbour after going to the aid of the Latvian steamer Alice of Riga.
1939	St Ives	7		RNLB John and Sara Eliza Styche (ON 743) capsized and self-righted three times, each time losing some of her crew. Only one crew member survived; the boat was wrecked.
1939	Cullercoats	6		RNLB Richard Silver Oliver (ON 794) was overwhelmed by a freak wave while training off Sharpness Point near Tynemouth Pier.
1940	Whitby	2		Two crewmen washed overboard from RNLB Mary Ann Hepworth and drowned, whilst on service to the Belgian vessel Charles, 3 February 1940.
1942	Newburgh	2		RNLB John Ryburn (ON 837) capsized returning home, after finding nobody aboard the SS Lesrix on 26 January, with the loss of two crew.
1947	The Mumbles	8		RNLB Edward, Prince of Wales (ON 678) capsized while trying to assist SS Samtampa which had run aground and broken up at Sker Point during a storm. A total of 47 lives were lost. Main article: The Mumbles Lifeboat disaster
1951	Scarborough	1		RNLB E.C.J.R. (ON 879). Whilst transferring from the casualty vessel to the lifeboat one crew member was trapped between the boats.
1952	Bridlington	1		RNLB Tillie Morrison, Sheffield (ON 851) capsized.
1953	Fraserburgh	6		RNLB John and Charles Kennedy (ON 790) capsized while escorting fishing vessels; one crew member survived.
1953	Arbroath	6		RNLB Robert Lindsay (ON 874) was sideswiped by a huge wave and flung on the rocks at Inchcape Park.
1954	Scarborough	3		RNLB E.C.J.R. (ON 879) capsized near the harbour mouth.
1955	Whitby	1		Former Coxswain David Harland died from head injuries received 17 years earlier, whilst launching the lifeboat.
1956	Exmouth	1		Lifeboatman Will Carder lost overboard during a service on Christmas Day.
1959	Broughty Ferry	8		RNLB Mona (ON 775) capsized with the loss of the whole crew while attempting to rescue the crew of the North Carr Lightship.
1962	Seaham	5		RNLB George Elmy (ON 873) capsized yards from the harbour entrance after being struck by a wave, with the loss of the whole crew and four of the five people they had rescued from the coble Economy.
1969	Longhope	8		RNLB T.G.B. (ON 962) capsized in storm force seas when going to the aid of the Irene.
1970	Fraserburgh	5		RNLB Duchess of Kent (ON 908) capsized after being struck by a wave more than 30-foot high, when assisting Danish fishing vessel Opal; one crew member survived.
1977	Kilmore Quay	1		Oakley-class lifeboat RNLB Lady Murphy (ON 997) launched to red flares but found nothing; on their return they capsized twice. 20-year-old Finton Sinnott was lost.
1981	Penlee	8		RNLB Solomon Browne (ON 954) was lost with all eight hands while assisting MV Union Star in a severe storm; the five crew and three passengers from Union Star also died. Main article: Penlee lifeboat disaster
1991	Caister (Ind.)	1		On 1 September 1991, Coxswain Roland 'Benny' Read died from injuries received whilst setting off a maroon, which exploded in his hand.

== See also ==
- Royal National Lifeboat Institution
- List of RNLI stations
- List of former RNLI stations
- Independent lifeboats in Britain and Ireland
