= Anne Francis (disambiguation) =

Anne Francis (1930–2011) was an American actress.

Anne Francis or Anne Francis may also refer to:

- Anne Francis (author) (1738–1800), English scholar and poet
- Ann Francis, ship wrecked off the coast of Wales in 1583
