= Tim Lewis (disambiguation) =

Tim Lewis (born 1961) is an American football coach and former player.

Tim or Timothy Lewis may also refer to:

- Tim Lewis (racewalker) (born 1962), American Olympic athlete
- Tim Lewis (basketball) (born 1967), British basketball coach
- Tim Lewis (politician), American politician in the New Mexico House of Representatives
- Tim Lewis (tennis) (1925–2017), British tennis player
- Tim Lewis (artist) (1940-2025), Welsh stained glass artist
- Thighpaulsandra (Tim Lewis), Welsh experimental musician
- Timothy K. Lewis (born 1954), American federal judge
- Timothy Richards Lewis (1841–1886), Welsh surgeon and pathologist
