= Tim Lewis (artist) =

Welsh stained glass artist (1940-2025)

- Born: Timothy Lewis; 1940; Pontarddulais, West Glamorgan
- Died: 14 January 2025 (aged 84–85); Swansea
- Education: Royal College of Art, London
- Known for: Stained glass
- Notable work: Mumbles lifeboat disaster memorial window, All Saints' Church, Oystermouth
- Movement: Swansea school

Tim Lewis (1940 - 2025) was a Welsh stained glass artist and educator associated with the modern stained glass movement centred on Swansea in the later 20th century. He founded Glantawe Studios in Morriston, a workshop that produced architectural stained glass for churches and public buildings in Wales and across the United Kingdom.

== Early life and education ==
Timothy 'Tim' Lewis was born in Pontarddulais, West Glamorgan in 1940. At school in Swansea he studied art before accepting a place at the Royal College of Art in London to study stained glass design, where he studied under Lawrence Lee, a major figure in the post-war revival of modern architectural stained glass in the UK. After completing his studies in 1963, Lewis returned to Wales and soon became associated with the emerging stained glass tradition centred on Swansea.

== Swansea School of Art ==
Lewis joined the staff of Swansea College of Art in 1963, where he taught architectural stained glass, being promoted to lead the department in 1972 after the retirement of Howard Martin. During Lewis’s tenure, the course he led at Swansea School of Art was successful at attracting students from Britain and abroad. Lewis also maintained educational links with modern stained glass movements across Europe. Visiting artists included German designers Ludwig Schaffrath and Johannes Schreiter, whose work was reflected in the development of the Swansea style under Lewis, advancing a tradition that had developed in the mid-20th century through Swansea-based Celtic Studios.

Alongside his teaching work, Lewis also accepted private architectural stained glass commissions. Throughout the 1970s he designed and manufactured his windows using the facilities available to him at Swansea School of Art. In doing so he would frequently involve his students in this process, fostering a collaborative 'teaching studio' environment. In particular, Lewis was a proponent of the appliqué method, a process which involves using glue to fuse pieces of glass on top of each other, requiring less leading overall. Lewis chose an image of a stylised shamrock as his maker's mark, usually positioned at the bottom of a window alongside his name and the year of manufacture.

=== Mumbles lifeboat disaster memorial window ===
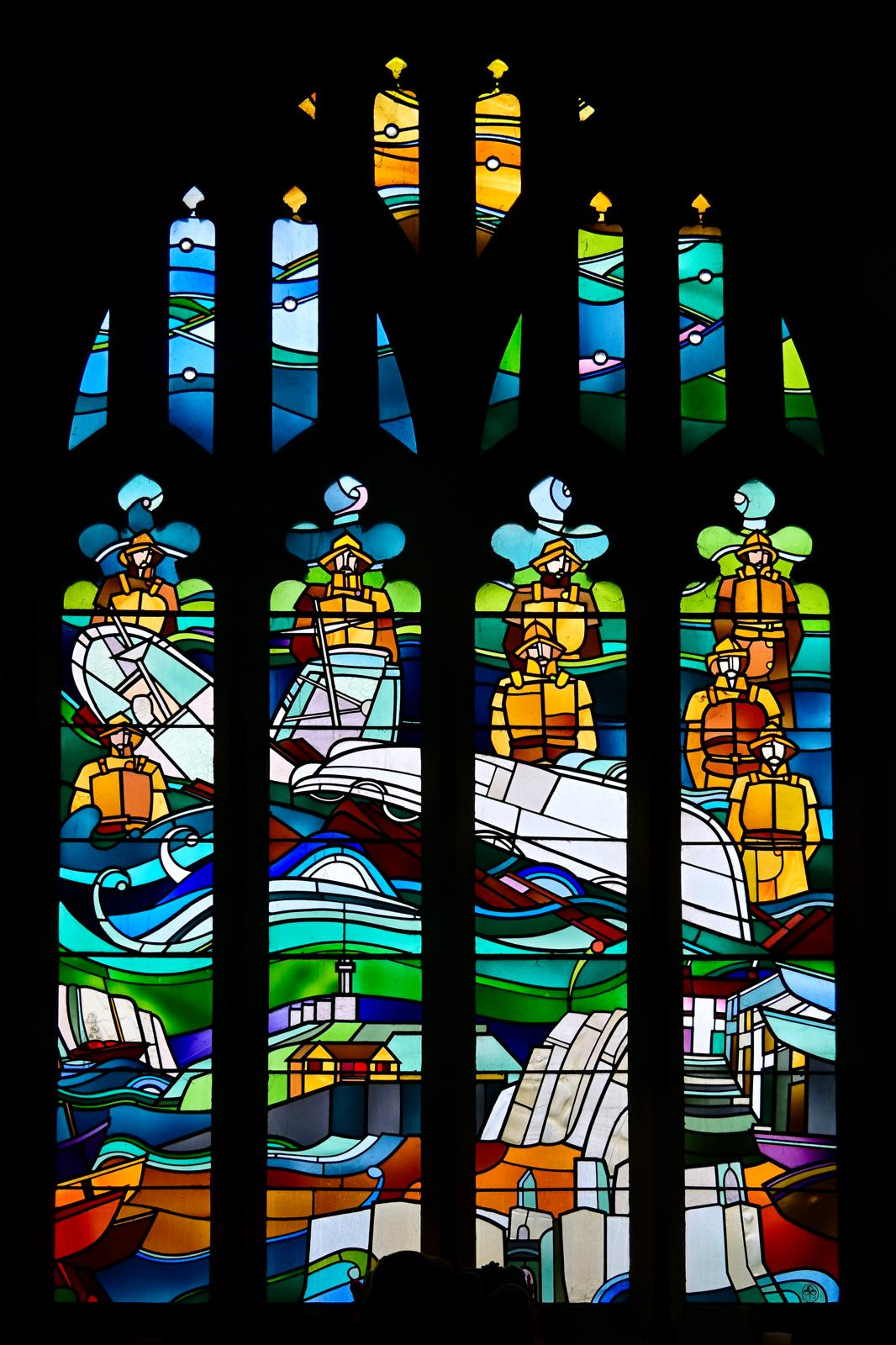
Mumbles lifeboat disaster memorial window - All Saints' Church Oystermouth (1977)

Among Lewis's early works is the window commemorating the 1947 Mumbles lifeboat disaster, which was installed in the north aisle of All Saints’ Church in Oystermouth in 1977. It was commissioned to commemorate the 30th anniversary of the loss of all eight crew members of the lifeboat RNLB Edward, Prince of Wales while attempting to rescue the crew of the steamship Samtampa, which was wrecked during a gale on 23 April 1947. Unlike the majority of memorial commissions for churches, Lewis departed from the usual practice of using Christian iconography as an abstract allegory of loss. Instead, his design focused on the specific human element of the tragedy, depicting all eight lifeboatmen standing steadfast in the face of danger, the lifeboat station from which they sailed, and their upturned boat amid a turbulent seascape. In doing so, Lewis placed the narrative emphasis directly on the courage and sacrifice of those who lost their lives. To inform his design for the window Lewis went out with a lifeboat crew and took part in an exercise. While recognisably figurative, Lewis's vivid modern design contributed to the development of the Swansea stained-glass style in the last two decades of the 20th century.

== Glantawe Studios ==
By the early 1980s, the number of commercial commissions being accepted by Lewis had exceeded the capacity of his original studio setup. To accommodate this, Lewis established Glantawe Studios, a dedicated stained glass workshop based in Morriston. At the same time Lewis maintained his academic position at the Swansea School of Art and continued to teach until his retirement in 1995. Lewis's new studio would serve as a training environment for younger stained-glass artists where they could gain early professional experience, several of whom had previously studied under Lewis.

Over the next three decades Glantawe Studio would complete dozens of stained glass commissions for churches, public buildings and private customers. Most of the works produced by Glantawe Studios were for churches in South Wales, though examples can be found in churches elsewhere across the UK and in non-religious settings. Lewis continued the tradition of using a shamrock as the studio mark, normally with the name of Glantawe Studios shown alongside the name or initials of the designer.

=== All Saints' Church, Rhiwbina ===
The Church of All Saints in Rhiwbina, Cardiff, serves as one of the most significant galleries of Lewis's work at Glantawe Studios. A 1930s construction, the church provided a blank canvas for his modern, architectural style. First to be installed was the east window in 1985, depicting a collection of traditional Christian symbols across five lights, including a chalice, the Alpha and Omega, a wheatsheaf, hands in prayer and the Easter lily. Each is characterised by high-contrast colours and a stylised use of leading that simplifies and reduces the visual elements in a modern manner. Following this, Lewis was commissioned to glaze the corresponding west window, which was installed around 1991. Stylistically consistent with his earlier work for the church, within each light is shown one of the four symbols of the Evangelists above the symbol of the saints David, Peter, Paul, and Francis, each apparently emerging from a swirling background of blues and grays. Lewis also provided two smaller single-lancet windows for the church around 1992. Installed in the west wall, either side of the central window, the first depicts the Burning Bush and Noah's Ark, the second shows the miracles of the Wedding at Cana and Feeding the multitude.

=== Return to All Saints' Church, Oystermouth ===
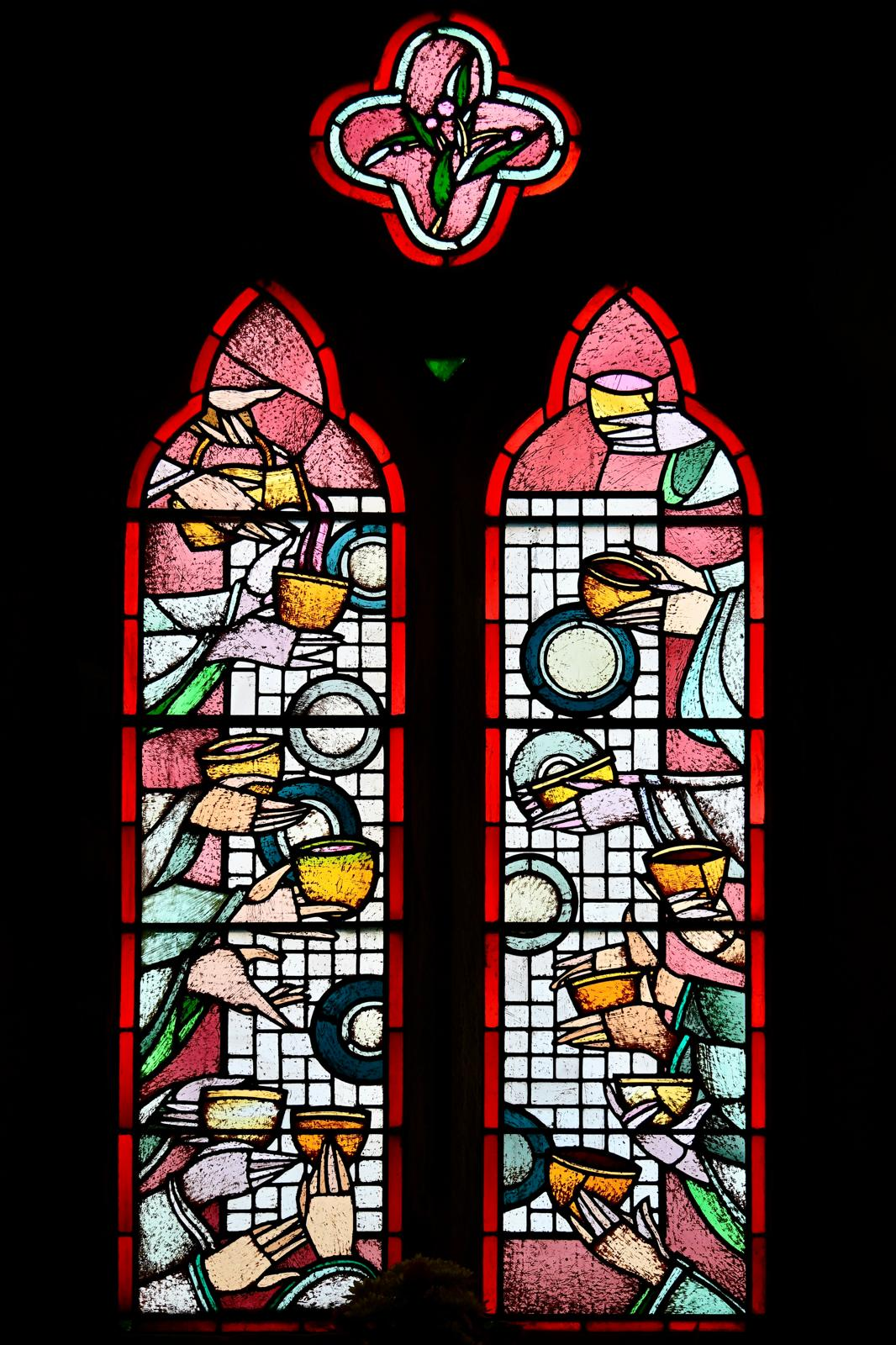
Last Supper window - All Saints' Church Oystermouth (1985)

Lewis would also complete three more commissions for the church of All Saints in Oystermouth, complementing his lifeboat memorial window of 1977. The first to be installed, in 1985, was Lewis's novel take on the Last Supper. Across two lights it depicts the table from above with only the hands of Jesus and the disciples shown. It can be found in the west end of the north aisle. Lewis's two-light window depicting the Adoration of the Senses was installed in the south aisle in 1986, using images of people, flora, fauna and water to represent each of the senses. Further along the same wall Lewis's three-light window based on the text of Dylan Thomas's 1945 poem Fern Hill was installed in 1993. It shows five figures in an allegorical landscape that alludes to episodes within the poem, the text of which is reproduced at the bottom of the window.

=== Other artists at Glantawe Studios ===
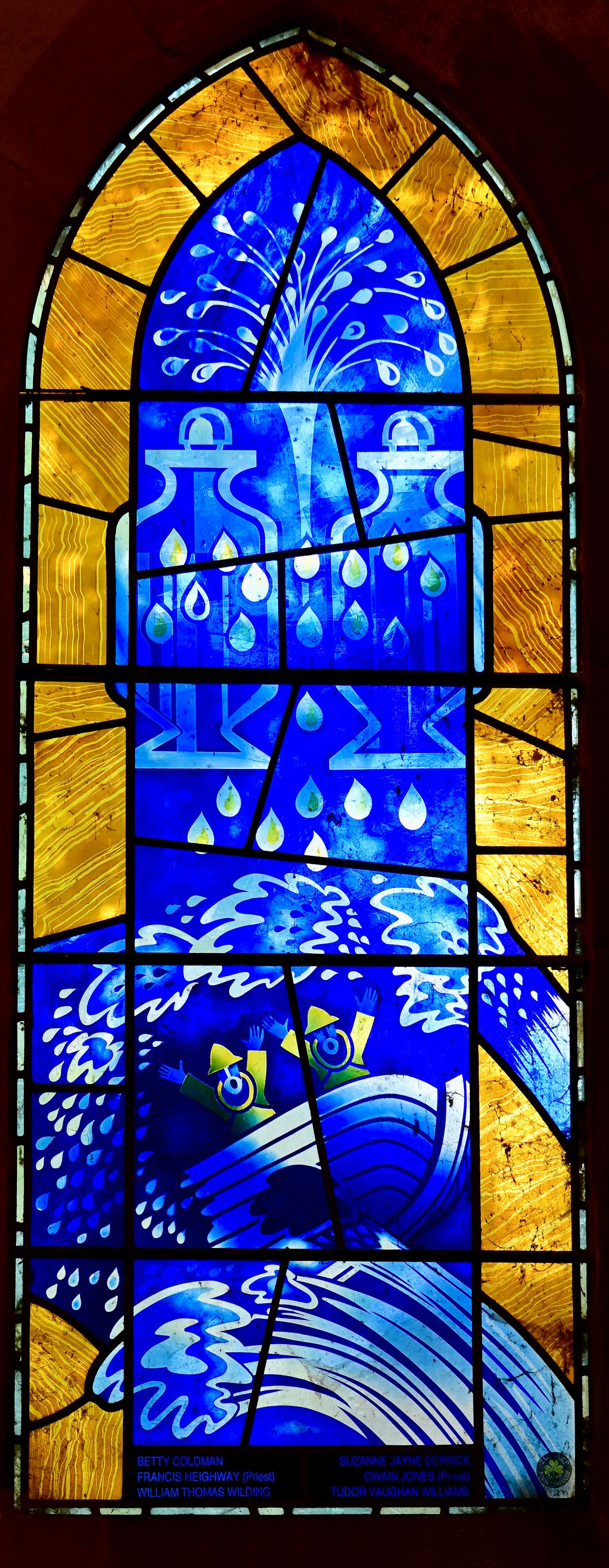
Children's' window (right light) - Swansea Minster, John Edwards for Glantawe Studios (1999)

While the majority of commissions realised by Glantawe Studios were made to Lewis's own designs, his desire for the studio to serve as a training environment for younger stained-glass artists allowed many young artists, most of whom had studied under Lewis, to gain their first professional experience in the field. Notably, many of the works of John Edwards, Colwyn Morris and Bryan Tobais Evans were made at Glantawe.

Swansea Minster is notable for its extensive collection of modern glass, including a number produced at Glantawe Studios. Having been extensively damaged during the Swansea Blitz, the post-war restoration included the commissioning of a number of windows, installed piecemeal over the following decades. Among these are three windows from Glantawe Studios; Kuni Kajiwara's 1981 two-light Butterfly window in the north nave aisle, Colwyn Morris's 1994 St Valentine and St Cecilia windows in the north chancel, and John Edwards' 1999 children's window in the west wall of the north aisle.

Glantawe Studios closed when Lewis retired in the early 2010s, though he had already begun scaling back his day-to-day involvement in commissions following his retirement from academia in 1995. Lewis died on the 14 January 2025.

== Gallery ==
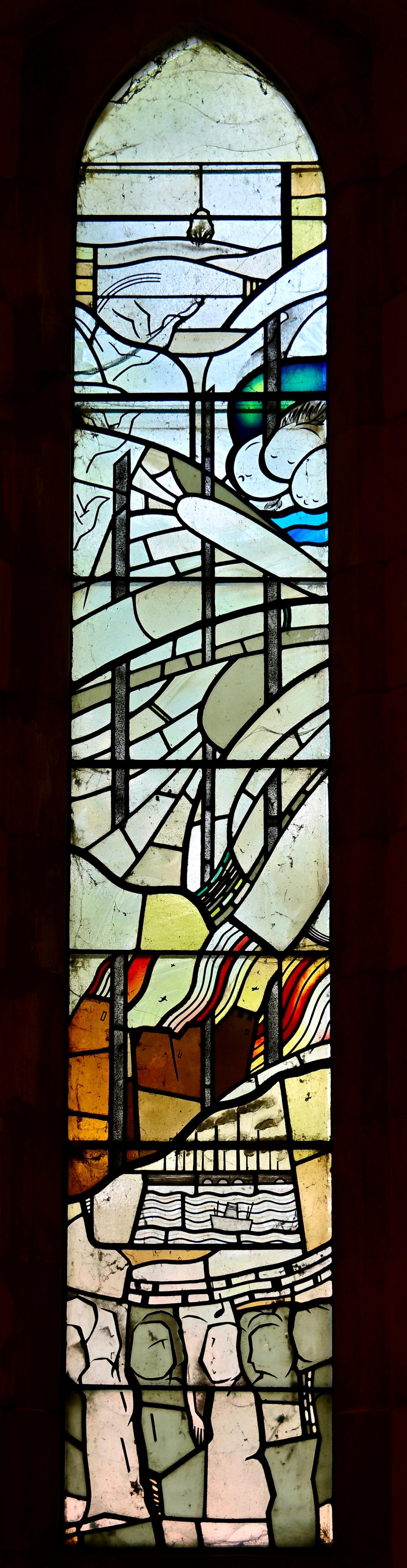
Butterfly window (left light), Swansea Minster - Kuni Kajiwara for Glantawe Studios (1981)

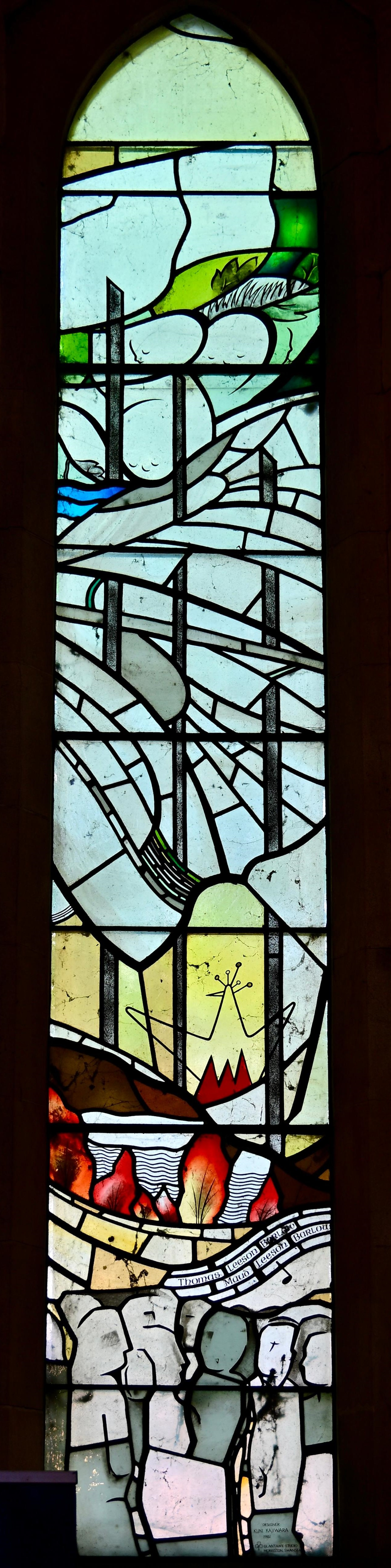
Butterfly window (right light), Swansea Minster - Kuni Kajiwara for Glantawe Studios (1981)

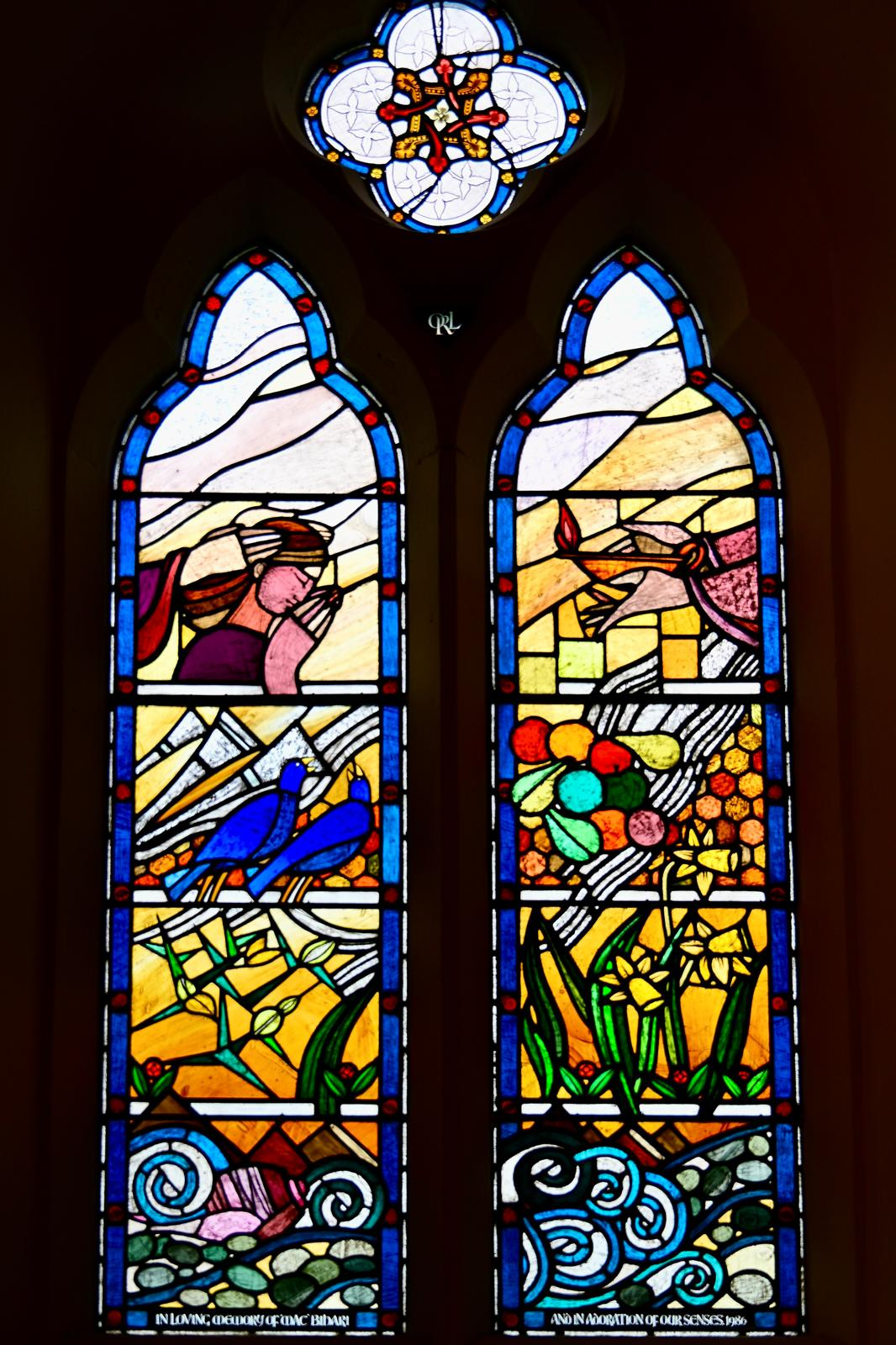
Adoration of the Senses window, All Saints' Church Oystermouth - Tim Lewis for Glantawe Studios (1986)

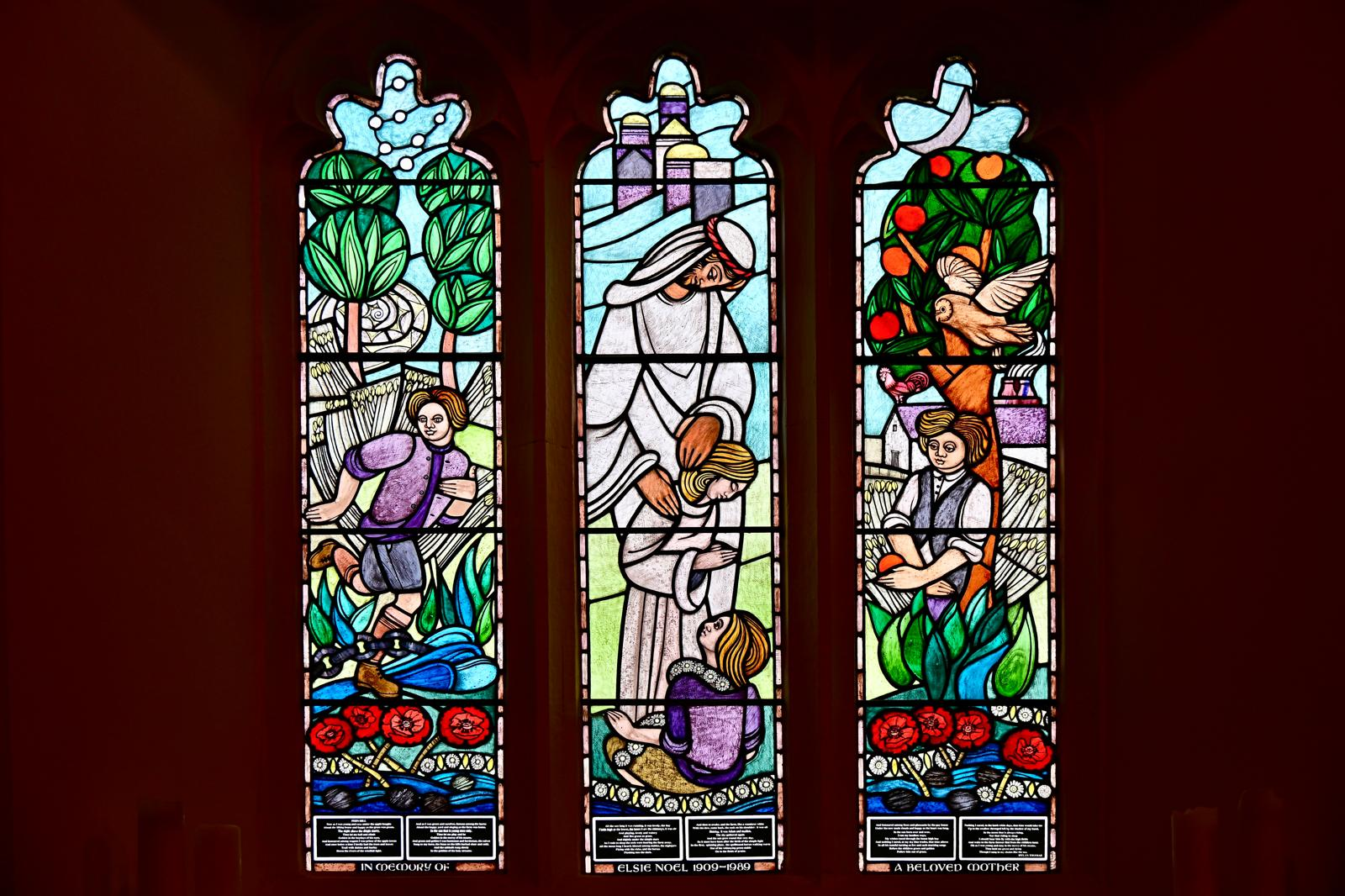
Fern Hill window, All Saints' Church Oystermouth - Tim Lewis for Glantawe Studios (1993)

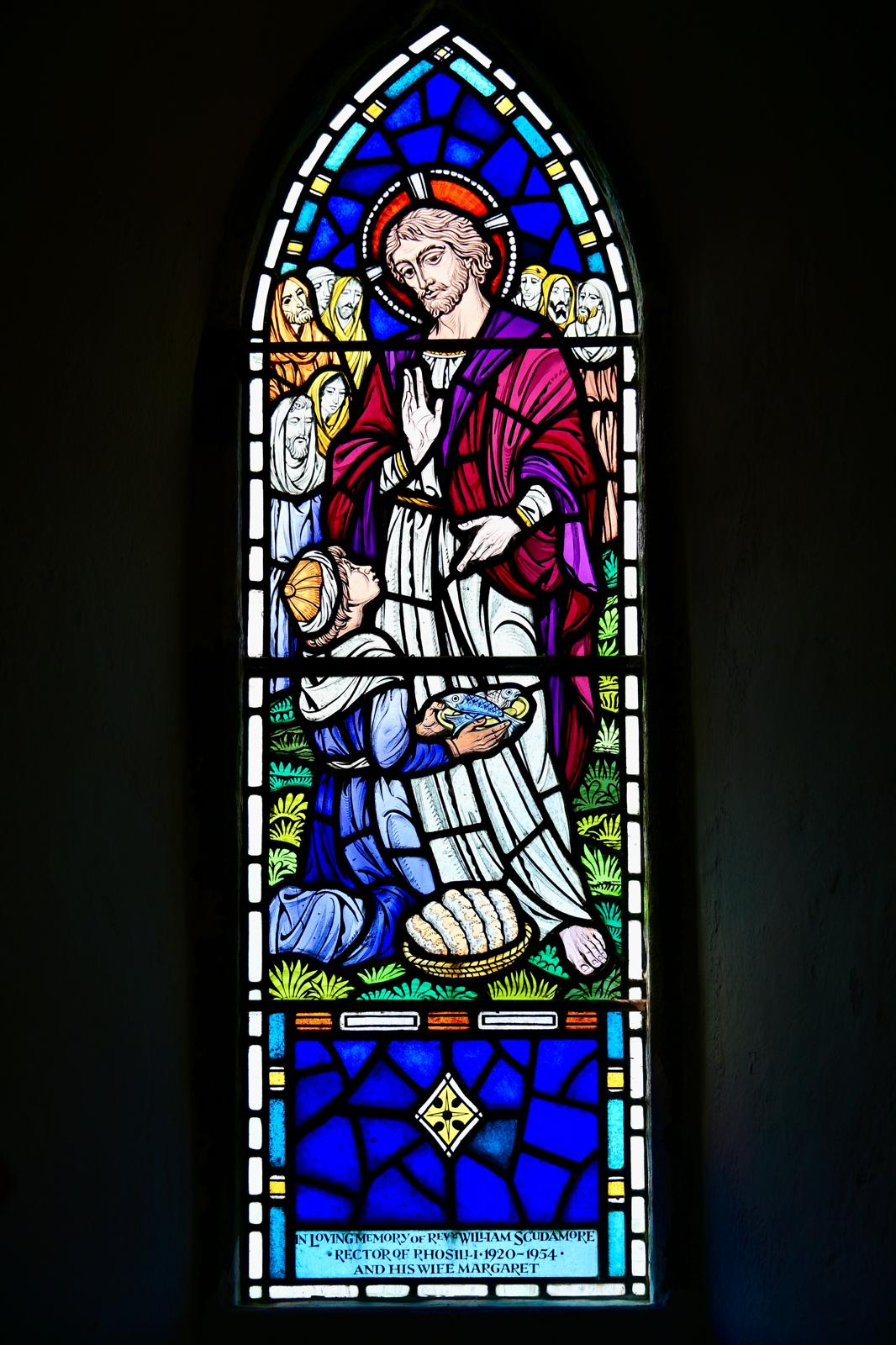
Christ Blessing the Bread and Fish Brought by a Boy, St Mary's Church, Rhossili, Swansea - Colwyn Morris for Glantawe Studios (1997)

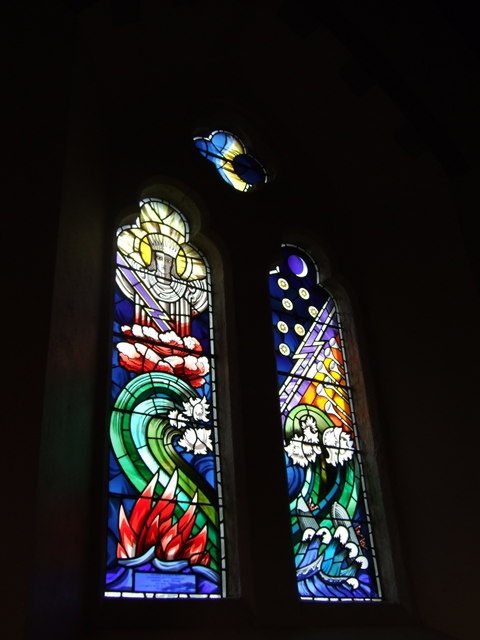
Second Coming window, St Peter's Church, Little Newcastle, John Edwards for Glantawe Studios (2001)

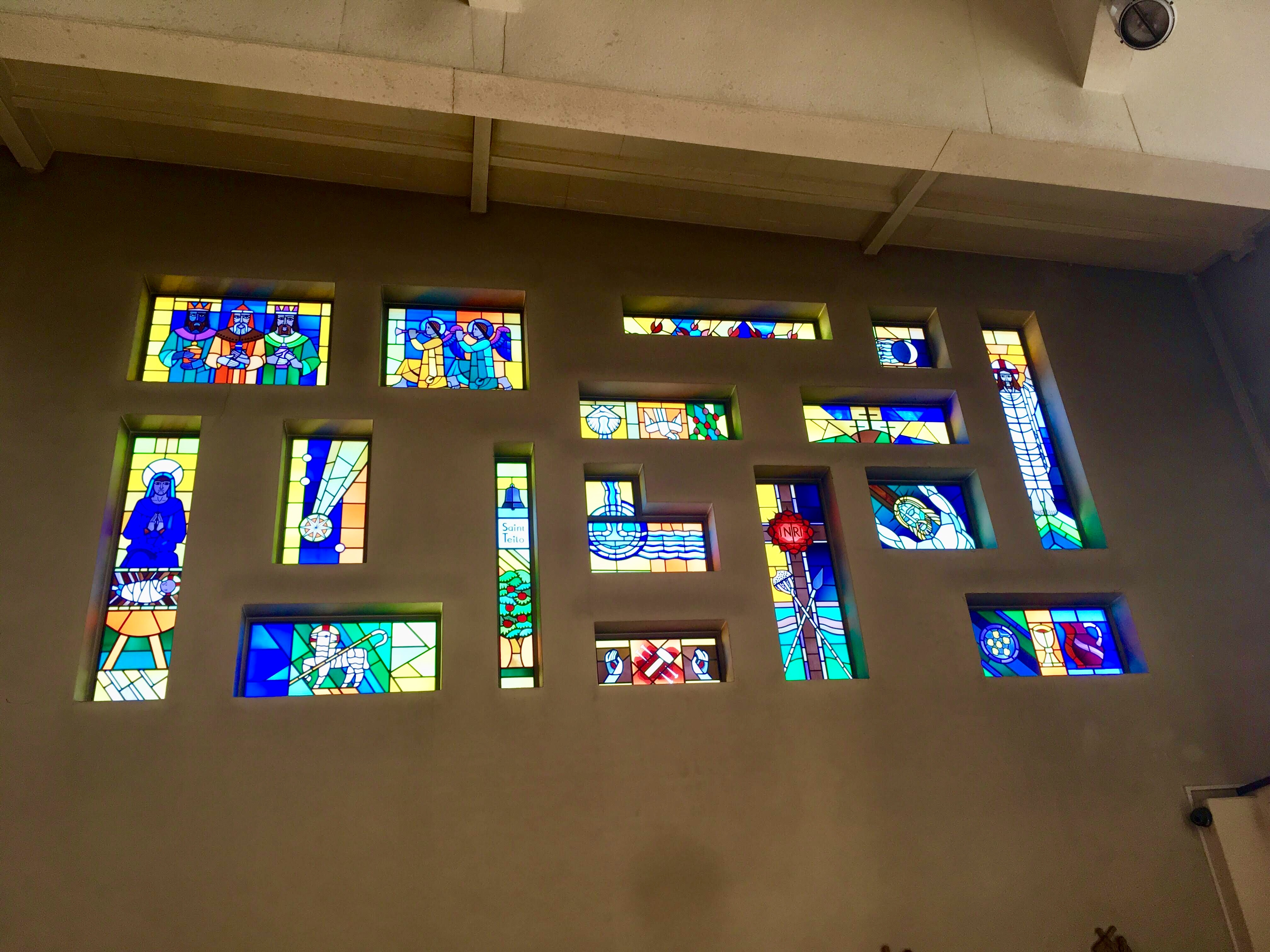
16 Biblical scenes and symbols, St Teilo's Church, Whitchurch, Cardiff - John Edwards for Glantawe Studios (2004)

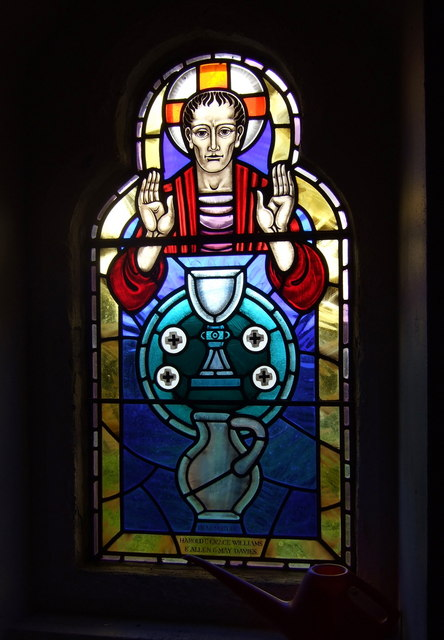
Last Supper window, St Peter's Church, Little Newcastle - John Edwards for Glantawe Studios (2005)
