= Mumbles =

Headland on Swansea Bay in Wales

Coordinates: 51.568°N 3.985°W

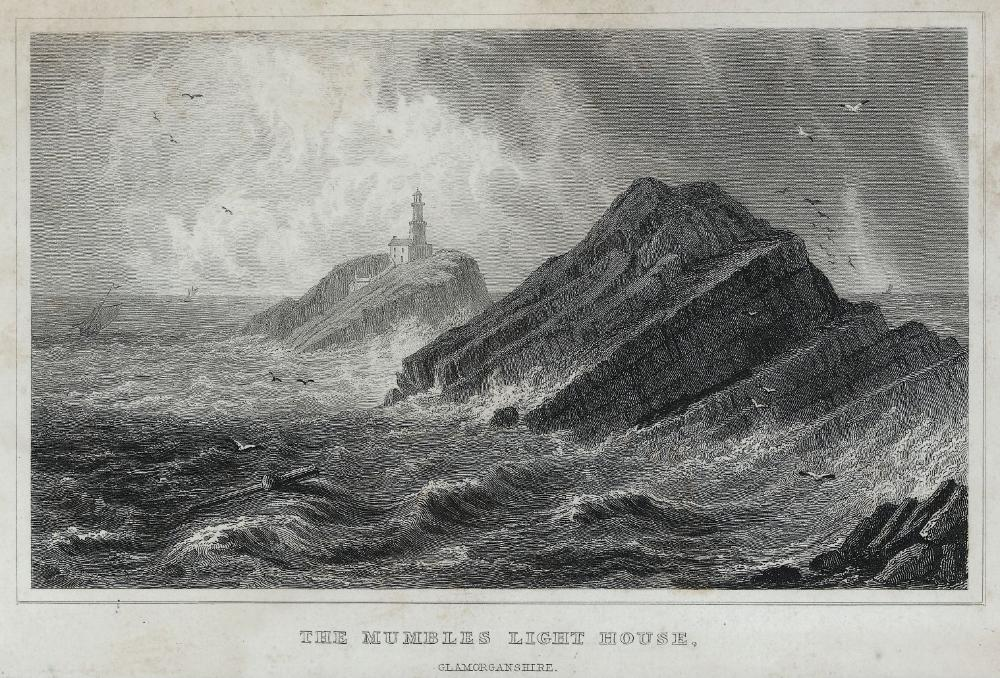
Mumbles and lighthouse, mid-1800s

Mumbles (Welsh: Mwmbwls) is a headland sited on the western edge of Swansea Bay on the southern coast of Wales.

== Toponym ==
Mumbles has been noted for its unusual place name. The headland is thought by some to have been named by French sailors, after the shape of the two anthropomorphic islands which the headland comprises: the word "Mumbles" may be a corruption of the French les mamelles, meaning "the breasts". Another possible source of the name is the word Mamucium, which is generally thought to represent a Latinisation of an original Brythonic name, either from mamm- ("breast", in reference to a "breast-like hill") or from mamma ("mother", in reference to a local river goddess).

Mumbles Lighthouse was built during the 1790s, and was converted to solar powered operation in 1995.

== Notable features ==
Mumbles Pier was opened in 1898 at the terminus of the Swansea and Mumbles Railway, which was the world's first horse-drawn public passenger train service. It was opened on 2 March 1807 and used horse power to 1877, then steam power to 1929, when it switched to double deck overhead electric tram power, lasting till the line closed in Jan 1960.

Mumbles Lifeboat Station has operated since 1866. In 1947, the entire lifeboat crew was lost at sea, attempting to rescue the crew of the SS Samtampa, in what has become known as the Mumbles lifeboat disaster. The nearest church, All Saints' Church, Oystermouth, contains memorials to the crew.

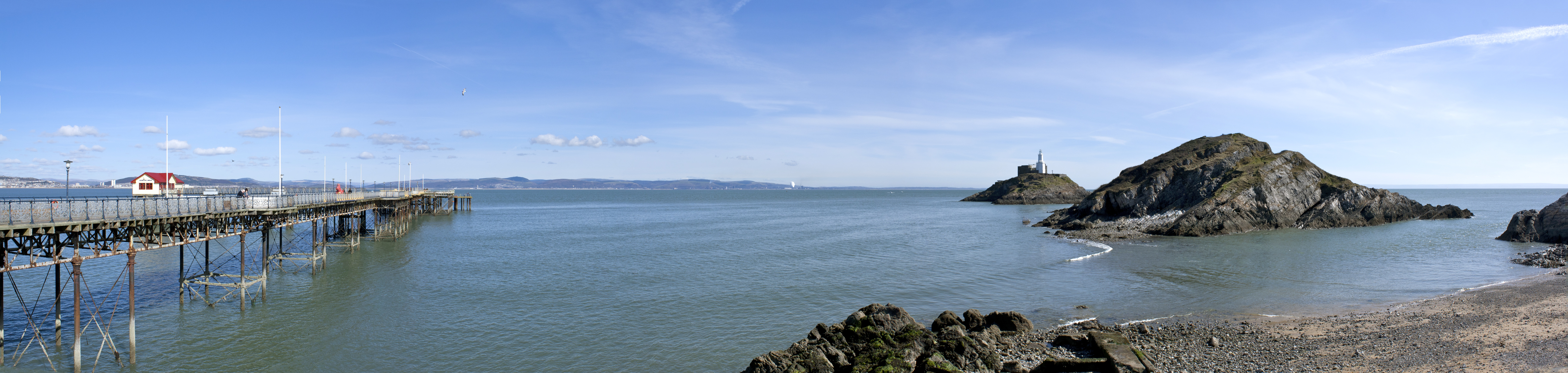
Panoramic photograph of Mumbles Pier; the Lifeboat station and the lighthouse on the right

== See also ==
- Mumbles (district), a district of Swansea
- Mumbles RFC
- Breast-shaped hill
