= Fern Hill =

Poem by Dylan Thomas

"Fern Hill" (1945) is a poem by the Welsh poet Dylan Thomas, first published in Horizon magazine in October 1945, with its first book publication in 1946 as the last poem in Deaths and Entrances.

== Creation ==
Thomas had started writing Fern Hill in New Quay, Cardiganshire, where he lived from 4 September 1944 to July 1945. Further work was done on the poem in July and August 1945 at Blaencwm, the family cottage in Carmarthenshire. A draft was sent to a friend in late August, and then the completed poem to his publisher on 18 September 1945.

The house Fernhill is a Grade II listed residence just outside Llangain in Carmarthenshire. In Thomas's day, it had an orchard and fifteen acres of farmland, most of it of poor quality. Thomas had extended stays here in the 1920s with his aunt Annie and her husband, Jim Jones. They had lived at Fernhill from about 1908 to 1928, renting it from the daughter of Robert Ricketts Evans (also known as Robert Anderson Evans), an occasional hangman and public executioner who once lived in Fernhill. Thomas's own notes about Fernhill confirm that he knew the various stories about Evans the Hangman.

Thomas wrote about Fernhill (calling it Gorsehill) in his short story, The Peaches, in which he describes it as a ramshackle house of hollow fear. Fernhill's dilapidated farmyard and buildings are also described in The Peaches. Jim Jones had shown little interest in farming, as his neighbours had noticed: there was "no work in him...left Fernhill farm to ruins." Jim had sold most of his farming machinery, implements and livestock before moving to Fernhill. He had also been convicted for allowing decomposing animal carcasses to lie around his fields.

Fernhill, said an official survey, had an outside earth closet, water was carried in from a well in the farmyard, washing oneself was done in the kitchen, whilst meals were cooked on an open fire. Its two living rooms were lit by candles and paraffin lamps. The house, said the survey, had "extreme rising dampness" and smelt, wrote Thomas in The Peaches, "of rotten wood and damp and animals".

Thomas's holidays here have been recalled in interviews with his schoolboy friends and with Annie and Jim's neighbours. A further account describes both Thomas's childhood and later years on the family farms between Llangain and Llansteffan, as well as suggesting that the poem Fern Hill was inspired not just by the house Fernhill but by another farm as well.

== Linguistic considerations ==
The poem starts as a straightforward evocation of his childhood visits to his Aunt Annie's farm:

Now as I was young and easy under the apple boughs
About the lilting house and happy as the grass was green,
The night above the dingle starry,

In the middle section, the idyllic scene is expanded upon, reinforced by the lilting rhythm of the poem, the dreamlike, pastoral metaphors and allusion to Eden.

All the sun long it was running, it was lovely, the hay
Fields high as the house, the tunes from the chimneys, it was air...
With the dew, come back, the cock on his shoulder: it was all
Shining, it was Adam and maiden,

By the end, the poet's older voice has taken over, mourning his lost youth with echoes of the opening:

Oh as I was young and easy in the mercy of his means,
Time held me green and dying
Though I sang in my chains like the sea.

The poem uses internal half rhyme and full rhyme as well as end rhyme. Thomas was very conscious of the effect of spoken or intoned verse and explored the potentialities of sound and rhythm, in a manner reminiscent of Gerard Manley Hopkins. He always denied having conscious knowledge of Welsh, but "his lines chime with internal consonantal correspondence, or cynghanedd, a prescribed feature of Welsh versification".

== Legacy ==
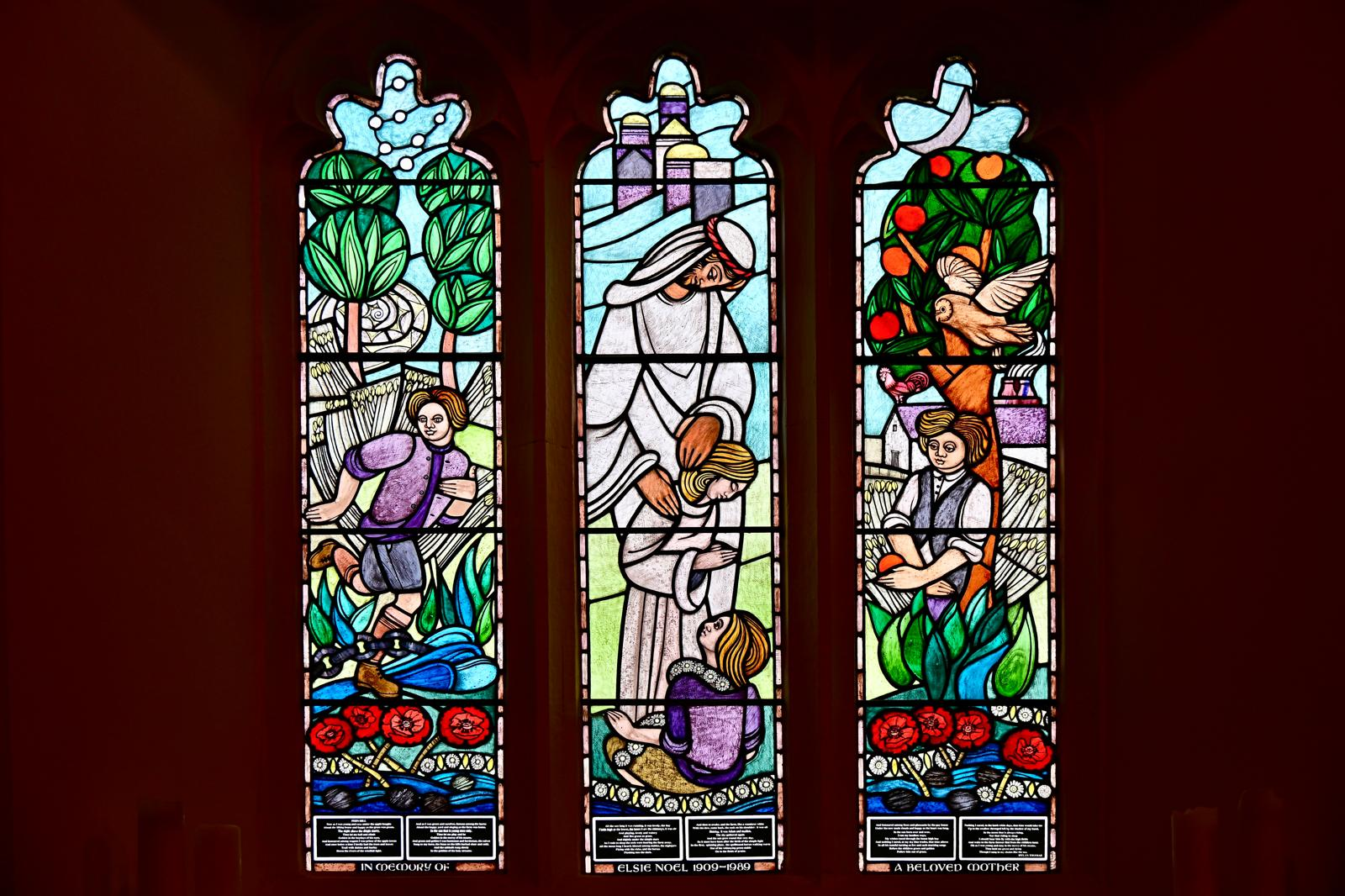
Window in All Saints' Church, Oystermouth on theme of Fern Hill, designed by Tim Lewis (1993)

In 1960, American composer John Corigliano set "Fern Hill" to music as part of A Dylan Thomas Trilogy (1960–1976), a trilogy of choral symphony. The poem is also quoted in the title of the 1973 drama film Happy as the Grass Was Green and in the lyrics of the 2022 song "Blacktop" by Yeah Yeah Yeahs.

A window in All Saints' Church in Oystermouth, Swansea takes Fern Hill as its theme. The window was designed and manufactured by Tim Lewis of Glantawe Studios and was installed in 1993. Across three lights, it shows five figures in an allegorical landscape that alludes to episodes within the poem, the text of which is reproduced at the bottom of the window.
