= Sker Point =

Headland in Wales

Coordinates: 51.50226°N 3.75045°W

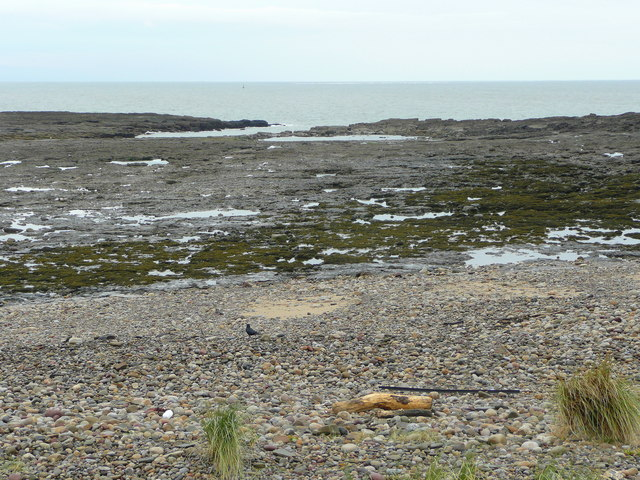
Sker Point, with the inlet of Pwll Dafan

Sker Point is a headland in Bridgend County Borough on the South Wales coast between Port Talbot and Porthcawl. It marks the south end of Kenfig Sands. The placename Sker is of Old Norse origin, and means skerry.

In the Winter 1583(O.S.)/1584(N.S.), the Ann Francis was wrecked here on route to Norfolk. The remains were fought over in court, but some fittings are still being found.

On April 23, 1947, the Samtampa, a liberty ship, was wrecked at Sker Point. Her crew of 39 perished and all eight volunteer crewmen of the Mumbles RNLI lifeboat were lost while attempting to rescue them. There is a memorial plaque set into the rocks of Sker Point.

Sker Point is also the title of a song by the Welsh heavy metal band Triaxis.
