= Ann Francis =

Ship wrecked off Wales in 1583

History
- Name: Ann Francis
- Owner: Francis Shaxton of King's Lynn
- Fate: wrecked on 28 December 1583

General characteristics
- Crew: possibly 14

The Ann Francis was an English merchant ship wrecked near Margam in Wales in 1583. Various artefacts thought to be from the wreck have been found around Margam since the 1970s, including a trove of more than 800 coins uncovered by the metal detectorist Peter Hughes between 1996 and 2017.

== Wreck ==
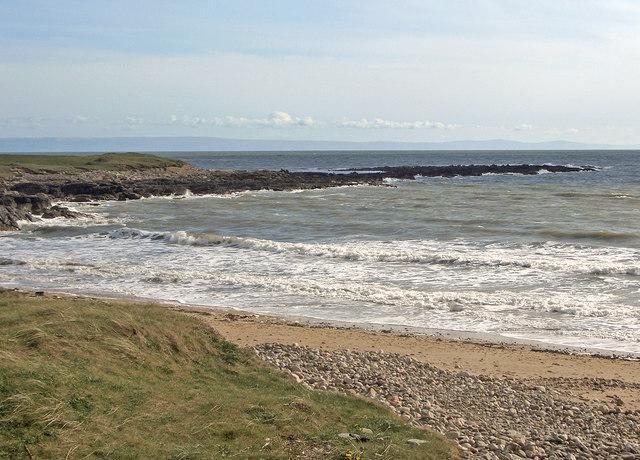
The northern side of Sker Point, near where the Ann Francis was wrecked

The Ann Francis was built for Francis Shaxton of King's Lynn, a cloth merchant and smuggler, probably no earlier than 1580; it was his newest ship. The ship had delivered a cargo of wheat to Spain in October 1583, and was on its way back with the payment when it was driven onto Margam Beach by a storm on 28 December and wrecked just north of Sker Point. (Great Britain still used the Julian calendar at the time; the date of the wreck in Spain, which had already adopted the Gregorian calendar, would have been 7 January 1584.) The ship was returning to Norfolk: it could have ended up in Glamorgan after being blown off course to the north, as a result of navigational error, or both.

=== Casualties ===
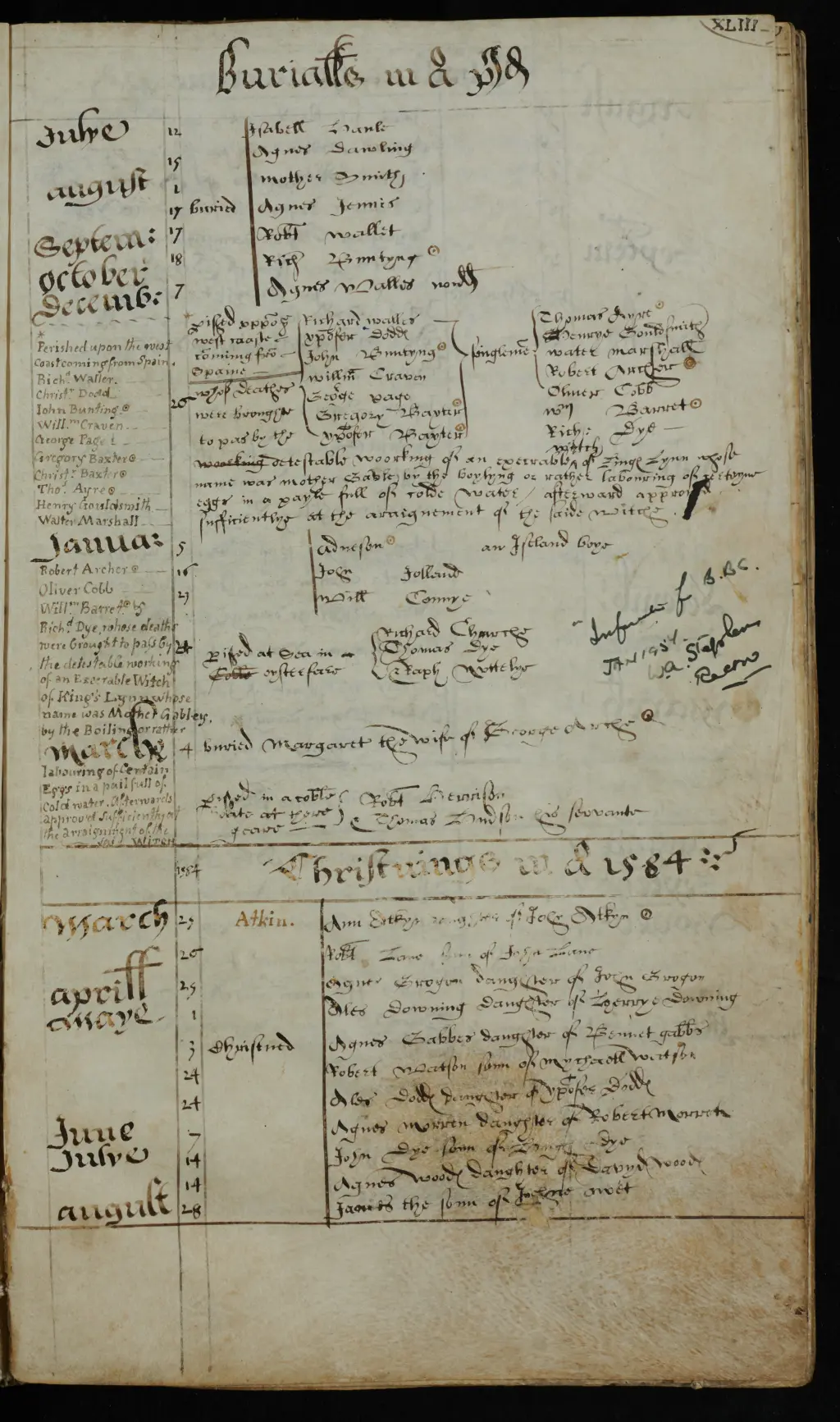
The parish register listing the deaths of the 14 men who may have been the crew of the Ann Francis.

The number of crew aboard the ship and their names are not known for certain. A parish register from Wells-next-the-Sea, near the Ann Francis' home port of King's Lynn, records the deaths of 14 men who "perished upon the west coast coming from Spain" in December of 1583 and who may have been the ship's crew. Their deaths were blamed on the "detestable working" of a local woman, Mother Gabley, who is recorded as being arraigned for witchcraft but whose fate is not known.

=== Legal dispute ===
The local landowner, Sir Edward Mansell (also spelt Mansel and Maunsell), claimed the wreck and accused George Williams, a steward to the Earl of Pembroke, of illegally looting it; Williams in turn claimed that the wreck was actually on land belonging to the Earl and that he had legally impounded it on his lord's behalf. Both Mansell and Williams took cargo and fittings from the wreck and kept them while the legal dispute was happening. Francis Shaxton, the owner, also came forward to claim his property back (while claiming the ship had only been to Hartlepool, rather than Spain.)

The case went to the Star Chamber in 1584, where it was eventually settled in favour of the Earl of Pembroke. Mansell agreed that he would return two anchors, two cables, six cannon, and a quantity of money. Other goods recorded as being taken from the wreck include bolts of calico; nutmeg; cloves; and two boxes of marmalade. The records of the case are preserved in the National Archives as Maunsell v. Williams, reference SCEL-07051.

== Treasure ==
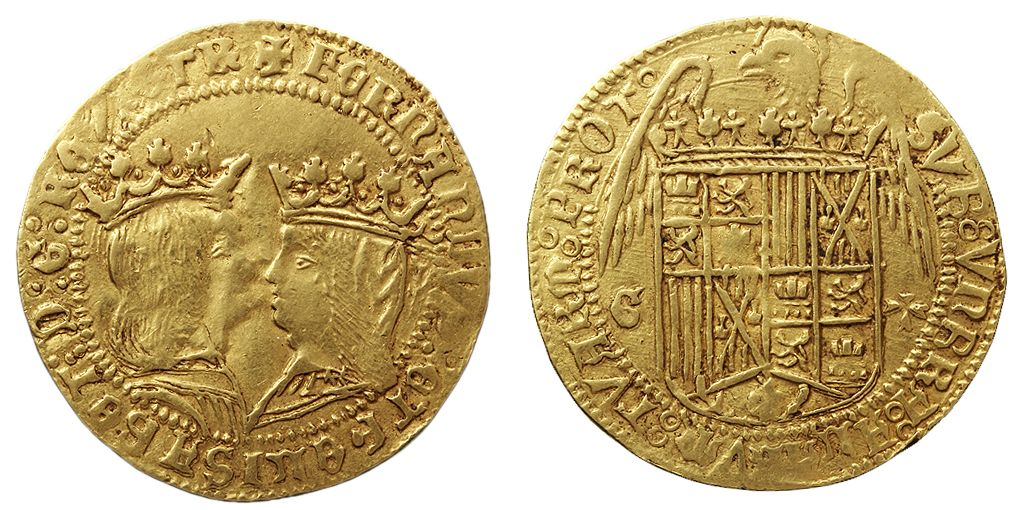
A Spanish doble excelente gold coin, of the same type as some of those recovered from the wreck.

Sixteenth-century maritime artefacts began to be identified on Margam beach in the 1970s, and research in subsequent decades determined that the Ann Francis was the most likely source. Between 1996 and 2017, local detectorist Peter Hughes uncovered the bulk of the finds now associated with the wreck, including spoons, compasses, ship's equipment, a brass combination lock and more than 800 gold and silver Spanish, Portuguese and German coins. The combination lock has 4 wheels with 1,296 possible combinations. It was decoded using data from CT scans in 2026 with the open position revealed to be ANCE.

Hughes turned the trove over to Amgueddfa Cymru – Museum Wales, considering it to be part of the "heritage of Wales", and it now resides at the National Waterfront Museum in Swansea. It went on display as part of the Trysorau'r Tonnau / Tides of Treasure exhibition in 2026. The then Senedd culture secretary, Heledd Fychan, described it as "a remarkable piece of Welsh history".

It is believed that there may be more artefacts from the ship as yet undiscovered. To protect the area where they would most likely be, two areas off Margam were together designated a scheduled monument under the name "Wrecking site of the Ann Francis" on 4 July 2025.
