= The Mumbles Lifeboat Station =

RNLI lifeboat station in Swansea, Wales

- Gorsaf Bad Achub Y Mwmbwls

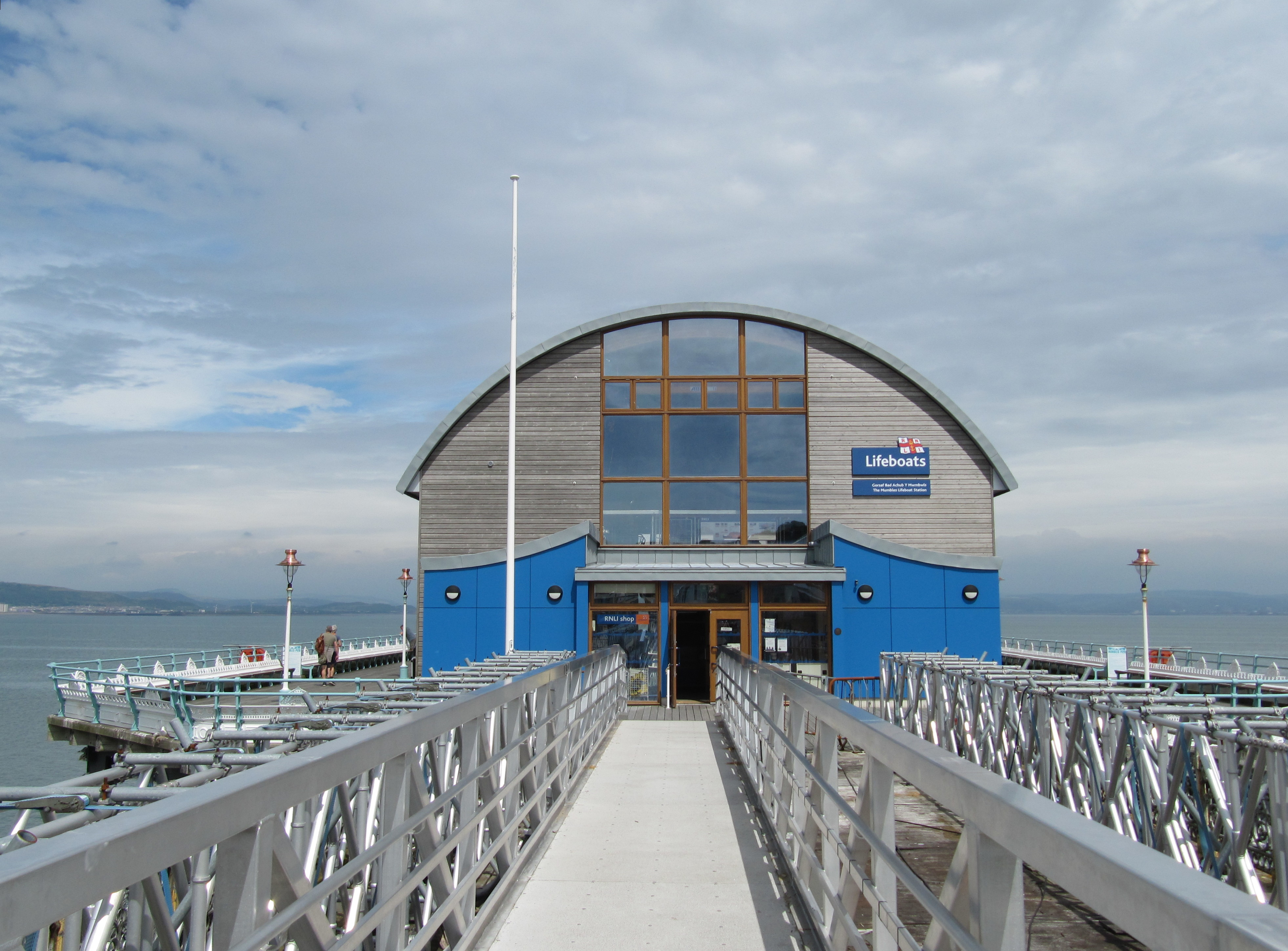
- Mumbles Lifeboat Station, opened in 2014

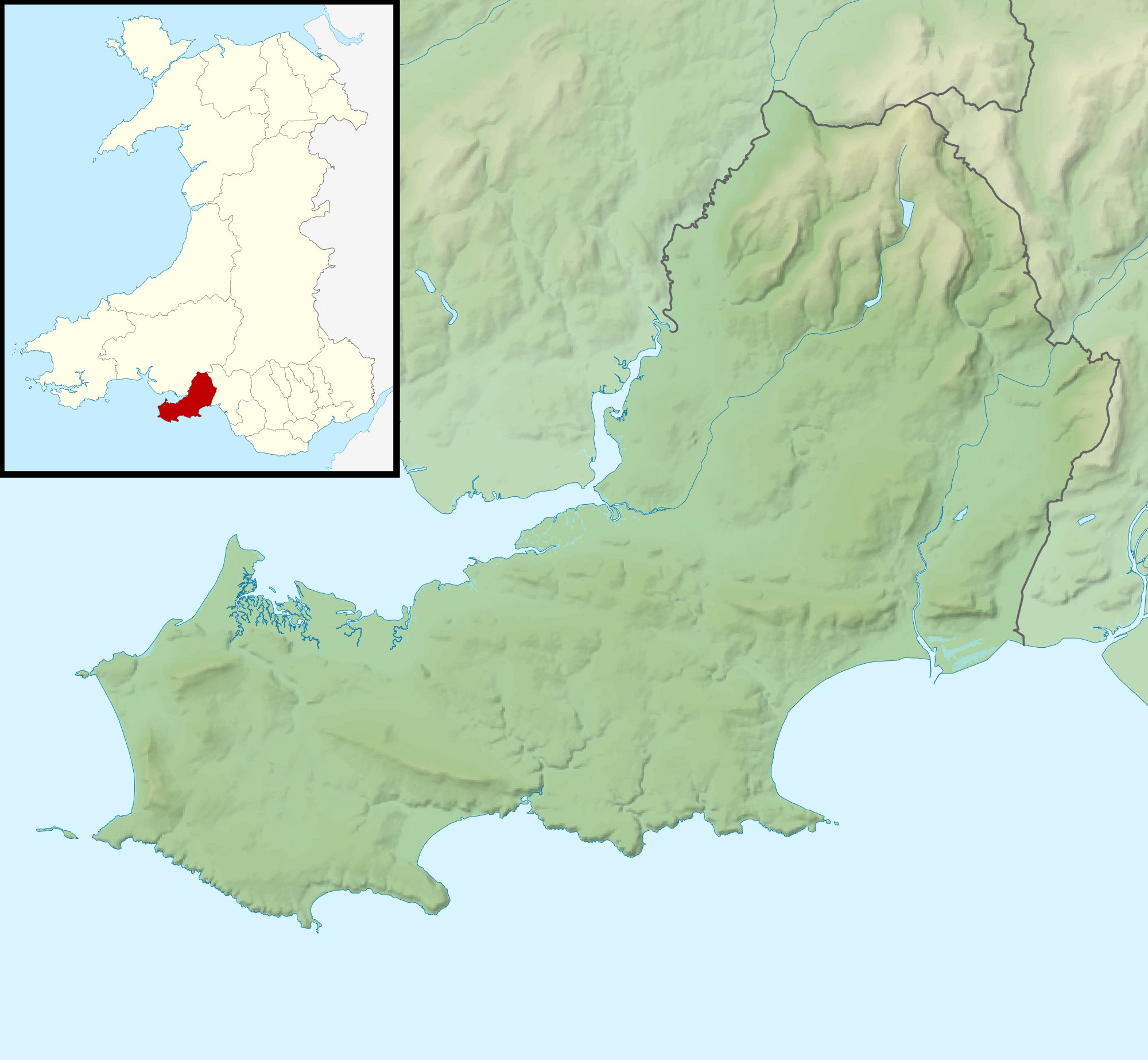
- Location within Swansea
- Former names: Swansea Lifeboat Station

General information
- Type: RNLI Lifeboat Station
- Location: Mumbles Pier, Pier Road, Mumbles, Swansea, Wales, SA3 4EN, UK
- Coordinates: 51°34′11.6″N 3°58′26.9″W
- Opened: 1835; 1863 (RNLI)
- Owner: Royal National Lifeboat Institution

Website
- The Mumbles RNLI Lifeboat Station

The Mumbles Lifeboat Station (Welsh: Gorsaf Bad Achub Y Mwmbwls) is at Mumbles Pier, located at the south-western corner of Swansea Bay, near the village of Mumbles, within the city and county of Swansea, in the historic county of Glamorgan, Wales.

A lifeboat was first placed at The Mumbles in 1835, provided by the Royal National Institution for the Preservation of Life from Shipwreck (RNIPLS), but managed by Swansea Harbour Trustees. Management of the station, by now located in Swansea, and known as Swansea Lifeboat Station, was taken over by the Royal National Lifeboat Institution (RNLI) in 1863, and moved back to Mumbles in 1866.

The station currently operates a Tamar-class all-weather lifeboat, 16-27 Roy Barker IV (ON 1307), on station since 2014, and the smaller D-class (IB1) inshore lifeboat, Hugh, Maureen and Heather Pope (D-895), on station since 2024.

== History ==
In February 1832, the cutter Ilfracombe Packet ran aground, whilst trying to enter Swansea harbour. Silvanus Padley, son of the harbour trust clerk, having been initially refused the loan of the Customs officers' boat, smashed its securing lock, and put out with five pilots to aid the vessel.

This was just one of dozens of incidents that prompted discussion and demands for a lifeboat, but despite meetings and action plans by the Swansea Harbour Trust, and the formation of a committee including Silvanus Padley, nothing was done.

In October 1833, John Bevan, Master of the schooner Gower, swam out to the brig Andrew and Margaret of Maryport, on passage from Devon to Cardiff, when it ran aground at Margam, Rescuing one man in the water, he also got a line to the vessel, and the remaining crew of four were also saved. Bevan was awarded the RNIPLS Silver Medal.

Finally, in 1835, a petition from locals for the provision of a lifeboat, to be stationed at Mumbles in the charge of the Inspecting Officer of Coastguard, was sent via the Swansea MP John Henry Vivian, to the Royal National Institution for the Preservation of Life from Shipwreck (RNIPLS), who agreed to provide a lifeboat. A 28-foot (12-oared) non-self-righting Palmer lifeboat, was ordered from Taylor of Blackwall, London, costing £120. There are no service records for the boat. On 3 May 1851, Capt. Edwards of Swansea Harbour Trust reported the boat unserviceable, adding that it had never been regarded as a good boat, and was the reason no money had been spent on its upkeep by the trustees. In 1859, Capt. Crewe-Read, RN, Coastguard Inspector at Swansea, reported that there had been a lifeboat at Mumbles for some years, but had proved useless there, and had been taken to Swansea.

Meanwhile, ships had still been wrecked, and rescues had taken place. The RNIPLS awarded no less than nine Silver Medals for rescues in the area between 1835 and 1840.

The harbour trustees ordered a new lifeboat in 1855. It was in fact a legal requirement, as under the Harbours, Docks and Piers Clauses Act 1847, operators of dock facilities were required to provide a lifeboat. A 30-foot Peake-class self-righting 'Pulling and Sailing' (P&S) lifeboat, one with oars and sails, was constructed by Forrestt of Limehouse, arriving in Swansea on 1 April 1856. A boathouse was constructed next to the Swansea harbour office, at a cost of £64-17s-0d.

In 1863, a meeting of the harbour trustees was held with Capt. John Ward of the RNLI, (the RNIPLS having become the RNLI in 1854). He was firmly of the opinion that the lifeboat should be stationed at Mumbles Head, and it was agreed that the RNLI would undertake this. A site for the boathouse was provided by Henry Somerset, 8th Duke of Beaufort, and a tender of £174 from James Randall of Kidwelly was accepted, for its construction.

Initially, a 30-foot (10-oared) self-righting 'Pulling and Sailing' (P&S) lifeboat was provided, one with both oars and sails, arriving in 1863, and being named Martha and Anne. The boat was kept at the Swansea South Dock, awaiting completion of the Mumbles boathouse. The boat wasn't new, and had previously served at Drogheda No.1. The boathouse was ready in 1864, but couldn't be used, as plans to extend the railway there had developed. However, a number of incidents occurred off the Mumbles, and the boat was finally transferred to Mumbles in January 1866, although she would be stored in the open, under the cliffs. Finally it was confirmed that the railway extension had been abandoned, and construction of the slipway could start. Soon afterwards, the RNLI provided a new lifeboat, the 33-foot Wolverhampton.

During a gale on Saturday 27 January 1883, the German barque Admiral Prinz Aldabert was driven onto rocks near the Mumbles Lighthouse. Wolverhampton went out to assist and was capsized multiple times, finally being washed on to rocks. The lifeboat was badly damaged, and four of the lifeboat crew drowned, with others being seriously injured. Coxswain Jenkin Jenkins was awarded the RNIPLS Silver Medal, but had lost two sons in the incident.

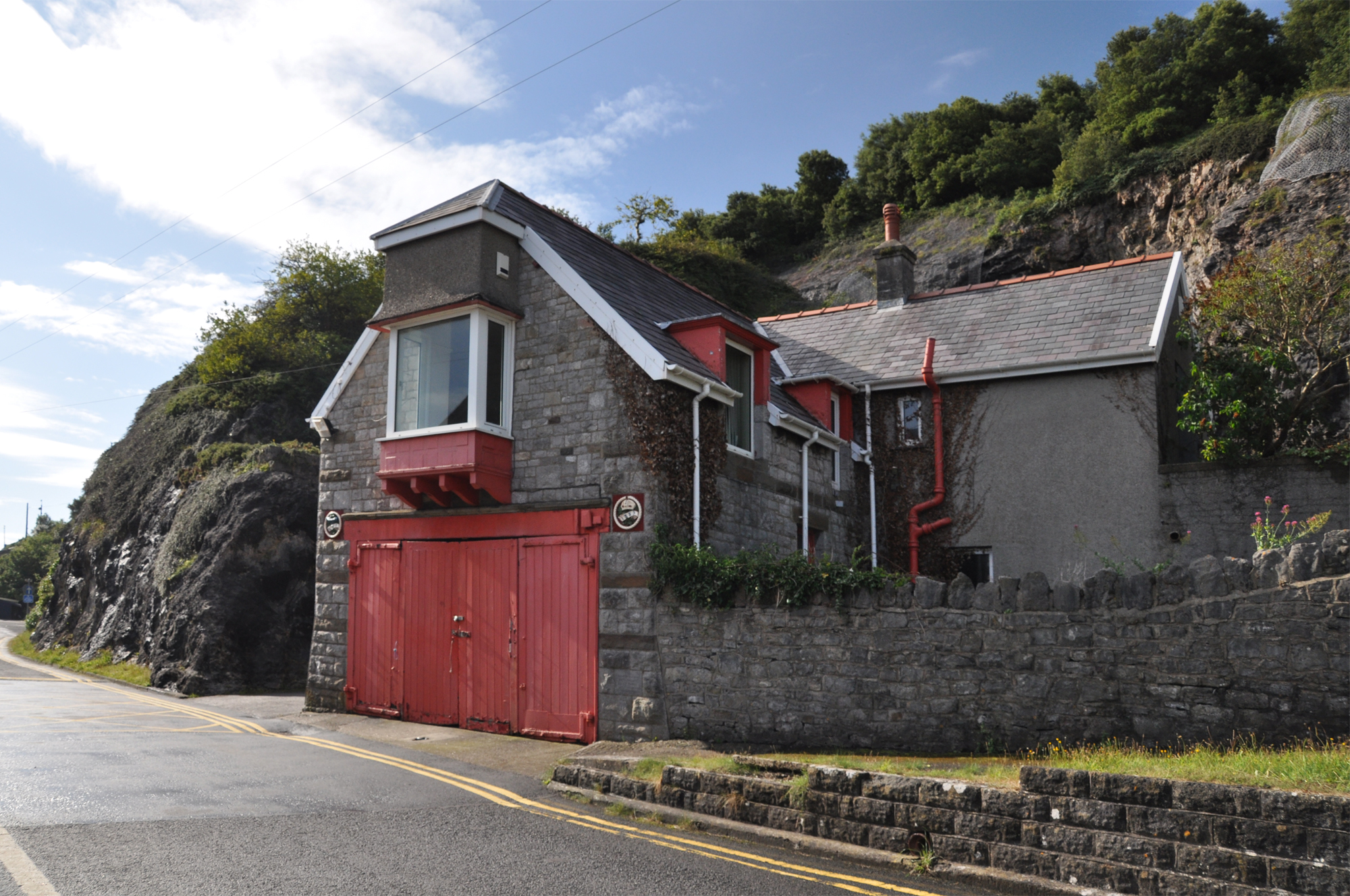
1884 Mumbles Lifeboat House

The badly damaged lifeboat Wolverhampton was withdrawn, and replaced with a slightly larger 34-foot 8in lifeboat, also to be named Wolverhampton (ON 229). The boathouse was demolished and rebuilt, by Watkins and Jenkins, at a cost of £350, completed in 1884. In 1888, a new 15-foot wide, 60-foot long slipway was constructed, at a cost of £110. In 1897, Mumbles Railway and Pier Company constructed a new slipway for the RNLI, at no cost to the Institution, as they extended the railway across the top of it, right past the boathouse, to reach the Mumbles Pier, which was under construction.

On 31 January 1903, the steamship Christina of Waterford ran aground on Aberavon sands. The crew were able to walk ashore at low tide. The following day, Mumbles lifeboat James Stevens No. 12 (ON 432) was launched into gale-force conditions, to stand by the vessel as she refloated. Deciding to take shelter in the mouth of the River Afan, the lifeboat was hit by huge waves, and capsized twice. Six of the ten men thrown into the water were lost, including Coxswain Thomas Rogers, and David Morgan, a survivor of the 1883 capsize.

James Stevens No. 12 was withdrawn from service. After a short period with relief lifeboat Reserve No. 4 (ON 378), the 37-foot lifeboat Quiver No.1 (ON 265) (Reserve No.3A) was placed on service. Too long for the boathouse, she was moored afloat, and a second boat, former Donna Nook lifeboat Richard (ON 248), was modified, and housed in the boathouse, to be used as a boarding boat.

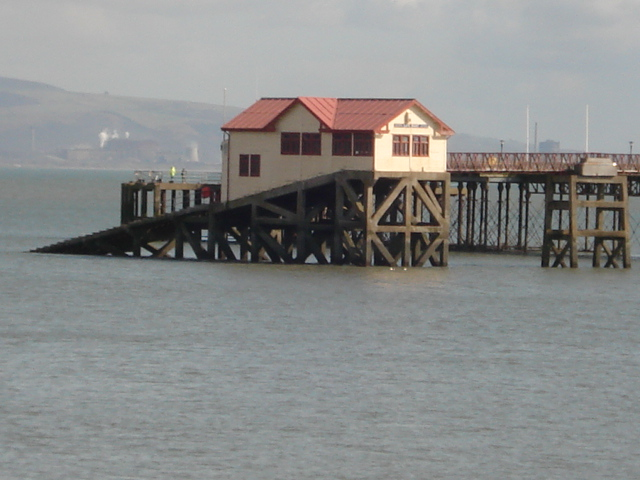
1922 Mumbles Lifeboat Station, used until 2014

In October 1904, the station officially became The Mumbles Lifeboat Station.

At a meeting of the Mumbles lifeboat committee in 1905, it was agreed that a boathouse and slipway, accessed via the new Mumbles Pier, was the way forward. It would be 1916 before the slipway was constructed, and a further six years in 1922, before a boathouse was completed, constructed on top of the slipway. The boathouse would remain in use until 2014.

== Notable Rescues ==
On 4 October 1944, the Canadian frigate HMCS Chebogue was hit by a torpedo, whilst escorting westbound Atlantic convoy ONS 33. With all other crew taken off, she was towed 890 miles, with just 37 men and six officers still aboard. She arrived in Swansea Bay on 11 Oct under tow from the Ocean Tug HMS Earner, but arrived in worsening conditions, of hurricane force. The tow line was lost, and the vessel ran aground on Port Talbot bar.

The Mumbles lifeboat Edward, Prince of Wales (ON 678) was launched at 7:45pm. Due to the position of the vessel, and in extremely difficult conditions, the lifeboat had to make 12 visits to the ship, rescuing three or four men at a time. One man broke a leg, one jumped and landed on the Coxswain, who was badly bruised, and a third fell between the boats, fortunate not to be crushed, but all were rescued. Coxswain William John Gannon was awarded the RNLI Gold Medal, with other awards made to the crew.

== The Mumbles lifeboat disaster 1947 ==
A third disaster would strike the Mumbles lifeboat. On 23 April 1947, the Mumbles lifeboat Edward, Prince of Wales was launched to the aid of the Liberty ship Samtampa, which was bound for Newport, but had developed engine trouble in a violent gale, and was reported drifting towards Nash Shoal. The lifeboat was last seen just after 7pm. The Samtampa came ashore at Sker Point, and broke into three sections. All of the 39 crew of the Samtampa perished. At dawn, the upturned wrecked lifeboat could be seen. All eight lifeboatmen were also lost, including RNLI Gold medal holder Coxswain William John Gannon.

== Today ==
The D-class lifeboat is the main workhorse of the station, being used for more than 60 per cent of the callouts. In 2014 a new Tamar class lifeboat entered service at The Mumbles, temporarily based at Swansea Marina while a new, larger, boathouse and slipway were constructed on the end of Mumbles pier. In 2015 and 2016, Mumbles was the busiest station in Wales, launching 83 times, and was the busiest station in 2022, with 126 launches.

In January 2023, safety concerns over access over the existing pier to the station, caused the station building to be closed. The current pier owners do not have the funds to pay for essential repairs. The lifeboat is currently kept afloat at a mooring.

== Station honours ==
The following are awards made at The Mumbles:

- RNLI Gold Medal
  William John Gammon, Coxswain – 1944
- RNIPLS Silver Medal
  John Bevan, Master of the schooner Gower – 1833
  William Evans – 1835
  John Reeve, Master of the schooner Wave – 1838
  Capt. Thomas Jones – 1839
  Capt. John Howell – 1839
  Capt. Charles Sutton – 1839
  Capt. Joseph Foley – 1839
  Arthur Rees – 1839
  Lewis Jenkins – 1839
  Capt. Joseph Foley (Second-service clasp) – 1840
- RNLI Silver Medal
  Jenkin Jenkins, Coxswain – 1883
  Lionel Derek Scott, Coxswain – 1964
  Lionel Derek Scott BEM, Coxswain (Second-service clasp) – 1971
- RNLI Bronze Medal
  William John Gammon, Coxswain – 1941
  Robert Trevor Williams, Mechanic – 1941
  William Gilbert Davies, Mechanic – 1944
  Thomas John Ace, Bowman – 1944
  Lionel Derek Scott, Coxswain – 1968
- 'The Thanks of the Institution inscribed on Vellum'
  Gunner Edward Hutchings, RA – 1883
  Charles R. Davies, crew member – 1944
  Thomas A. Davies, crew member – 1944
  William John Eynon, crew member – 1944
  Alfred D. Michael, crew member – 1944
  William Michael, crew member – 1944
  W. Davies, Second Coxswain – 1964
  J. Gammon, Mechanic – 1964
  W. Tucker, Assistant Mechanic – 1964
  J. Bailey, Signalman – 1964
  K. Kostromin – 1964
  G. Parsons – 1964
  H. Randall – 1964
  J. Whitford – 1964
  Alan Richards Jones, Helm – 1971
  Peter Allan Algie, crew member – 1971
  Anthony David Lewis, crew member – 1971
  Lionel Derek Scott BEM, Coxswain – 1981
  Anthony David Lewis, Helm – 1983
- The Maud Smith award 1944
  for the bravest act of life-saving in 1944
  William John Gammon, Coxswain – 1944
- 'A Framed Letter of Thanks signed by the Chairman of the Institution'
  W. Clements – 1973
- Bronze Medal and Certificate of Thanks, awarded by the Royal Humane Society
  R. J. Gammon, Mechanic – 1948
- Binocular glasses from The Emperor of Germany
  Jenkin Jenkins, Coxswain – 1874
- Engraved Statuette of a Lifeboatman
  Lionel Derek Scott BEM, Coxswain – 1980
- British Empire Medal
  Lionel Derek Scott, Coxswain – 1970QBH
- Member, Order of the British Empire (MBE)
  Capt. Peter Royall Griffiths, Deputy Launch Authority – 2009NYH

== Roll of honour ==
In memory of those lost whilst serving The Mumbles lifeboat:

- Mumbles lifeboat Wolverhampton capsized multiple times, on service to the barque Admiral Prinz Adalbert of Danzig, 27 January 1883
  John Jenkins, Second Coxswain
  William Jenkins, crew member
  William Henry Macnamara, crew member (40)
  William Rogers, crew member
- James Stevens No. 12 capsized on service to the steamship Christina of Waterford, 1 February 1903
  Thomas Arthur Rogers, Coxswain (39)
  Daniel Claypitt, Second Coxswain (42)
  George Michael, crew member (51)
  James Gammon, crew member (50)
  Robert Smith, crew member (40)
  David John Morgan, crew member (49) (Survivor of 1883 capsize)
- RNLB Edward, Prince of Wales (ON 678) capsized, and was wrecked, whilst on service to the Liberty ship SS Samtampa, 23 April 1947
  William John Gammon, Coxswain (47)
  William Noel, Second Coxswain (42)
  William Gilbert Davies, Mechanic (42)
  Ernest Griffin, Assistant Mechanic (52)
  William Richard Scourfield Thomas, Bowman (50)
  William Lewis Howell, crew member (35)
  William Ronald Thomas, crew member (34)
  Richard H. Smith, crew member (35)

== The Mumbles lifeboats ==
=== Pulling and Sailing (P&S) lifeboats ===
ON (Note: ON is the RNLI's Official Number of the boat.)	Name	Built	On station	Class	Comments
–	Unnamed	1835	1835–1851	28-foot Palmer	(Note: 28-foot x 6-foot (6-oared) Palmer non-self-righting lifeboat, funded by the RNIPLS, built by Taylor of Blackwall, London, costing £62.); Condemned in 1851.
Pre-299	Unnamed (Swansea)	1856	1856–1863	30-foot Peake self-righting (P&S)	(Note: 30 ft 0 in (9.14 m) x 7 ft 6 in (2.29 m) (10-oared) Peake-class self-righting (P&S) lifeboat, funded by the Swansea Harbour trust, built by Forrestt of Limehouse, London, costing £160.); Condemned in 1863.
Pre-301	Martha and Anne (Swansea)	1856	1863–1866	30-foot Peake self-righting (P&S)	(Note: 30 ft 0 in (9.14 m) x 7 ft 6 in (2.29 m) (10-oared) Peake-class self-righting (P&S) lifeboat, built by Forrestt of Limehouse, London, costing £156 when new.); Previously at Drogheda No.1. Sold in 1866.
Pre-455	Wolverhampton	1866	1866–1883	33-foot Peake self-righting (P&S)	(Note: 33 ft 0 in (10.06 m) x 8 ft 1 in (2.46 m) (10-oared) self-righting (P&S) lifeboat, funded by the Wolverhampton LB fund, built by Forrestt of Limehouse, London, costing £291.); Wrecked on 21 January 1883.
229	Wolverhampton	1883	1883–1898	34-foot self-righting (P&S)	(Note: 34 ft 0 in (10.36 m) x 8 ft 3 in (2.51 m) (10-oared) self-righting (P&S) lifeboat, funded by the Wolverhampton LB fund, built by Woolfe of Shadwell, London, costing £363.); Broken up in 1898.
173	Reserve No.5	1888	1898–1900	34-foot self-righting (P&S)	(Note: 34 ft 0 in (10.36 m) x 8 ft 0 in (2.44 m) (10-oared) self-righting (P&S) lifeboat, built by Willans and Robinson of Thames Ditton, costing £379.); Sold in 1900.
436	James Stevens No. 12	1900	1900–1903	35-foot self-righting (P&S)	(Note: 35 ft 0 in (10.67 m) x 8 ft 6 in (2.59 m) (10-oared) self-righting (P&S) lifeboat, legacy of Mr J. Stevens of Birmingham, built by Thames Ironworks of Blackwall, London, costing £765.); Wrecked on service, 1 February 1903.
378	Reserve No.4	1895	1903	36-foot self-righting (P&S)	(Note: 36 ft 0 in (10.97 m) x 8 ft 3 in (2.51 m) self-righting (P&S) lifeboat, gift of the Misses Smitheman of Albury, built by Waterman of Cremyll, costing £319 when new.); Previously Elizabeth and Blanche at Penzance. Later at Staithes.
265	Reserve No.3A	1883	1903–1905	37-foot self-righting (P&S)	(Note: 37 ft 0 in (11.28 m) x 9 ft 0 in (2.74 m) self-righting (P&S) lifeboat.); Previously Quiver No.1 at Margate. Transferred to Newhaven.
248	Richard	1889	1904–1923	34-foot Boarding Boat	(Note: 34-foot ex-lifeboat, formerly at Donna Nook, stripped of excess weight and air cases.)
535	Charlie Medland	1904	1905–1924	43-foot Watson (P&S)	(Note: 43 ft 0 in (13.11 m) x 12 ft 6 in (3.81 m) (10-oared) Watson-class non-self-righting (P&S) lifeboat, legacy of Mr C. Medland of Clapham, built by Thames Ironworks of Blackwall, London, costing £1,694.); Transferred to Southend-on-Sea.

Pre ON numbers are unofficial numbers used by the Lifeboat Enthusiasts' Society to reference early lifeboats not included on the official RNLI list.

=== Motor lifeboats ===
ON	Op.No. (Note: Op. No. is the RNLI's Operational Number of the boat carried on the hull.)	Name	Built	On station	Class	Comments
678	–	Edward, Prince of Wales	1924	1924–1947	45-foot Watson	
849	–	William Gammon - Manchester and District XXX	1947	1947–1974	46-foot 9in Watson	
940	–	Pentland (Civil Service No.31)	1957	1974–1985	47-foot Watson	Previously at Thurso. Transferred to Workington
1096	47-005	Ethel Anne Measures	1985	1985–2006	Tyne	
1127	47-019	Babs & Agnes Robertson	1987	2006–2014	Tyne	Previously at Peterhead
1307	16-27	Roy Barker IV	2013	2014–	Tamar	

More post-service details can be found on the respective lifeboat class pages.

=== Inshore lifeboats ===
Op.No.	Name	On station	Class	Comments
D-44	Unnamed	1965–1972	D-class (RFD PB16)	
D-199	Unnamed	1972–1986	D-class (RFD PB16)	
D-319	Unnamed	1986–1994	D-class (EA16)	
D-463	Nellie Grace Hughes	1994–2003	D-class (EA16)	
D-459	Margaret and Fiona Wood	2003–2004	D-class (EA16)	
D-623	Peterborough Beer Festival II	2004–2013	D-class (IB1)	
D-761	Mark Lott	2013–2024	D-class (IB1)	
D-895	Hugh, Maureen and Heather Pope	2024–	D-class (IB1)	

== See also ==
- List of RNLI stations
- List of former RNLI stations
- Royal National Lifeboat Institution lifeboats
