= SS Samtampa =

World War II Liberty ship of the United States

- A Liberty ship at sea

History

United States
- Name: Peleg Wadsworth
- Namesake: Peleg Wadsworth
- Builder: New England Shipbuilding Corporation, South Portland, Maine
- Yard number: 2203
- Way number: 2
- Laid down: 1 November 1943
- Launched: 12 December 1943
- Completed: 22 December 1943
- Fate: Sent to the UK under Lend-Lease, 1943

United Kingdom
- Name: SS Samtampa
- Operator: Houlder Line
- Fate: Wrecked, 1947

General characteristics (as built)
- Class & type: Type EC2-S-C1 Liberty ship
- Displacement: 14,245 long tons (14,474 t)
- Length: 441 ft 6 in (134.57 m) o/a; 417 ft 9 in (127.33 m) p/p; 427 ft (130 m) w/l
- Beam: 57 ft (17 m)
- Draft: 27 ft 9 in (8.46 m)
- Propulsion: Two oil-fired boilers; Triple-expansion steam engine; 2,500 hp (1,900 kW); Single screw
- Speed: 11 knots (20 km/h; 13 mph)
- Range: 20,000 nmi (37,000 km; 23,000 mi)
- Capacity: 10,856 t (10,685 long tons) deadweight (DWT)
- Crew: 81
- Armament: Stern-mounted 4 in (100 mm) deck gun; Variety of anti-aircraft guns

SS Samtampa was a 7,219 ton steamship wrecked on Sker Point, off Porthcawl and Kenfig, Wales, in the Bristol Channel on 23 April 1947. At the time of the shipwreck, the Samtampa was operated by the Houlder Line. The Samtampa had been launched as the SS Peleg Wadsworth, a liberty ship built by the New England Shipbuilding Corporation at South Portland, Maine, and launched on 12 December 1943. Sent to Britain under the Lend-Lease program, the ship was renamed, and managed by the Houlder Line on behalf of the Ministry of War Transport.

There were 47 fatalities in the incident, 39 from the ship and 8 volunteer crew of the lifeboat RNLB Edward, Prince of Wales (ON 678) from The Mumbles Lifeboat Station who died attempting to save the crew of the Samtampa. The lifeboat had returned to base, but had been sent out a second time. An oil spill from the tanks of the wrecked ship created an area of calm water, which the lifeboat coxswain, William Gammon (previously a winner of the RNLI Gold Medal), attempted to use to their advantage to enable them to pull alongside, and those who died were choked by the oil rather than drowning. The ship had sailed from Middlesbrough and most of the 39 crew hailed from the Teesside area.

A memorial to the victims of the Samtampa tragedy is in Porthcawl Cemetery and a commemorative plaque can be found marking the "final resting place of The Mumbles lifeboat" at Sker Point. The location of the wreck was 51°30′01″N 03°44′26″W

In recognition of the sixtieth anniversary, a church service took place in Porthcawl on Saturday 21 April followed by a smaller service at Sker Point. On Sunday 23 April 2022, Porthcawl Runners hosted a 75th anniversary fun run on Mumbles Seafront. A year later, they held a similar run at Porthcawl Promenade, slightly longer in length, but with twice as many entrants. So, far the events have raised over £3000 for the RNLI and it is hoped that with its growing popularity, the event will take place every year.
