= St David's Head =

Headland in Pembrokeshire, Wales

St David's Head Penmaen Dewi
- headland
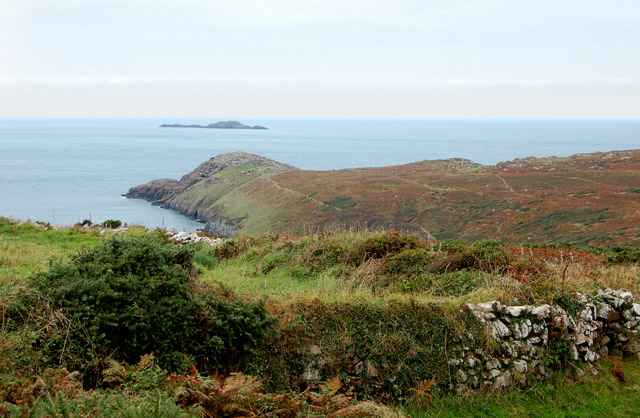

- Location in Wales
- Coordinates: 51°54′10″N 5°18′45″W
- Location: Pembrokeshire, Wales

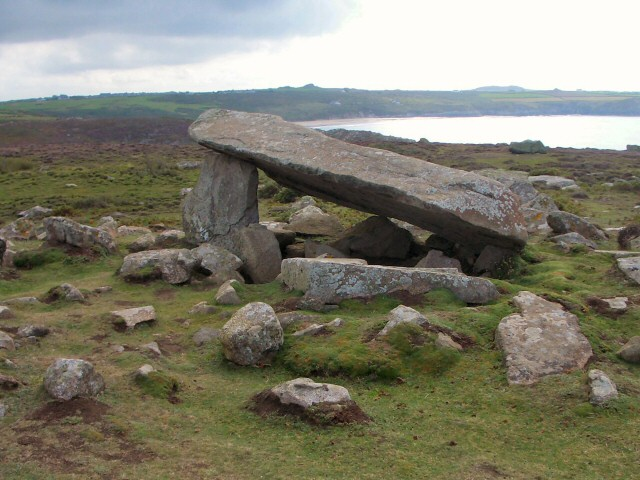
Coetan Arthur burial chamber

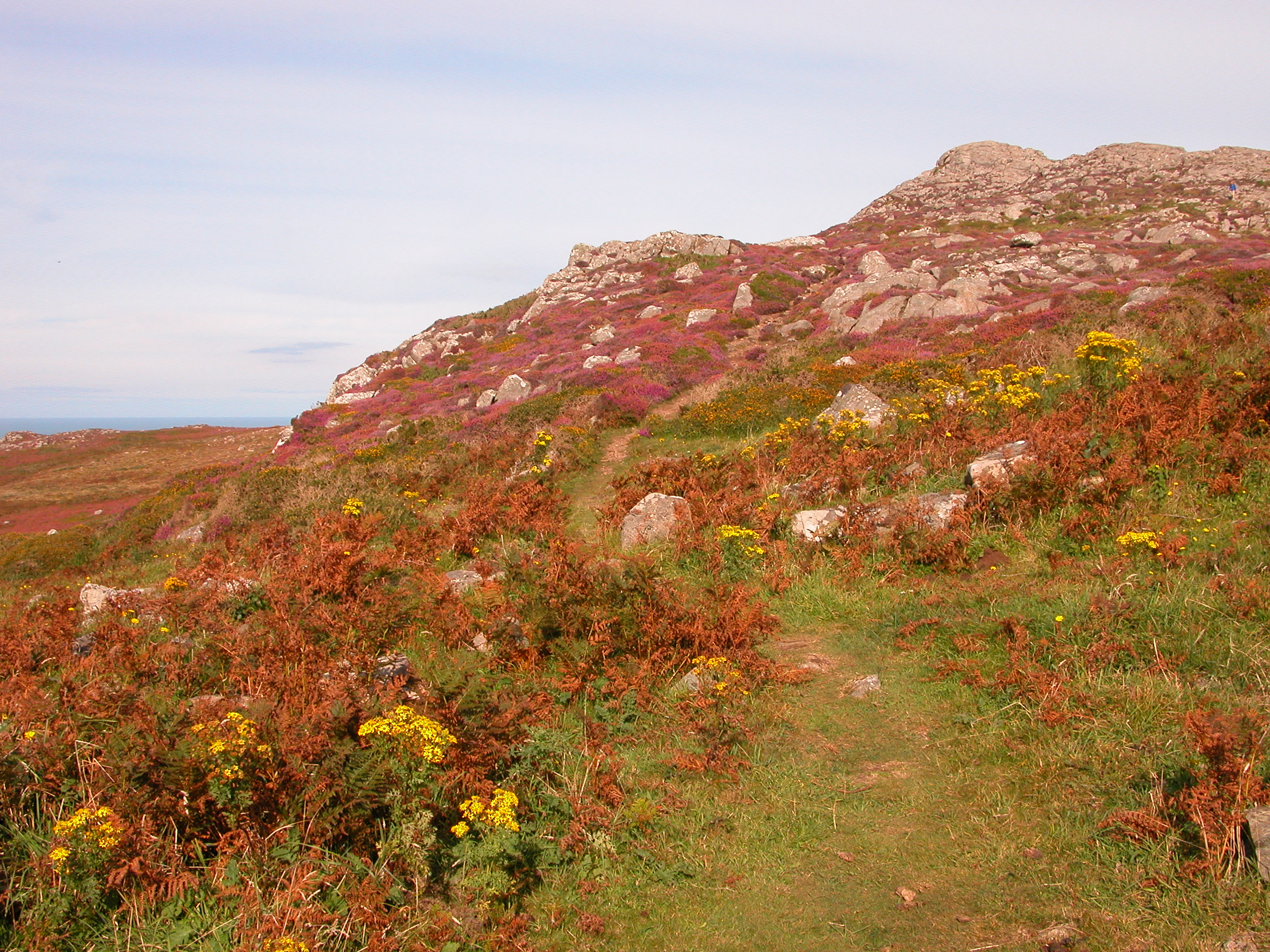
Carn Llidi from St David's Head

St David's Head (Welsh: Penmaen Dewi) is a headland in the Pembrokeshire Coast National Park, southwest Wales, which marks the divide between the Irish Sea and the Celtic Sea. It is noted for its wildflowers and wildlife, and for the remains of ancient human settlement. The headland and its immediate hinterland are owned by the National Trust, and are accessible to the public by foot via the Pembrokeshire Coast Path.

The westernmost point of mainland Wales, Pen Dal-aderyn, is located just to the south of St David's Head.

== Geography ==
St David's Head is situated about 2.5 miles (4 km) northwest of the cathedral city of St David's in Pembrokeshire. This headland marks the narrowest point of St George's Channel, the southern limit of Cardigan Bay and the Irish Sea in Wales, and the northern boundary of the Celtic Sea. There are views to the south of Whitesands Bay, Ramsey Sound (separating Ramsey Island) and St Brides Bay; to the west, of the Bishops and Clerks rocks; and to the east, of the slopes of the large rocky outcrop known as Carn Llidi.

== Ecology ==
The headland is abundant in wildflowers and wildlife and the waters around it provide a rich habitat for fish, grey seals and porpoises. A variety of seabirds and peregrine falcons are also to be seen.

== History ==
There are a number of ancient monuments showing signs of early occupation, including an Iron Age cliff fort, prehistoric settlements, a prehistoric defensive wall, signs of various neolithic field systems and Coetan Arthur (Arthur’s Quoit) burial chamber.

Described in a Roman survey of the known world in 140 AD (Ptolemy's Geography) as the 'Promontory of the Eight Perils' (Οκταπιταρον Ακρον - Oktapitaron Akron - in Ptolemy's original Greek).

Tarleton, a slaver of 400 tons burthen, foundered on 28 November 1788 off St David's Head on her fourth slaving voyage from Liverpool to Africa. Her crew was saved.

In 1793, Sir Richard Colt Hoare said in his "Journal of a Tour of South Wales":

"No place could ever be more suited to retirement, contemplation or Druidical mysteries, surrounded by inaccessible rock and open to a wide expanse of ocean. Nothing seems wanting but the thick impenetrable groves of oaks which have been thought concomitant to places of Druidical worship and which, from the exposed nature of this situation, would never, I think, have existed here even in former days."

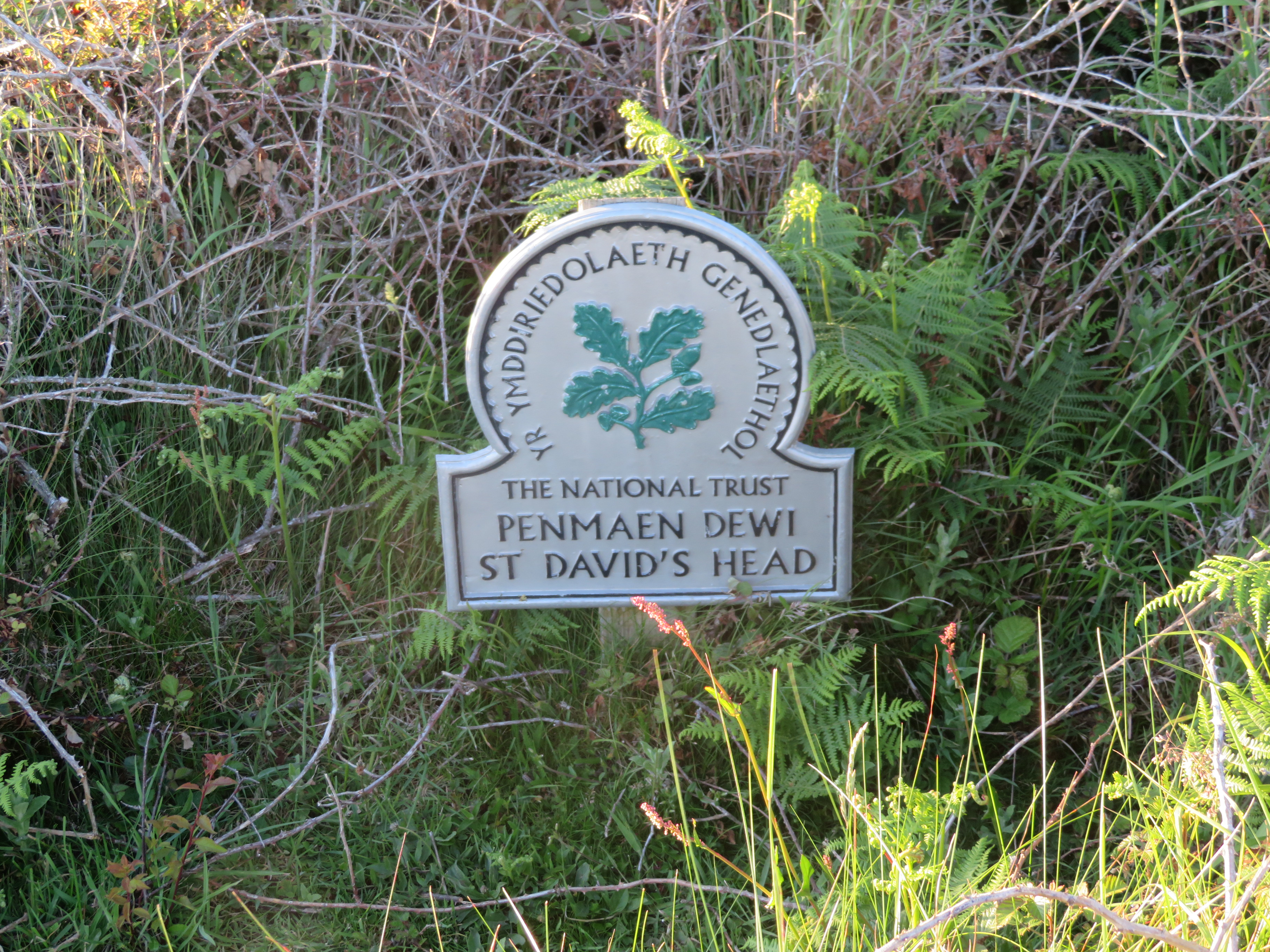
National Trust sign on Penmaen Dewi
