= St Davids =

Cathedral city in Pembrokeshire, Wales

Coordinates: 51.882°N 5.269°W

St Davids: Welsh: Tyddewi
- City
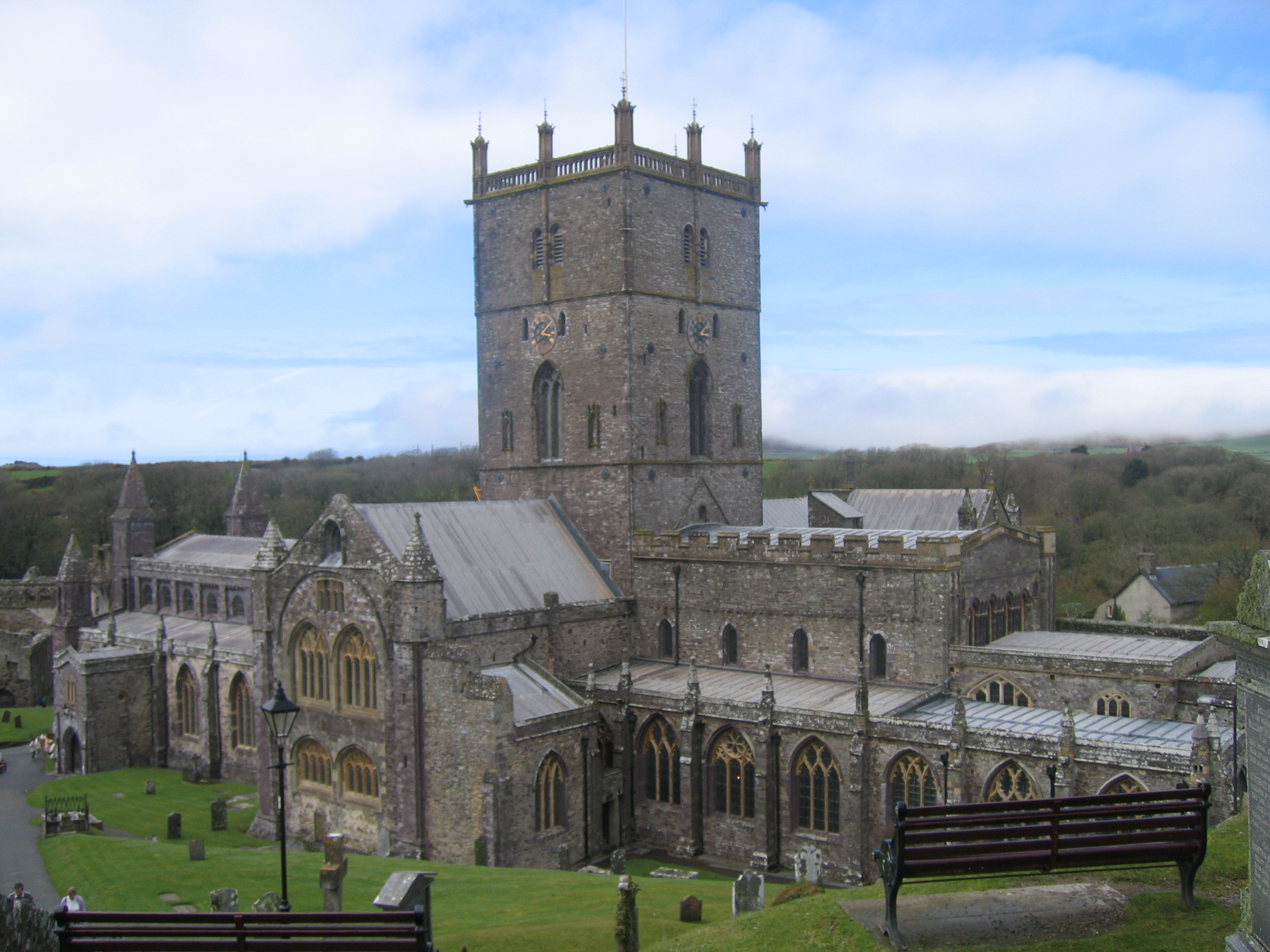
- St Davids Cathedral

- Location within Pembrokeshire
- Interactive map of St Davids
- Area: 17.96 sq mi (46.5 km^{2}) (community); 0.30 sq mi (0.78 km^{2}) (urban area)
- Population: 1,751 (2021) (community)
  - Density: 97/sq mi (37/km^{2})
- OS grid reference: SM755255
  - Cardiff: 90 mi (140 km)
  - London: 220 mi (350 km)
- Community: St Davids and the Cathedral Close
- Principal area: Pembrokeshire
- Preserved county: Dyfed
- Country: Wales
- Sovereign state: United Kingdom
- Post town: HAVERFORDWEST
- Postcode district: SA62
- Dialling code: 01437
- Police: Dyfed-Powys
- Fire: Mid and West Wales
- Ambulance: Welsh
- UK Parliament: Mid and South Pembrokeshire
- Senedd Cymru – Welsh Parliament: Ceredigion Penfro
- Website: stdavids.gov.uk

St Davids or St David's (Welsh: Tyddewi, [tiː ˈðɛwi], lit. "David's house") is a cathedral city in Pembrokeshire, Wales. It lies on the River Alun and is part of the community of St Davids and the Cathedral Close. It is the resting place of Saint David, Wales's patron saint, and named after him.

St Davids is the United Kingdom's smallest city by population (number of residents within the wider community was 1,751 in 2021) and urban area, but it is not the smallest city by local authority boundary area (which is the City of London). St Davids was given city status in the 12th century. This does not derive automatically, but in England and Wales was traditionally given to cathedral towns under practices laid down in the early 1540s, when Henry VIII founded dioceses. City status was lost in 1886, but restored in 1994 at the request of Queen Elizabeth II.

== History ==
=== Early history ===
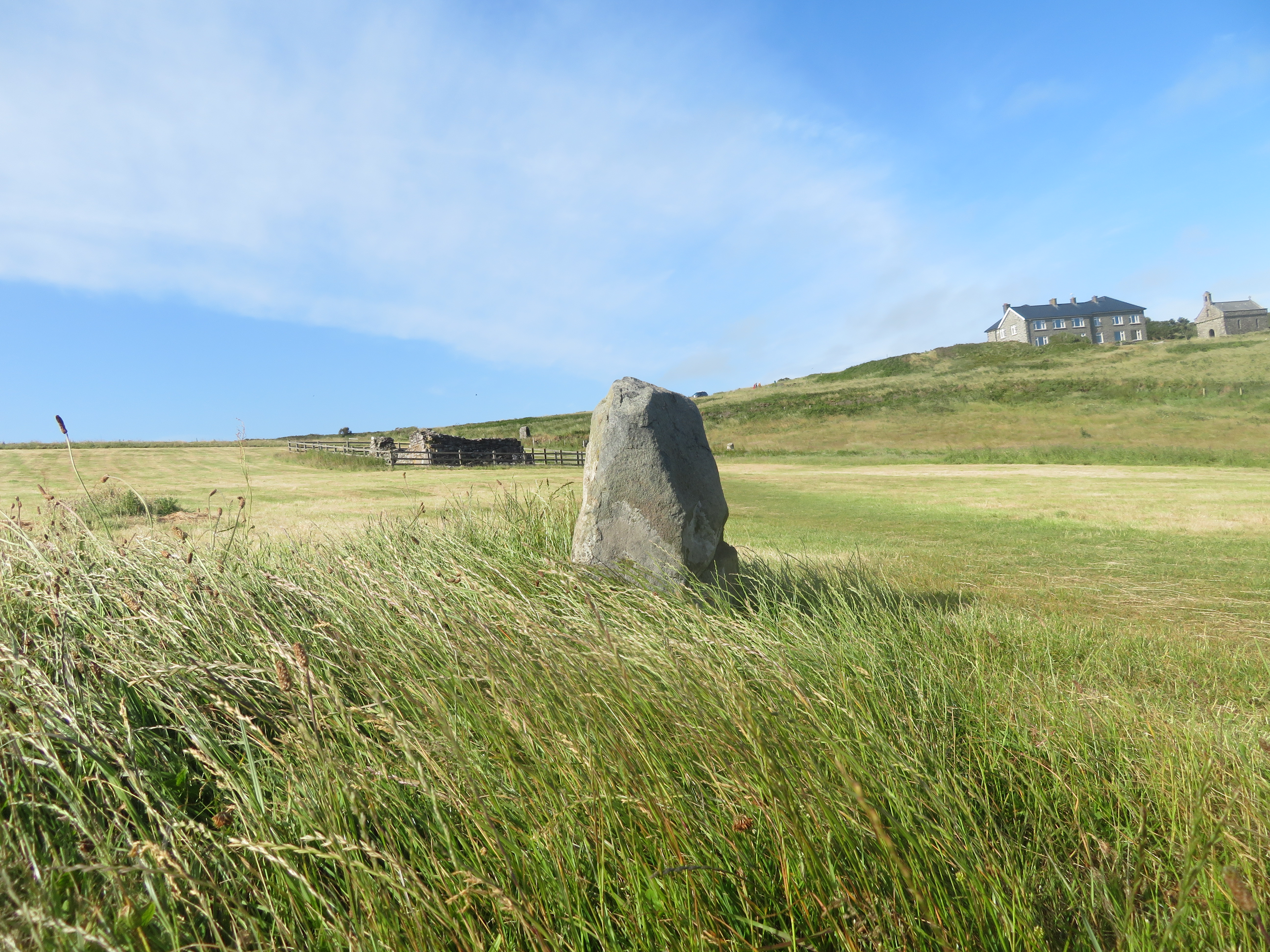
The landscape around St Davids is scattered with ancient monuments, such as this Menhir near St Non's chapel.

Although the surrounding landscape is home to a number of Palaeolithic, Bronze Age and Iron Age sites, documentary and archaeological evidence suggests that Pembrokeshire was not heavily occupied by the Romans. Following the Roman withdrawal from Britain, the area that would become St Davids was known in Ecclesiastical Latin as Meneva or Menevia and in Welsh as Mynyw. Some medieval texts state that the area was home to a cell, church or monastery founded by Saint Patrick around the year 470 AD, years before the birth of Saint David.

=== Age of David ===
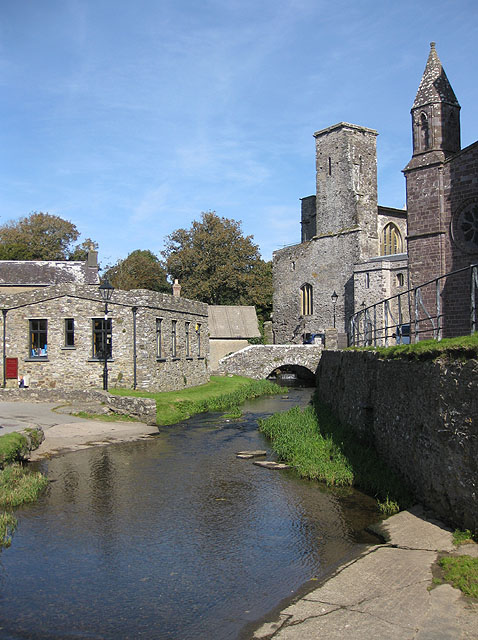
The Afon Alun in modern times, where Saint David founded his church and monastery

David is said to have been born to Saint Non around 500 AD, at the place where the Chapel of St Non now stands. He was baptised by Saint Elvis at Porthclais, and was brought up by his mother at Llanon. He may also have been educated at the "Ty Gwyn", Whitesands by Saint Paulinus. David is thought to have founded an earlier community somewhere to the west of modern St Davids, before establishing a new church and monastery at a place then known as "Glyn Rhosyn" on the banks of the Afon Alun (where the current Cathedral now stands).

During his life, David gained great fame throughout the Celtic church and was a key figure in the fight against the Pelagian Heresy. At the Synod of Brefi in 545 AD, Saint Dubricius (who held two Bishoprics, Caerleon and Llandaff) is said to have freely given David the ancient Metropolitan See of Caerleon. It is also implied that in transferring the See from Caerleon, David also transferred an important royal court. The Welsh Triads name "Mynyw" as the seat of "one of the three Tribal Thrones of the island of Britain" (the other courts being Celliwig and Pen Rhionydd). The entry states that the court had Arthur as Chief Prince, "Dewi" as the Chief Bishop, and "Maelgwn Gwynedd" as Chief Elder. Indeed, Geoffrey of Monmouth would describe David as "The pious archbishop of Legions, at the city of Menevia" (Caerleon's name in both Welsh and Latin means "The city of Legions").

=== Medieval pilgrim site ===
The monastery would become known as Tyddewi (House of David) and was a famous centre of pilgrimage early in its history, attracting both foreign pilgrims of status and numerous Viking attacks by the ninth century. Its scholastic community was also famous throughout the Celtic world and in Anglo-Saxon England. When Alfred the Great wanted to establish a centre of learning at his court, he requested Asserius Menevensis, (Asser of St Davids) to join them. At that time, Asser had lived all his life at St Davids, being raised, tonsured, trained and ordained there. Yet Alfred's desire to secure his service was such that he acquiesced to a number of delays and requests before finally agreeing that Asser could split his time between Alfred's court and St David's.

The cult of Saint David was actively encouraged by the cathedral's pre-Norman Bishops, especially Sulien and Rhigyfarch, who would write Vita sancti Davidis episcopi, the standard Vita of the saint.

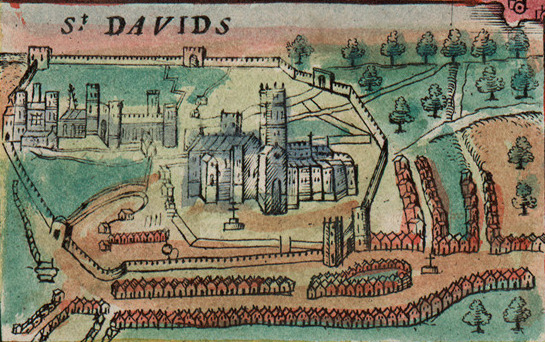
St Davids depicted on Speed's 1610 map of Wales

As the Normans advanced into Pembrokeshire, the city became a marcher borough, and the new hundred was named "Dewisland". The cathedral was rebuilt during the Norman era and much of the earliest sections that are still extant, date back to the twelfth century. However, it is thought that this cathedral would have followed the layout of medieval structure and it continued to host its many ancient relics, including the remains of David.

At its height, the city was visited by many pilgrims, including noblemen and kings such as William the Conqueror in 1081, Henry II in 1171, and Edward I and Queen Eleanor in 1284. Pope Calixtus II decreed that two pilgrimages to St Davids were equivalent to one to Rome ("Roma semel quantum dat bis Menevia tantum"). The monastery became a Cathedral in the twelfth Century. This allowed a vast income to be raised from visiting pilgrims in the Middle Ages.

=== Decline ===
The Reformation saw both the income and importance of St Davids begin to fade as pilgrimages fell out of favour; this was exacerbated by the appointment of a number of English Bishops who were seemingly less concerned with the welfare of the cathedral or the city. Perhaps most infamously, Bishop William Barlow sold the lead from the roof of the Bishop's Palace in 1536, beginning a long period of neglect for St Davids.

Barlow had the Bishop's chief residence moved to Abergwili, Carmarthenshire in 1542 and St Davids continued to decline. In 1603, the antiquarian George Owen described the city as one of five Pembrokeshire boroughs overseen by a portreeve. The seventeenth century, saw two separate bishops apply for licences to demolish some of the city's ancient buildings, and the Bishop's palace was now considered "beyond repair".

By the 19th century, only the Cathedral itself seemed to retain the city's former glory, as described in the Penny Cyclopaedia:

At present its appearance is that of a poor village, the houses, excepting those of the clergy, being in a ruinous state. The locality is lonely, and the neighbouring district wild and unimproved; but it is still an interesting place as the seat of a large episcopal see, with a fine cathedral and the remains of other magnificent religious edifices.

=== Modern city ===
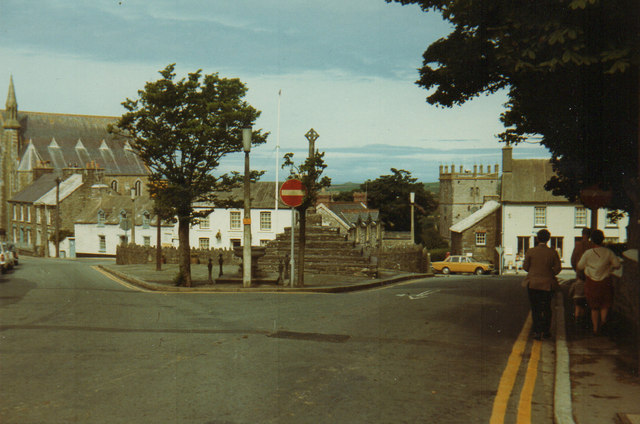
Cross Square, St Davids in 1971

The unique nature of the cathedral and the city was evident as late as the twentieth century. Following the disestablishment of the Church in Wales in 1920, the Cathedral Close was allowed to operate as its own civil parish, separate from that of the adjacent city for the next 50 years.

With better transport links and the advent of tourism, the city prospered once more in the later twentieth century, with the city's 210 listed buildings making it a destination for walkers, tourists and modern pilgrims. Many of the ancient buildings, including the Bishop's Palace, are today maintained by Cadw and open to the public.

== Geography ==
Map of St. Davids in Pembrokeshire, Wales, demonstrating the size of the settlement, compared to its wider city boundary. Also indicated are isolated hamlets and offshore islands. Community/city boundaries Main settlement area

The community council area sits at the southern end of the Irish Sea on a peninsula, between Cardigan Bay, St George's Channel and St Brides Bay. It covers not just the mainland area, but also several islands off the coast, of which Ramsey Island is the largest and the only one inhabited, separated by the Ramsey Sound. The most westerly mainland point of Wales is at Pen Dal-aderyn. To the north lie Whitesands Bay and St Davids Head, which are locally notable landscape features. The community includes the former chapelries at St Justinian and Gwrhyd. The mainland contains much area used for farming, but contains very small scattered residences and several campsites.

St Davids Lifeboat Station, at St Justinian, has saved an estimated 360 people since the first lifeboat was located there in 1869; four lifeboatmen have died while saving others. The Irish Sea includes a large number of offshore rocks and islands and is notorious for strong tides. The entire coastline around St Davids forms part of the Pembrokeshire Coast National Park. Saint Non's Well overlooks the Pembrokeshire Coast Path and St Brides Bay. St David's Airfield, although named after the city when opened in 1943, is in the neighbouring community of Solva. The highest point is Carn Llidi at 181 metres (594 ft).

== City status ==
In the 16th century, a town was recognised as a city by the English Crown if it had a diocesan cathedral within its limits, along with a royal charter or borough privileges. This link was abolished in 1888, and amid prior borough reorganisation (see Governance below), St Davids lost the right to call itself a city. In 1991, St Davids town council proposed that a case for city status, which the residents had long considered it to have anyway, should be promoted in connection with the 40th anniversary of the coronation of Queen Elizabeth II, and in 1992 the Home Office agreed to refer the matter to Buckingham Palace. In 1994, at the Queen's request, St Davids was again granted city status along with the Northern Irish town of Armagh, "in recognition of their important Christian heritage and their status as cities in the last century". The letters patent conferring city status were issued on 16 September 1994. The following year the Queen visited to formally present the letters patent in a ceremony at St Davids Cathedral on 1 June 1995.

The award of city status is typically granted to a local authority, whose administrative area is then considered to be the formal borders of the city. By this definition, the whole community area of St Davids and the Cathedral Close, including the settlement of St Davids, its surrounding rural area, and islands off the coast, is considered to be within the city. St Davids contains the lowest population of all the cities of the UK, and has the smallest urban area, at 0.23 sq mi (0.60 km^{2}). However, with the formal city area defined by its community council extent of 17.93 sq mi (46.4 km^{2}), this sizeable expanse including offshore islands mean that several UK cities are smaller in area, with the City of London being the smallest at 1.12 sq mi (2.9 km^{2}). In Wales, St Davids is the third smallest after the community areas of St Asaph with 2.49 sq mi (6.4 km^{2}) and Bangor with 2.79 sq mi (7.2 km^{2}).

== Governance ==
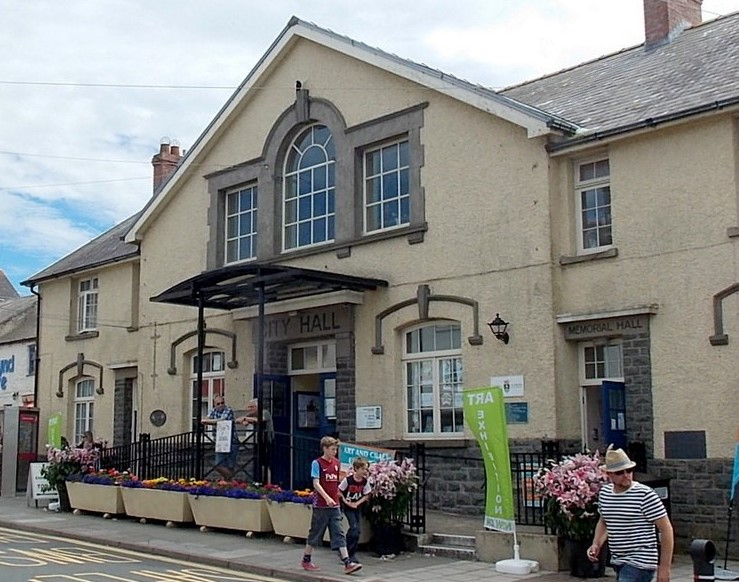
St Davids City Hall

St Davids became a borough in 1115, when Bernard, the first Norman Bishop of St Davids, was granted a charter by Henry I designating the lands of Dewisland as a Marcher Lordship.

This gave Bernard wide-reaching powers over this realm, with his headquarters remaining initially at St Davids. However, subsequent Marcher Bishops came to base the administration of Dewisland, including the exchequer, chancery and court, in Llawhaden by the 13th century. King Henry VIII then passed the Laws in Wales Acts, which in 1535 and 1542 abolished the status of Marcher Lordships. Dewisland was merged with the adjacent Lordship of Kemes and the surrounding Lordship of Pembroke to form Pembrokeshire, of which Dewisland became a hundred. In 1835 a report from government commissioners investigating municipal corporations determined:

THE city and parish of St. David's is situate in the manor of Dewisland. The Bishop of St. David's is Lord of the manor; and it appears that an officer, called the mayor, is annually appointed by the steward, whose duty is to collect certain chief rents to the bishop. The mayor assumes to take certain small tolls by virtue of his office: his right to do this is disputed, but the tolls being very trifling, are frequently paid. The mayor is merely an officer of the Manor Court. A belief exists amongst some of the inhabitants that the city was once a corporation; but there are no burgesses, charter, or other vestige of municipal institutions. The belief has probably arisen from the lord's officer being called a mayor.

Under this summary, the borough was considered within the report as "municipal in name only", and non-parliamentary. Any remaining legalities pertaining to the city were removed in 1886, when these were abolished by the Municipal Corporations Act 1883, with its corporation deemed to be long extinct, and the very small population (1,025 residents in 1835) not helping its cause in an age where boroughs with unrepresentative populations were being singled out for reform. This act, in turn, appears to have caused the loss of city status, as there was no corporate body available to petition for a renewal of its charter. The subsequent renewal of the status in 1994 (see City Status above) and the reasons then given conclude that the status was in place until 1886.

The borough lay across two parishes, and by the time of the creation of registration districts in 1837 these were: the Cathedral Close of St. David's – the close surrounding the cathedral and associated church buildings; and St Davids – the rest of the city and rural areas. These were split from the church into civil parishes during 1866, electing secular councillors from 1894, converted to Welsh community administrative areas in 1974, and merged in 1987 to form the present day St Davids and the Cathedral Close.

St Davids City Council is the community council body, which has twelve councillors. The City Council employs one City Clerk and one Financial Officer. In June 2020 the council elected its first Sikh mayor, Councillor Bira Sehmi, believed also to be the first Sikh mayor in Wales. The council is based at St Davids City Hall on High Street, which was completed in 1924.

The parishes were part of Haverfordwest rural sanitary district from 1872, and when parish and district councils were established in 1894 the two parishes were included in the Haverfordwest Rural District. In 1974 the two parishes were changed into communities and placed in Preseli district. Preseli was abolished in 1996 under further local government reform and the city presently comes under Pembrokeshire County Council for all principal government services.

The electoral ward of St Davids elects a county councillor to Pembrokeshire County Council.

== Culture ==
=== Arts ===
The Flag of Saint David (Baner Dewi Sant)

The city hosted the National Eisteddfod in 2002. The Archbishop-designate of Canterbury, Dr Rowan Williams, was inducted into the Gorsedd of Bards, a historic order of Druids.

=== Charity ===
The St Davids Penknife Club is a group of people dedicated to voluntary fund raising for local groups and charities.

=== Sport ===
St Davids has a rugby union club, St. Davids RFC, which competes in the Welsh Rugby Union League West.

=== Tourism ===
In addition to the cathedral and 210 other listed ancient buildings and structures, notable features of the city and community include the 14th-century Tower Gate, the Celtic Old Cross and a number of art galleries. St Davids is also a base for walking and water sports. In 2019 Consumers' Association members placed St Davids in the top three best value beach destinations in Britain. Whitesands Bay, about two miles (three kilometres) west of St Davids, is a popular water sports resort. It has been described as the best surfing beach in Pembrokeshire and among the best tourist beaches in the world.

=== Media ===
Television signals are received from the Preseli TV transmitter and the local relay transmitter situated west of the city.

Radio stations are provided by BBC Radio Wales on 95.9 FM which broadcast the local opt-out from its studios in Carmarthen. Other radio stations including Heart South Wales on 105.7 FM, Nation Radio, and Pure West Radio, a Pembrokeshire-based community radio station which broadcasts on-line and on DAB.

The city is served by the Haverfordwest-based newspaper, Western Telegraph.

== Education ==
Ysgol Dewi Sant (St David's School) is the local secondary school covering years 7–13 (aged 11–18). Ysgol Bro Dewi (Dewisland School) is a Voluntary Controlled Primary School, with pupils from Reception to Year 6.

== Transport ==
The A487 road's only non-primary section, between Fishguard and Haverfordwest, passes through St Davids. Heading southwest from Fishguard, the A487 makes a sharp turn at St Davids, directing travellers eastwards toward Haverfordwest. TrawsCymru Connect route T11 operates eight times a day along this section of A487. There are also seasonal coastal bus services along the St. David's Peninsula, running 7 days a week between 23 May and 27 September.

== Notable people ==
The following were born in St Davids:

- Asser (died c. 909), a monk at St Davids who was mentor to King Alfred the Great and wrote his biography.
- William Barlow (died 1625), an expert on magnetism and Anglican cleric whose father, also William Barlow, served as bishop in 1536–1548.
- Thomas Tomkins (1572–1656), a musician and composer.
- Richard Fenton (1747–1821), a Welsh lawyer, topographer and poet.
- Henry Hicks (1837–1899), a surgeon and geologist who practised there from 1862 until 1871.
- Wilfrith Green (1872–1937), a brigadier-general who served in the British and Indian armies
- Mary Keir (1912–2024), Welsh supercentenarian.
- Kieran Evans (born 1969), a film director and screenwriter.

=== Sport ===
- Ian Walsh (born 1958), a Wales national association football player.
- Rowland Phillips (born 1965), a rugby union player for Wales and later rugby league for Wales and Great Britain.
- Jo Price (born 1985), a Welsh rugby union player and former footballer.
- Jasmine Joyce (born 1995), a player for Wales women's national rugby union sevens and the British women's sevens team at the 2016 Summer Olympics.

== Twin towns ==
St Davids is twinned with:

- Naas, Ireland
- Orléat, France
- Matsieng, Lesotho

== See also ==
- Chapel of St Non
- Annales Cambriae
- Bishop of St Davids
- Diocese of St Davids
- City status in the United Kingdom
- Roman Catholic Diocese of Menevia
