= Monastery of Saint David, Wales =

Coordinates: 51°52′55″N 5°16′06″W

The Monastery of Saint David was a monastery in the current day St Davids in Pembrokeshire. It was founded by the patron saint of Wales, Saint David. It was on the site of the current St Davids Cathedral.

David is thought to have founded a new church and monastery at a place then known as "Glyn Rhosyn" on the banks of the Afon Alun. The monastery would become known as Tyddewi (House of David) and was a famous centre of pilgrimage early in its history, attracting both foreign pilgrims of status and numerous Viking attacks by the ninth century.

The scholastic community was famous throughout the Celtic world and in Anglo-Saxon England. When Alfred the Great wanted to establish a centre of learning at his court, he requested Asserius Menevensis, (Asser of St Davids) to join them. At that time, Asser had lived all his life at St Davids, being raised, tonsured, trained and ordained there. Yet Alfred's desire to secure his service was such that he acquiesced to a number of delays and requests before finally agreeing that Asser could split his time between Alfred's court and St David's.

The Monastic Rule of David prescribed that monks had to pull the plough themselves without draught animals, and must drink only water and eat only bread with salt and herbs. The monks spent their evenings in prayer, reading and writing. No personal possessions were allowed: even to say "my book" was considered an offence. David lived a simple life and practised asceticism, teaching his followers to refrain from eating meat and drinking beer.
