= List of shipwrecks in May 1847 =

The list of shipwrecks in May 1847 includes ships sunk, foundered, wrecked, grounded, or otherwise lost during May 1847.

== 1 May ==
List of shipwrecks: 1 May 1847
Ship	State	Description
Betsey	United Kingdom	The schooner was driven ashore in the Dardanelles. She was refloated on 5 May.
Dorothea	United Kingdom	The ship was wrecked in the Auckland Channel. She was on a voyage from Bombay, India to Liverpool, Lancashire.
Ellen Cook	United Kingdom	The ship was abandoned in the North Sea. Her crew were rescued by Dorothea (United Kingdom).
John Dutson	United Kingdom	The ship ran aground and was damaged in the Hooghly River. She was on a voyage from Liverpool to Calcutta, India. She was refloated.
Louisa	United Kingdom	The ship sank in Ramsey Sound. She was on a voyage from Milford Haven to Fishguard, Pembrokeshire. She was refloated on 8 May and taken in to Porthclais.

== 2 May ==
List of shipwrecks: 2 May 1847
Ship	State	Description
Barossa	United Kingdom	The ship ran aground and was damaged off the Packerort Lighthouse, Russia. She was on a voyage from Leith, Lothian to Reval, Russia.

== 3 May ==
List of shipwrecks: 3 May 1847
Ship	State	Description
Alexandrina	United Kingdom	The ship ran aground on the South Gar, in the North Sea off the mouth of the River Tees. She was refloated and taken in to Cargo Fleet, Yorkshire in a leaky condition.
Cygnet	United Kingdom	The ship was driven ashore at Money Point, County Clare. She was later refloated.
Edwin	United Kingdom	The ship ran aground on the Crawford Reef. She was on a voyage from Liverpool, Lancashire to Havana, Cuba.
Model	United Kingdom	The ship was driven ashore at Margate, Kent. She was on a voyage from London to Plymouth, Devon.

== 4 May ==
List of shipwrecks: 4 May 1847
Ship	State	Description
L'Amazone	France	The ship was wrecked at Jamaica. She was on a voyage from Martinique to Savannah, Georgia, United States.
Palladium	France	The ship was destroyed by fire in the Atlantic Ocean (23°52′S 25°50′W). She was on a voyage from Nantes, Loire-Inférieure to Île Bourbon.

== 5 May ==
List of shipwrecks: 5 May 1847
Ship	State	Description
Aram	United Kingdom	The steamship ran aground at Çanakkale, Ottoman Empire. She was on a voyage from Constantinople, Ottoman Empire to London. She was refloated and resumed her voyage.
David	United Kingdom	The ship collided with a Norwegian ship and foundered 20 nautical miles (37 km) off Ystad, Sweden with the loss of two of her crew. She was on a voyage from Ipswich, Suffolk to Riga, Russia.
Kitty	United Kingdom	The ship was driven ashore at Matanzas, Cuba. Her crew were rescued. She was on a voyage from Aberdeen to New Orleans, Louisiana, United States.

== 6 May ==
List of shipwrecks: 6 May 1847
Ship	State	Description
Christine Anna	(United Kingdom of Great Britain and Ireland) British North America	The ship capsized in the Atlantic Ocean. Her crew were rescued on 9 May by the barque Amanda (United Kingdom). Christine Anna was on a voyage from New York, United States to Liverpool, Lancashire.
Eulalia	Spain	The ship struck an iceberg and sank in the Atlantic Ocean with the loss of nineteen lives. Survivors were rescued by Newport (United Kingdom). Eulalia was on a voyage from Havana, Cuba to San Sebastián.
Fancy	United Kingdom	The ship was wrecked on the Elbow End Bank, in the North Sea off the mouth of the River Tay with the loss of one of her four crew. Survivors were rescued by Broughty Ferry fishermen.
Goddens	United Kingdom	The ship ran aground on the Lapsand.
Penguin	United Kingdom	The ship was lost off "Realijo".
Rebecca and Elizabeth	United Kingdom	The ship was driven ashore at Plasnewydd. She was on a voyage from Liverpool, Lancashire to Barmouth, Caernarfonshire. She was refloated on 11 May.

== 7 May ==
List of shipwrecks: 7 May 1847
Ship	State	Description
Amitie	Belgium	The brig was driven ashore near Ystad, Sweden. She was on a voyage from Memel, Prussia to Antwerp.

== 8 May ==
List of shipwrecks: 8 May 1847
Ship	State	Description
Anglo Saxon	United States	The ship was wrecked on Duck Island, Newfoundland, British North America. All 60 people on board were rescued. She was on a voyage from Boston, Massachusetts to Liverpool, Lancashire, United Kingdom.
Mary and Catherine	United Kingdom	The ship ran aground on the Lapsand. She was on a voyage from Copenhagen, Denmark to London. She was refloated on 10 May and taken in to Helsingør, Denmark.

== 9 May ==
List of shipwrecks: 9 May 1847
Ship	State	Description
Agenoria	United Kingdom	The ship ran aground at Bridlington, Yorkshire. She was on a voyage from Sunderland, County Durham to Southampton, Hampshire.

== 10 May ==
List of shipwrecks: 10 May 1847
Ship	State	Description
Bachelor	United Kingdom	The ship ran aground in the James River. She was on a voyage from Richmond, Virginia to an Irish port.
Jane Alison	(United Kingdom of Great Britain and Ireland) British North America	The ship struck the Halftide Rock and sank off Eastport, Maine, United States.
Louisa Campbell	(United Kingdom of Great Britain and Ireland) New Zealand	The barque ran aground and broke up on a sandbank near Farewell Spit, New Zealand, en route from Auckland to Nelson. All on board were resched.

== 11 May ==
List of shipwrecks: 11 May 1847
Ship	State	Description
Charlotte	(United Kingdom of Great Britain and Ireland) British North America	The ship was driven ashore near Aveiro, Portugal.
Columbian Packet	United States	The ship was driven ashore on Sharps Island, Maryland. She was on a voyage from Baltimore, Maryland to the Clyde. She had been refloated on 16 May and put back to Baltimore.
Phoenix	United Kingdom	The tug sank in the River Trent. She was raised on 17 May.

== 12 May ==
List of shipwrecks: 12 May 1847
Ship	State	Description
Alkanna Elizabeth	Netherlands	The ship was driven ashore on the south coast of Bornholm, Denmark. She was on a voyage from Amsterdam, North Holland to Saint Petersburg, Russia. She was refloated and taken in to Rønne, Denmark.
Young Queen	United Kingdom	The brig ran aground on a shoal off Cape Lookout, South Carolina, United States and was abandoned by her crew. She subsequently floated off. She was taken in to Wilmington, Delaware, United States on 21 May in a derelict condition.

== 13 May ==
List of shipwrecks: 13 May 1847
Ship	State	Description
Altnoskeach	United Kingdom	The sloop capsized off the mouth of the River Tay with the loss of her captain. At least one of the other five crew members survived.
Bosphorus	United Kingdom	The barque ran aground on the Diamond Rock, off Gibraltar. she was refloated.
Grand Turk	United Kingdom	The ship was wrecked near the Cape Henry Lighthouse, Virginia, United States. Her crew were rescued. She was on a voyage from Baltimore, Maryland to Londonderry.
John Geddes	(United Kingdom of Great Britain and Ireland) British North America	The full-rigged ship was driven ashore near Matane, Province of Canada. She was on a voyage from Pictou, Nova Scotia to Quebec City, Province of Canada. She was consequently condemned.
Malvina	Russia	The ship was collided with Mariner (United Kingdom and foundered in the Atlantic Ocean. She was on a voyage from Matanzas, Cuba to Cowes, Isle of Wight, United Kingdom.
Nancy Munro	United Kingdom	The ship was wrecked on the Second Breas Rocks, off Trinidad.
Thorwald	Denmark	The ship ran aground on the Seskar Reef. She was on a voyage from Málaga, Spain to Saint Petersburg, Russia. She was refloated on 17 May and completed her voyage.

== 14 May ==
List of shipwrecks: 14 May 1847
Ship	State	Description
Alliance	Prussia	The schooner was driven ashore at the Reval Lighthouse, Russia. She was on a voyage from Danzig to Saint Petersburg, Russia. She was refloated and taken in to "Baltic Port".
Baboo	United Kingdom	The barque ran aground and was severely damaged in the River Thames at Limehouse, Middlesex consequent to an argument as to whether she should be towed by tugs Lion or Newcastle (both United Kingdom). Baboo was on a voyage from London to Sydney, New South Wales. She was refloated and put back to London.
Minerva	Norway	The ship was driven ashore and wrecked at Randers. She was on a voyage from Arendal to Sundsvall.

== 15 May ==
List of shipwrecks: 15 May 1847
Ship	State	Description
Endeavour	United Kingdom	The ship was driven ashore and sank at "Kjobstad", Denmark. She was on a voyage from Liverpool, Lancashire to Narva, Russia.
Gem	United Kingdom	The ship was abandoned in the Atlantic Ocean. Her crew were rescued by Blanche (United Kingdom). Gem was on a voyage from Sunderland, County Durham to Quebec City, Province of Canada, British North America.
Mary Clark	United Kingdom	The ship ran aground on the Skagen Reef. She was on a voyage from Liverpool to Saint Petersburg, Russia. She was refloated and resumed her voyage.

== 16 May ==
List of shipwrecks: 16 May 1847
Ship	State	Description
Hopewell	United Kingdom	The ship was wrecked on the Gunfleet Sand, in the North Sea off the coast of Essex. Her crew were rescued. She was on a voyage from London to Amsterdam, North Holland, Netherlands.
Horta	United Kingdom	The barque was driven ashore near Hjørring, Denmark. She was on a voyage from Newcastle upon Tyne, Northumberland to Saint Petersburg, Russia. She was refloated and resumed her voyage.
Margaretha Dorothea	Flag unknown	The ship was driven ashore near Hjørring. She was on a voyage from Hartlepool, County Durham, United Kingdom to "Holbeck".
Messenger	United Kingdom	The ship was holed by ice and sank off "Summers Island". Her crew were rescued.
Port Leon	United States	The brig was wrecked on Bold Cape, Massachusetts. She was on a voyage from the Gambia Colony and Protectorate to New York.
Providence	United Kingdom	The ship ran aground and was wrecked on the Scheelhoek, in the North Sea off the Dutch coast. Her crew were rescued.
Reform	United Kingdom	The schooner foundered off Islay, Inner Hebrides with the loss of all hands. She was on a voyage from Glasgow, Renfrewshire to a port in the West Highlands.
Thomas and Francis	United Kingdom	The ship ran aground off Alderney, Channel Islands. She was on a voyage from Cardiff, Glamorgan to Alderney. She was refloated.

== 17 May ==
List of shipwrecks: 17 May 1847
Ship	State	Description
Leander	United Kingdom	The ship was abandoned in the Atlantic Ocean. Her crew were rescued.
Neptune	United Kingdom	The ship was driven ashore near Gravelines, Nord, France. She was on a voyage from South Shields, County Durham to Bordeaux, Gironde, France. She was refloated and taken in to Gravelines.
Oceanus	United Kingdom	The ship was holed by ice and sank off Hogland, Russia. Her crew were rescued.
HNLMS Prins van Oranje	Royal Netherlands Navy	The frigate was driven ashore at the Rammekens Castle, Zeeland.

== 18 May ==
List of shipwrecks: 18 May 1847
Ship	State	Description
Magnet	United Kingdom	The ship was driven ashore by ice at the Tollbeacon. She was on a voyage from Newcastle upon Tyne, Northumberland to Saint Petersburg, Russia. She was refloated and taken in to Kronstadt, Russia.
Nantais	France	The ship was driven ashore near Lyngvig, Denmark. Her crew were rescued.
Tay	United Kingdom	The ship was driven ashore near Helsingør, Denmark. She was on a voyage from Sunderland, County Durham to Pillau, Prussia. She was refloated the next day and resumed her voyage.
Westmoreland	United Kingdom	The ship was driven ashore near "Tor", Egypt.

== 19 May ==
List of shipwrecks: 19 May 1847
Ship	State	Description
Acadian	United Kingdom	The ship was wrecked at Whitehead, Nova Scotia, British North America. Her crew were rescued. She was on a voyage from Glasgow, Renfrewshire to Halifax, Nova Scotia.
Achiever	United Kingdom	The ship was wrecked on the Porto Genado Reef, off Nuevitas, Cuba. She was on a voyage from Liverpool, Lancashire to Havana, Cuba.
Brothers	United Kingdom	The ship was lost 60 nautical miles (110 km) south of the Magdalen Islands, Nova Scotia, British North America with the loss of all hands.
Carricks	United Kingdom	The brig was wrecked in British North American waters 4 miles east of Cape Rosier with the loss of 120 to 178 lives. All the crew but one boy was saved, while only 48 of 167 passengers reached shore. She was on a voyage from Sligo to Quebec City, Province of Canada, British North America.
Exquisite	United Kingdom	The ship was driven ashore and damaged by ice at the Tollbeacon. She was on a voyage from Sunderland, County Durham to Kronstadt, Russia.
Hero	United Kingdom	The steamship foundered in The Steene. Her crew were rescued. She was on a voyage from Newcastle upon Tyne, Northumberland to Saint Petersburg, Russia.
Maxwell	United Kingdom	The ship was holed by ice and sank off Seskar, Russia. Her crew were rescued.
Miracle	United Kingdom	The ship was wrecked in the Magdalen Islands with the loss of 64 or 68 of her 408 passengers. Her crew survived. She was on a voyage from Liverpool, Lancashire to Quebec City, Province of Canada, British North America.
Port Leon	United States	The brig was wrecked on "Bold Cape". She was on a voyage from the Gambia Colony and Protectorate to New York.
Rory O'Moore	United Kingdom	The barque was wrecked at Petit-Métis, Province of Canada. Her crew survived. She was on a voyage from Liverpool to Quebec City.

== 20 May ==
List of shipwrecks: 20 May 1847
Ship	State	Description
Caledonia	United Kingdom	The ship ran aground at Charleston, South Carolina, United States. She was on a voyage from Charleston to Liverpool, Lancashire. She was refloated and put in to the Hampton Roads in a leaky condition.
Imogen	United Kingdom	The ship was wrecked off Scattery Island, County Clare. All on board, 175 passengers plus her crew, were rescued.
Málaga	Spain	The steamship was driven ashore 3 nautical miles (5.6 km) east of Gibraltar. She was on a voyage from Málaga to Cádiz. She was refloated the next day with assistance from HMS Virago (Royal Navy) and resumed her voyage.
Sophie	France	The ship was wrecked at Pénerf, Morbihan. She was on a voyage from Bordeaux, Gironde to Dunkirk, Nord.
Strahl	Belgium	The ship was driven ashore at Rattendyk. She was on a voyage from Antwerp to Saint Petersburg, Russia.
Syren	United Kingdom	The barque was driven ashore and wrecked at La Guaira, Venezuela. She was on a voyage from La Guaira to Liverpool, Lancashire.

== 21 May ==
List of shipwrecks: 21 May 1847
Ship	State	Description
Jacob	United Kingdom	The ship capsized and sank in the River Thames at Erith, Kent.
John and Jessie	United Kingdom	The ship was driven ashore at Worthingle Point, Sussex. She was on a voyage from London to Livorno, Grand Duchy of Tuscany. She was refloated and resumed her voyage.
Petrel	(United Kingdom of Great Britain and Ireland) Saint Vincent	The droghing schooner was driven ashore and wrecked on Saint Vincent.
Speculator	(United Kingdom of Great Britain and Ireland) Guernsey	The ship ran aground on the Shipwash Sand, in the North Sea off the coast of Essex. She was refloated on 23 May and taken in to Harwich, Essex.
Yorkshire	United Kingdom	The ship was driven ashore near "Port Hindley", Lancashire. She was on a voyage from Liverpool to Quebec City, Province of Canada, British North America. She was refloated and put back to Liverpool.

== 22 May ==
List of shipwrecks: 22 May 1847
Ship	State	Description
Alexander	United Kingdom	The whaler was reported to have foundered in the Pacific Ocean 600 nautical miles (1,100 km) off Cape Howe, New South Wales. Six people who claimed they were survivors reached Gabo Island in July. They were suspected to be escaped convicts.
Philadelphia	France	The ship sprang a leak and put in to Rio de Janeiro, Brazil in a sinking condition. She was on a voyage from Peru to Havre de Grâce, Seine-Inférieure. She was consequently condemned.

== 23 May ==
List of shipwrecks: 23 May 1847
Ship	State	Description
Fulmar	United Kingdom	The ship struck a rock between the mouth of the Guadiaro and Estepona, Spain and sank. She was on a voyage from Smyrna, Ottoman Empire to Liverpool, Lancashire.
Hooker	Netherlands	The ship ran aground on the Haisborough Sands, in the North Sea off the coast of Norfolk, United Kingdom. She was refloated.
Imogene	United Kingdom	The ship was wrecked at "Porto Nova", British North America. All on board were rescued. She was on a voyage from Liverpool, Lancashire to Quebec City, Province of Canada, British North America.
Jacob	United Kingdom	The ship capsized and sank in the River Thames at Erith, Kent.
Palmone	Norway	The ship was wrecked off Læsø, Denmark. Her crew were rescued. She was on a voyage from Christiansand to Odesa.

== 24 May ==
List of shipwrecks: 24 May 1847
Ship	State	Description
Glaucus	United Kingdom	The ship struck the Cabadello Rock, at the mouth of the Douro and sank.
Herald	United States	The ship was driven ashore and wrecked at Tankerness, Orkney Islands, United Kingdom. All on board, 112 passengers plus her crew, were rescued. She was on a voyage from Amsterdam, North Holland, Netherlands to Baltimore, Maryland.
Paragon	United Kingdom	The ship foundered in the Atlantic Ocean 100 nautical miles (190 km) north west of Barbados. Her crew survived. She was on a voyage from Berbice, British Guiana to the Clyde.
Percival	(United Kingdom of Great Britain and Ireland) British North America	The ship departed from Liverpool, Lancashire for Boston, Massachusetts. No further trace, presumed foundered with the loss of all hand.

== 26 May ==
List of shipwrecks: 26 May 1847
Ship	State	Description
Cantab	United Kingdom	The ship was wrecked at Varberg, Sweden. She was on a voyage from Dublin to Saint Petersburg, Russia.
Lochinvar	United Kingdom	The ship was driven ashore at Castrup, Denmark. She was on a voyage from Liverpool, Lancashire to Saint Petersburg, Russia. She was refloated on 28 May and taken in to Helsingør, Denmark.
Zenobia	United Kingdom	The ship was wrecked at Main-à-Dieu, Nova Scotia, British North America. All on board, over 300 people, were rescued.

== 27 May ==
List of shipwrecks: 27 May 1847
Ship	State	Description
François	France	The ship ran aground on the Goodwin Sands, Kent, United Kingdom. She was on a voyage from Dunkirk, Nord to South Shields, County Durham, United Kingdom. She was refloated and resumed her voyage.
Robertson	United Kingdom	The ship ran aground south of Mopoon Point, Burma. She was on a voyage from Moulmein, Burma to an English port. She was refloated and resumed her voyage.

== 30 May ==
List of shipwrecks: 30 May 1847
Ship	State	Description
Cyrene	United Kingdom	The barque was driven ashore at La Guaira, Venezuela. She was on a voyage from La Guaira to Liverpool, Lancashire. She was declared a total loss.
Skylark	(United Kingdom of Great Britain and Ireland) British North America	The ship was driven ashore on the Barbary Coast 14 nautical miles (26 km) east of Tangier, Morocco. She was on a voyage from Liverpool, Lancashire to Palermo, Sicily. She was refloated in mid-June and taken in to Gibraltar.

== 31 May ==
List of shipwrecks: 31 May 1847
Ship	State	Description
Twee Gebroeders	Hamburg	The ship sprang a leak and foundered off Ameland, Friesland, Netherlands. Her crew were rescued. She was on a voyage from Cuxhaven to London, United Kingdom.
Union	(United Kingdom of Great Britain and Ireland) British North America	The whaler struck a floating log and foundered. She was on a voyage from Halifa to Sydney, Nova Scotia.

== Unknown date ==
List of shipwrecks: Unknown date in May 1847
Ship	State	Description
Antoinette	France	The ship was abandoned off the mouth of the Gambia River before 1 June. She was taken in to Bathurst, Gambia Colony and Protectorate by Magellan (Belgium).
Astrea	United Kingdom	The ship was driven ashore near Scutari, Ottoman Empire. She was on a voyage from Newport, Monmouthshire to Constantinople, Ottoman Empire. She was later refloated.
Aztec	United States	The brigantine was abandoned in the Atlantic Ocean before 12 May.
Bonne Marie	Belgium	The ship foundered off Saint-Nazaire, Loire-Inférieure, France before 9 May.
Chanticleer	United Kingdom	The ship sprang a leak and ran aground in the Kowie River.
Crusader	(United Kingdom of Great Britain and Ireland) British North America	The ship was abandoned in the Atlantic Ocean before 7 May. She was on a voyage from Philadelphia, Pennsylvania to Liverpool, Lancashire.
Dervish	Ottoman Empire	The brig was abandoned at sea before 16 May. Twelve crew were rescued.
England's Queen	United Kingdom	The ship was wrecked on Saint Paul Island, Nova Scotia before 29 May. She was on a voyage from Liverpool, Lancashire to Quebec City, Province of Canada, British North America.
Enterprise	United Kingdom	The brig ran aground on the Herd Sand, in the North Sea off the coast of County Durham before 18 May. She was refloated on that day and towed in to the River Wear in a wrecked condition.
Flying Fish	(United Kingdom of Great Britain and Ireland) New South Wales	The ship was wrecked on the coast of New Zealand.
Frowning Beauty	United Kingdom	The ship ran aground in the Dardanelles before 27 May. She was refloated.
Garnet	United Kingdom	The brig collided with Fanny (United Kingdom and foundered in the Atlantic Ocean. Her crew were rescued.
Harriet	United Kingdom	The ship was holed by ice and sank off Seskar, Russia before 22 May. Her crew were rescued. She was on a voyage from Limerick to Saint Petersburg, Russia.
Hellespont	United Kingdom	The ship was abandoned in the Atlantic Ocean. Her crew were rescued by Delia (United Kingdom). Hellespont was on a voyage from New York, United States to Cork.
Indefatiguable	United Kingdom	The ship was driven ashore and wrecked at Métis-sur-Mer, Province of Canada before 25 May.
Johanna	Danzig	The ship was driven ashore on Seskar. She was on a voyage from Danzig to Saint Petersburg. She was refloated, and arrived at Saint Petersburg on 23 May.
Jonge Reintje	Netherlands	The ship was driven ashore on Seskar by ice and sank. Her crew were rescued.
Lady Fitzroy	(United Kingdom of Great Britain and Ireland) New Zealand	The ship was wrecked on the coast of New Zealand.
Le Martin	France	The whaler was wrecked on Tahiti.
Malcruko	(Ottoman Empire) Egypt	The ship was wrecked near Ajaccio, Corsica, France.
Marianne	Belgium	The ship was wrecked at the mouth of the Rhône before 15 May. Her crew were rescued. She was on a voyage from Trieste to Antwerp.
Marie Key	Belgium	The ship was driven ashore near Dunkirk, Nord, France before 17 May. She was on a voyage from Antwerp to Rio de Janeiro, Brazil. She was refloated and put back to Antwerp.
Mariner	(United Kingdom of Great Britain and Ireland) British North America	The ship was wrecked on the Isle of Pines, Cuba.
Mary and Ellen, or Mary and Eleanor	United Kingdom	The ship was abandoned in the Atlantic Ocean before 9 May. She was discovered on 23 May by Owen Glendower (United Kingdom) and set afire.
Monmouth	United States	The full-rigged ship ran aground on the Mosella Reef. She was refloated with assistance from Republican (United States).
Princess Mary	United Kingdom	The ship was abandoned with the loss of two lives. Survivors were rescued by Sir Robert Peel (United Kingdom). Princess Mary was on a voyage from London to Quebec City.
Ranger	(United Kingdom of Great Britain and Ireland) New South Wales	The schooner departed from Circular Head for Sydney in early May. No further trace, presumed foundered with the loss of all hands.
Treby	United Kingdom	The ship struck a sunken rock and foundered in the Mediterranean Sea off "Port Saloceme", Egypt before 19 May. Her crew were rescued. She was on a voyage from Sunderland, County Durham to Alexandria, Egypt.
Two Brothers	(United Kingdom of Great Britain and Ireland) New Zealand	The ship was wrecked on the coast of New Zealand.
Wennezzen	Belgium	The ship was driven ashore on the Île de Sein, Finistère, France. She was on a voyage from Quimper, Finistère to St. Ubes, Portugal. She was refloated and taken in to Brest, Finistère for repaies.
Yarmouth	United Kingdom	The barque was abandoned in the Atlantic Ocean. She was driven ashore at Cape Henlopen, Delaware, United States and wrecked on 19 May. She had been refloated and towed in to New York by 16 July.
