= Whitesands Bay (Pembrokeshire) =

Bay and beach in Wales, UK

Coordinates: 51°53′40″N 5°17′45″W

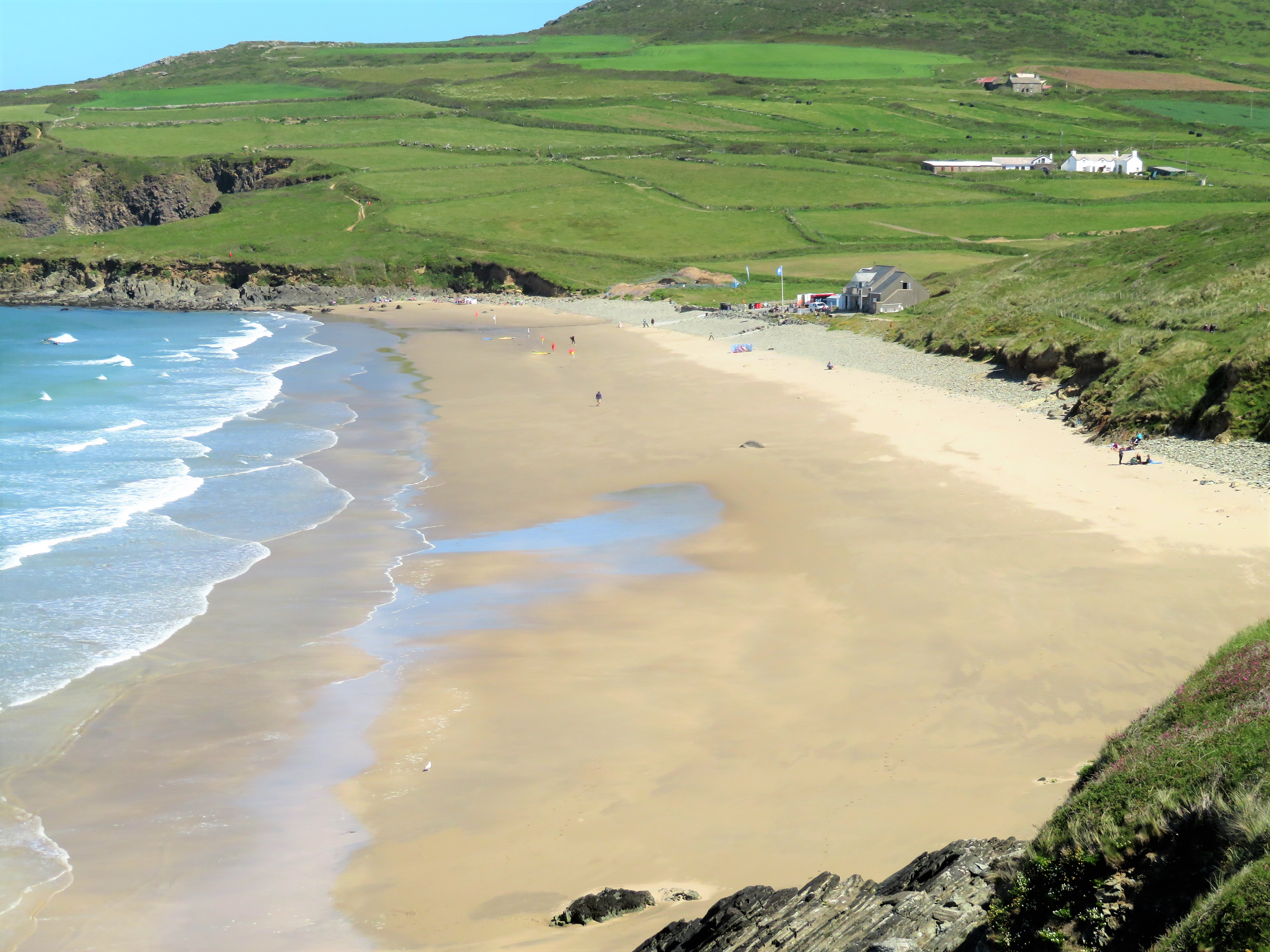
Whitesands Bay

Whitesands Bay (Welsh: Porth Mawr) is a Blue Flag beach situated on the St David's peninsula in the Pembrokeshire Coast National Park, Wales. Whitesand Bay, on some maps, located 2 miles (3.2 km) west of St. Davids and 1 mile (1.6 km) south of St Davids Head, has been described as the best surfing beach in Pembrokeshire.

== Description ==
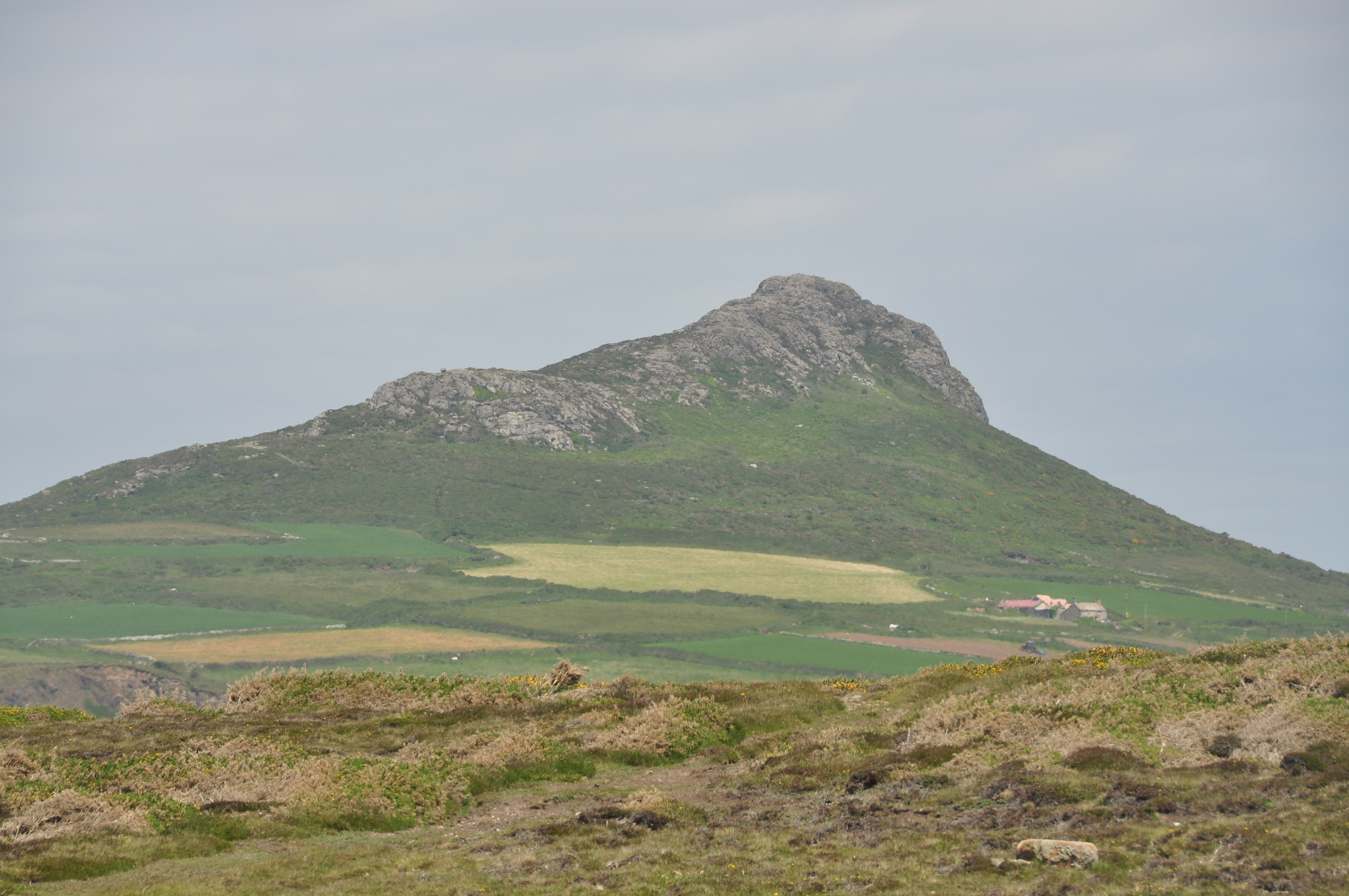
Carn Llidi

The area northeast of the wide, sandy bay is dominated by Carn Llidi, a rocky outcrop, 594 feet (181 m) at its highest point. The Pembrokeshire Coast Path provides access on foot in the north to the secluded bays of Porthlleuog and Porthmelgan. To the south, the coastal path leads to Porthselau and St. Justinian's, with views of Ramsey Island. A number of megalithic burial chambers, stone hut circles and Iron Age field systems and enclosures are in the vicinity of Carn Llidi and St Davids Head.

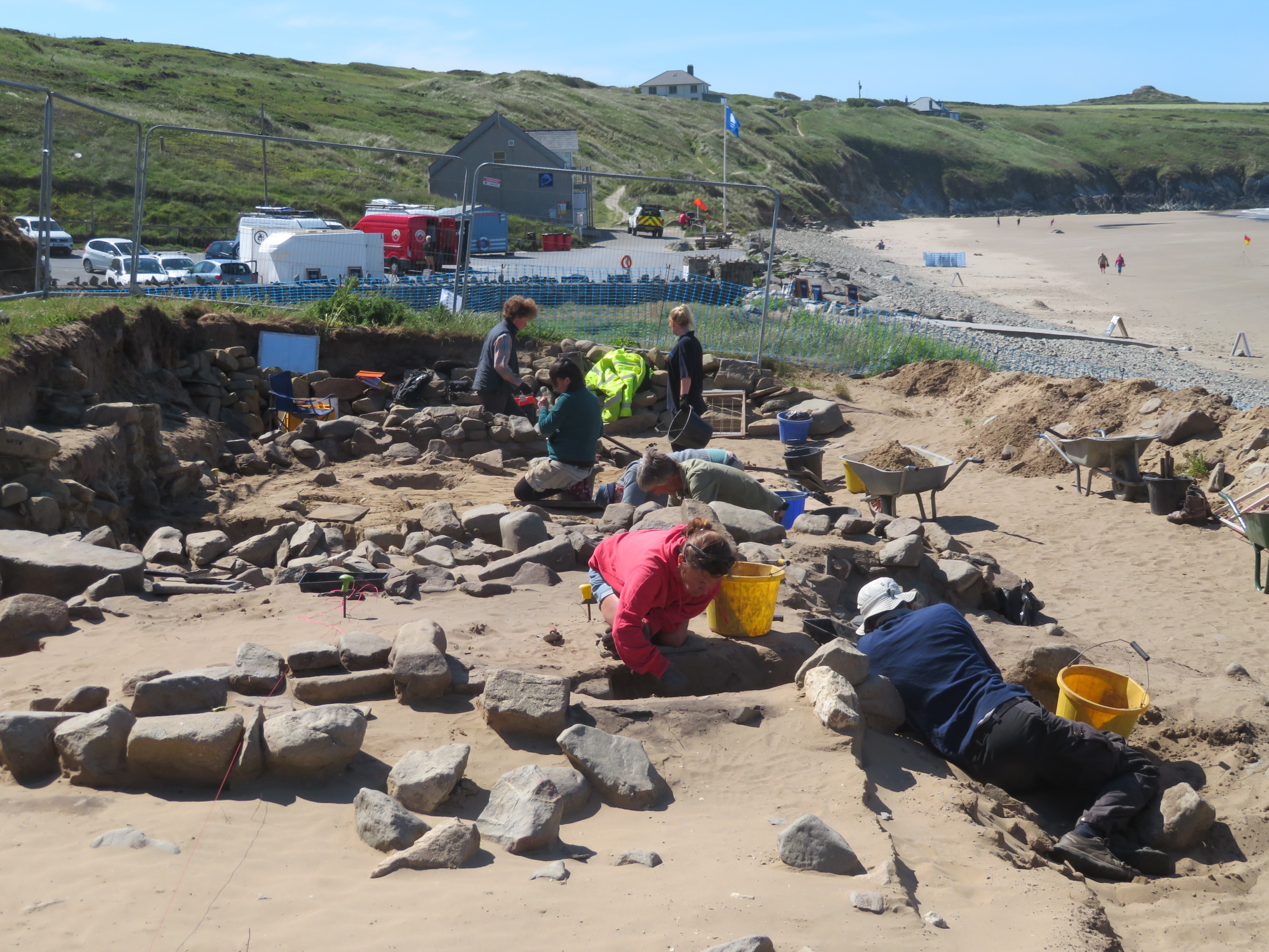
Archaeological dig at St Patrick's chapel; 2021

There is a tradition that St. Patrick set sail from this beach in 432 AD to convert Ireland to Christianity. The site of a Celtic chapel, dedicated to St Patrick, is located under a mound by the car park just to the east of the bay, at what is thought to have been the disembarkation point for pilgrims to St Davids Cathedral. St David may have been educated at Ty Gwyn, the white farmhouse that overlooks the beach, by St Paulinus, and St Non, David's mother, may have lived here when it was a monastery. The burial ground was in use from the 8th to 11th centuries, and remains have been removed by Dyfed Archaeological Trust to the National Museum of Wales to preserve them from coastal erosion.

At very low tide and after heavy storms the remains of an ancient, submerged forest can be seen on the beach, consisting of stumps of birch, fir, hazel and oak trees. The remains of animals have also been found in these deposits, including parts of an aurochs, a red deer antler and a brown bear jaw.

== Facilities ==
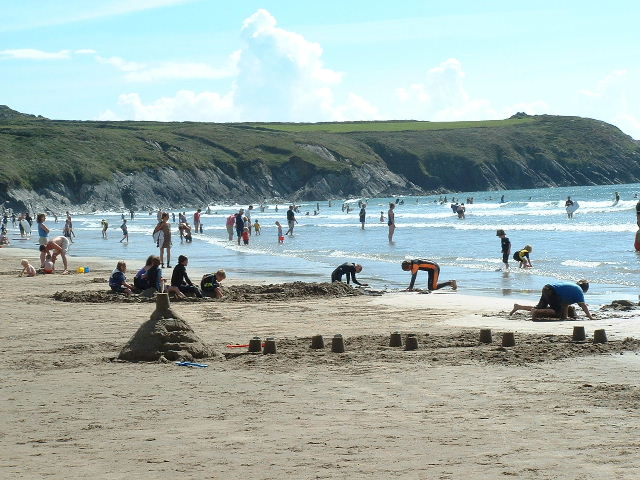
Whitesands beach

- Car parks
- Wheelchair access to beach
- Beach shop and cafe
- Lifeguard service (summer months)
- Emergency equipment
- Telephone
- Golf course (9 hole links)
- Youth hostel
- Surf rental
- Camp site (Easter to end October)
- Toilets
