= St Davids City Hall =

Municipal building in Pembrokeshire, Wales

- Neuadd y Ddinas Tyddewi (Welsh)
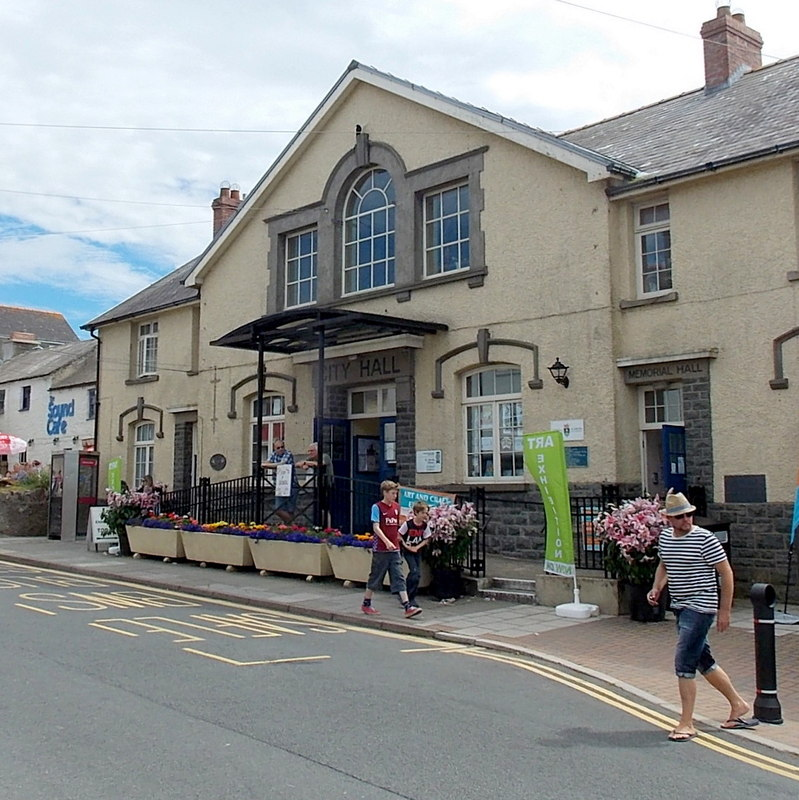
- St Davids City Hall

- Shown in Pembrokeshire
- 51.8807°N 5.2643°W
- Location: High Street, St Davids

History
- Built: 1924

Site notes
- Architect: Frank Ingleton
- Architectural style: Italianate style

St Davids City Hall (Welsh: Neuadd y Ddinas Tyddewi) is a municipal building in the High Street, St Davids, Pembrokeshire, Wales. The structure is currently used as the meeting place of St Davids City Council and as a public library.

== History ==
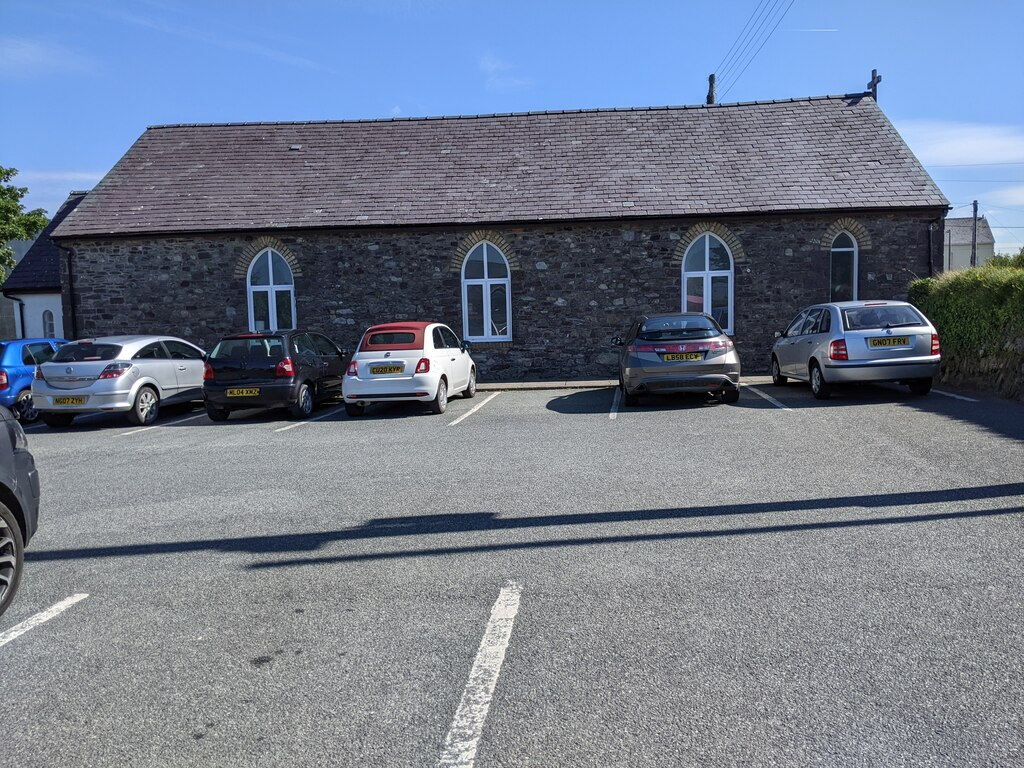
The first municipal building in St Davids

The first municipal building in St Davids was made possible by a local land owner, David Griffiths, who agreed to grant a 99-year lease over a site in New Street for a concert and lecture hall. The building was designed in the vernacular style, built in rubble masonry and was completed in 1866. It was a rectangular building, fenestrated on both sides by a series of arched windows, with a small porch on the north side. The borough council, which had not met for many years, was abolished under the Municipal Corporations Act 1883.

After the First World War, community leaders decided to commission a more substantial municipal building as a lasting memorial to local service personnel who had died in the war. The site chosen was vacant land on the south side of the High Street. The new building was designed by Frank Ingleton of Haverfordwest in the Italianate style, built in brick with a roughcast finish and was completed in 1924. (Note: The first building went on serve as a school and then as a cinema before becoming St Michael's Catholic Church in 1962.)

The design involved a symmetrical main frontage of seven bays facing onto the High Street. The central section of three bays, which was slightly projected forward, featured a double doorway with a rectangular fanlight flanked by grey brick pilasters supporting an entablature inscribed with the words "City Hall", and a cornice. The outer bays of the central section were fenestrated with segmental headed casement windows with hood moulds on the ground floor, and there was a central Venetian window on the first floor breaking into the pediment above. The inner bays of the wings featured doorways on the ground floor and narrow casement windows on the first floor, while the end bays were fenestrated by segmental headed casement windows with hood moulds on the ground floor and by bi-partite casement windows on the first floor. Internally, the principal rooms were the main hall, which was 53.5 feet (16.3 m) long and 32 feet (9.8 m) wide, the memorial hall and the library. The memorial hall became the meeting place of St Davids City Council.

A plaque recording the visit of the Prince and Princess of Wales in October 1981, and the visit of Queen Elizabeth II and the Duke of Edinburgh in April 1982, was erected on the right of the central section of the main frontage of the building following the visits. An extensive programme of works, which included the installation of a new porch and a new colour on the roughcast finish, was completed in 2002.

The BBC documentary series, Pembrokeshire: Land of Dreams, was launched by the politician, Glynn Davies, at the City Hall in January 2005.
