= Pen Dal-aderyn =

Westernmost point of mainland Wales

Coordinates: 51.86133°N 5.32141°W

Pen Dal-aderyn in Pembrokeshire, west of St Davids, is the westernmost point of mainland Wales. Its name means 'bird-catching head' in Welsh.

== Description ==
Pen Dal-aderyn (SM 715 233) forms the bold, wave-cut extremity of the St Davids headland and is accepted by Ordnance Survey mapping as the westernmost point of the Welsh mainland. Rising to roughly 26 m above Ramsey Sound, the headland lies 3 km south-west of St Davids and is skirted by both the Pembrokeshire Coast Path and a National Trust strip that links Porthlysgi Bay to Porthclais. From the clifftop the view spans the Bishops and Clerks rocks, the tidal race of "the Bitches" and the serrated north cliffs of Ramsey Island a kilometre offshore.

The promontory exposes the Treginnis Group of the late Precambrian Pebidian Volcanic Series—purplish keratophyric lavas and associated tuffs and agglomerates that dip gently south-east beneath younger Cambrian sandstones. Small quartz-copper veins were trial-worked here in the nineteenth century; remnants of the Treginnis copper mine, including a part-infilled shaft just east of the point, are passed by walkers on the coast path.

Recorded as Pen dal aderyn in 1843 and Trwyn Talderyn in 1840, the toponym probably fuses tâl 'end" with aderyn "bird", yielding a sense of "bird-headland"; a later folk reinterpretation connected dal with "to catch", giving rise to the literal modern translation "bird-catching head". Today Pen Dal-aderyn is a waypoint for coastal kayakers negotiating Ramsey Sound's 6-knot tides and a favoured perch for cetacean-watchers scanning summer feeding lines that run between the mainland and Ramsey Island.
