= River Alun, Pembrokeshire =

River in Pembrokeshire, Wales

Coordinates: 51°52′N 5°17′W

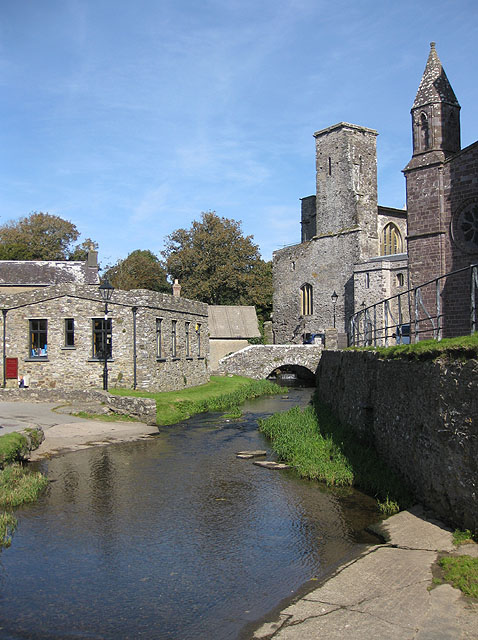
Afon Alun in St Davids

The River Alun is a small river in northwest Pembrokeshire, Wales, which rises near Tretio Common and flows southwestwards to St Davids to empty into St Bride's Bay at the rocky inlet of Porth Clais.
