= Coetan Arthur =

Neolithic burial chamber near St David's Head, west Wales

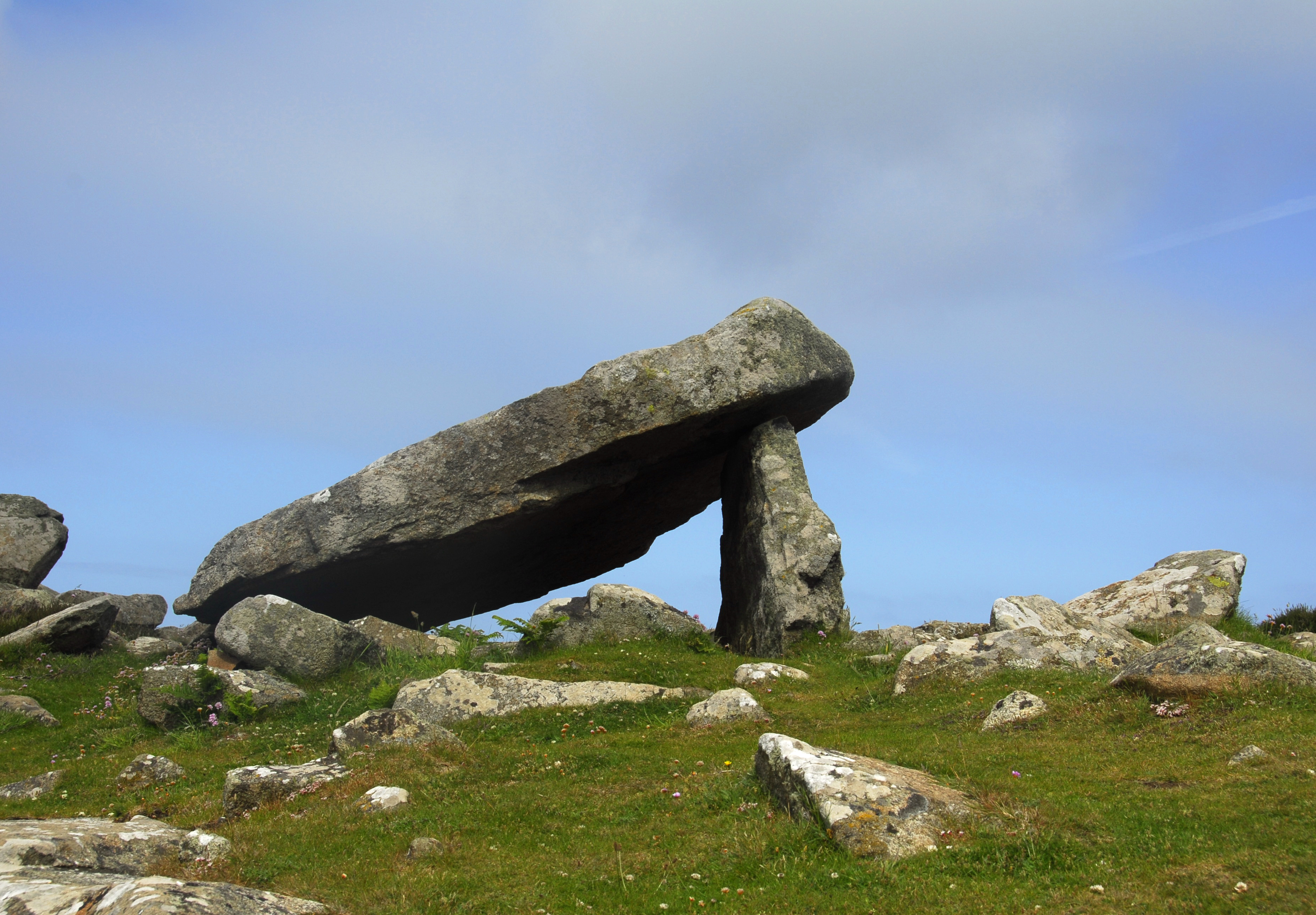
- The dolmen in 2009

- Location in Wales, United Kingdom
- 51.9048°N 5.3083°W
- Type: Dolmen
- Location: Wales, United Kingdom

History
- Built: c. 3000 BC

Site notes
- Material: Stone
- Height: c. 1.5 m (4 ft 11 in)
- Length: c. 6 m (20 ft)
- Width: c. 2.5 m (8 ft 2 in)

Coetan Arthur dolmen, also known as Arthur's Quoit is the remains of a Neolithic burial chamber (also known as a quoit). It dates from around 3000 BC. The site, situated on the hillside close to St Davids Head in Pembrokeshire, Wales, is the collapsed chamber of what is presumed to be a passage grave which also has a round barrow. The massive capstone measures around 6 m (20 ft) by 2.5 m (8 ft 2 in) and is supported on one side by an orthostat approximately 1.5 m (4 ft 11 in) in height.

The headland is in the care of the National Trust and the site is a scheduled ancient monument.

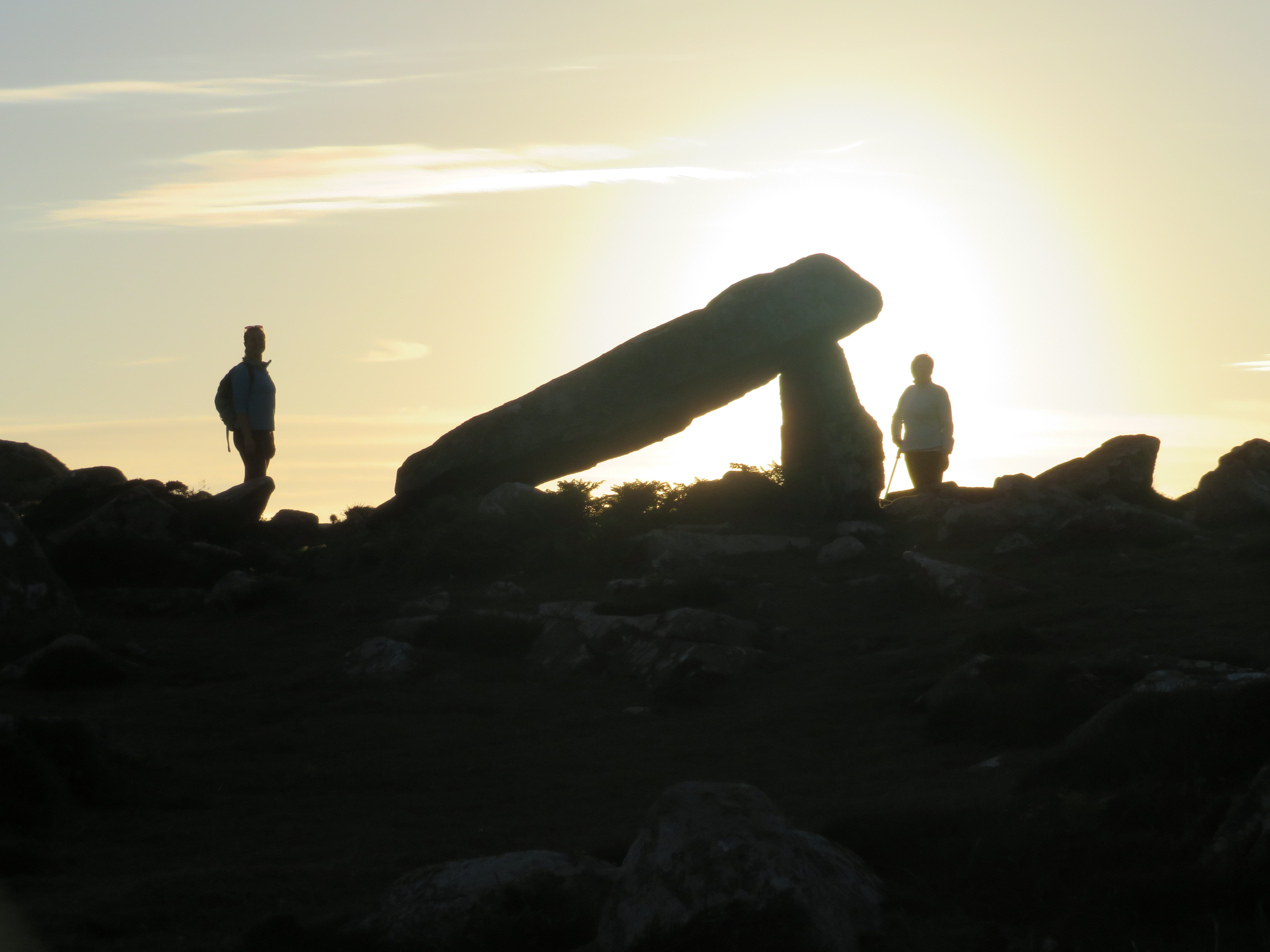
Sunset at Coetan Arthur

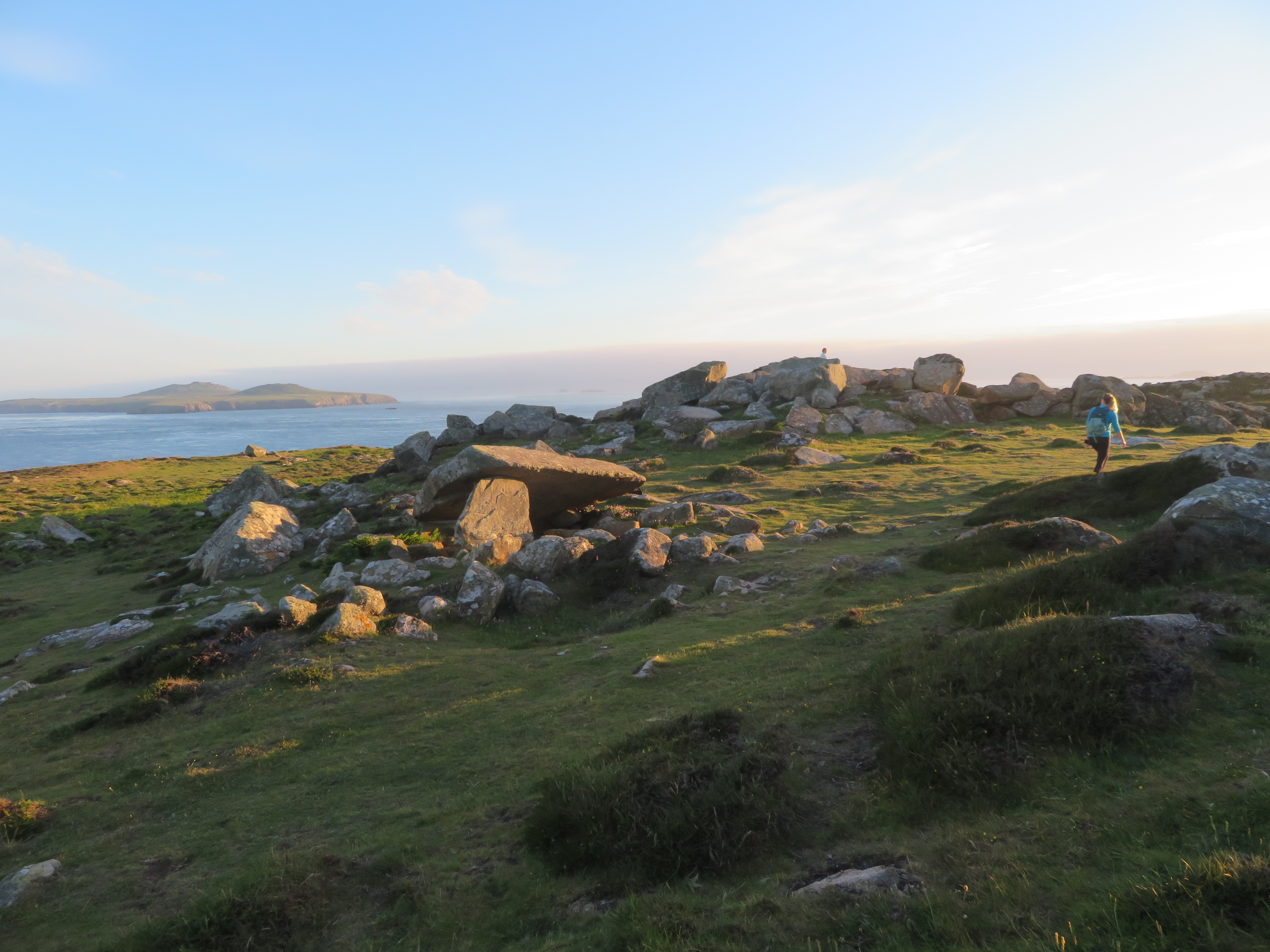
The cromlech, with Ramsey Island in the background

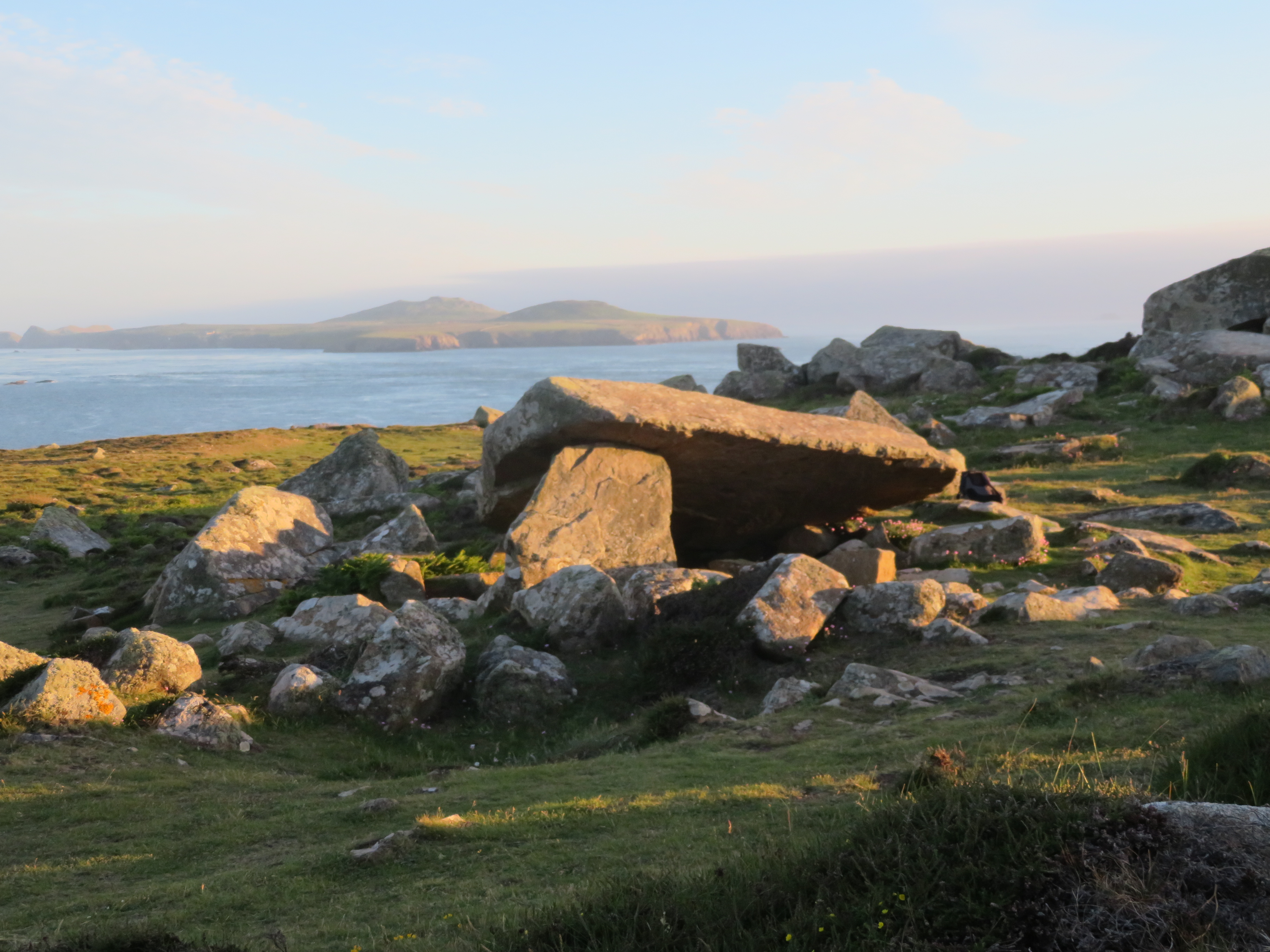

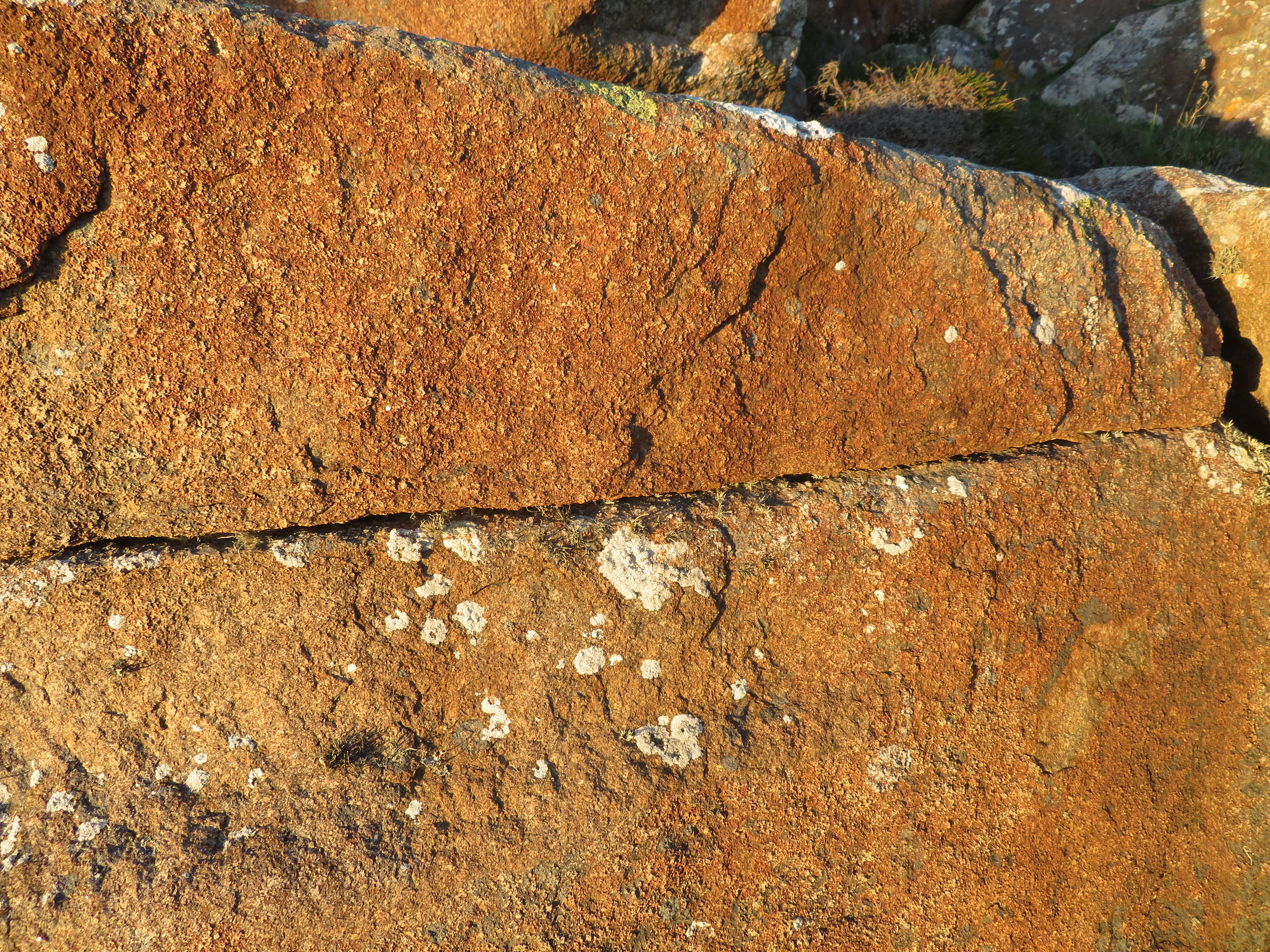
Close up
