= Carn Llidi =

Hill in Wales

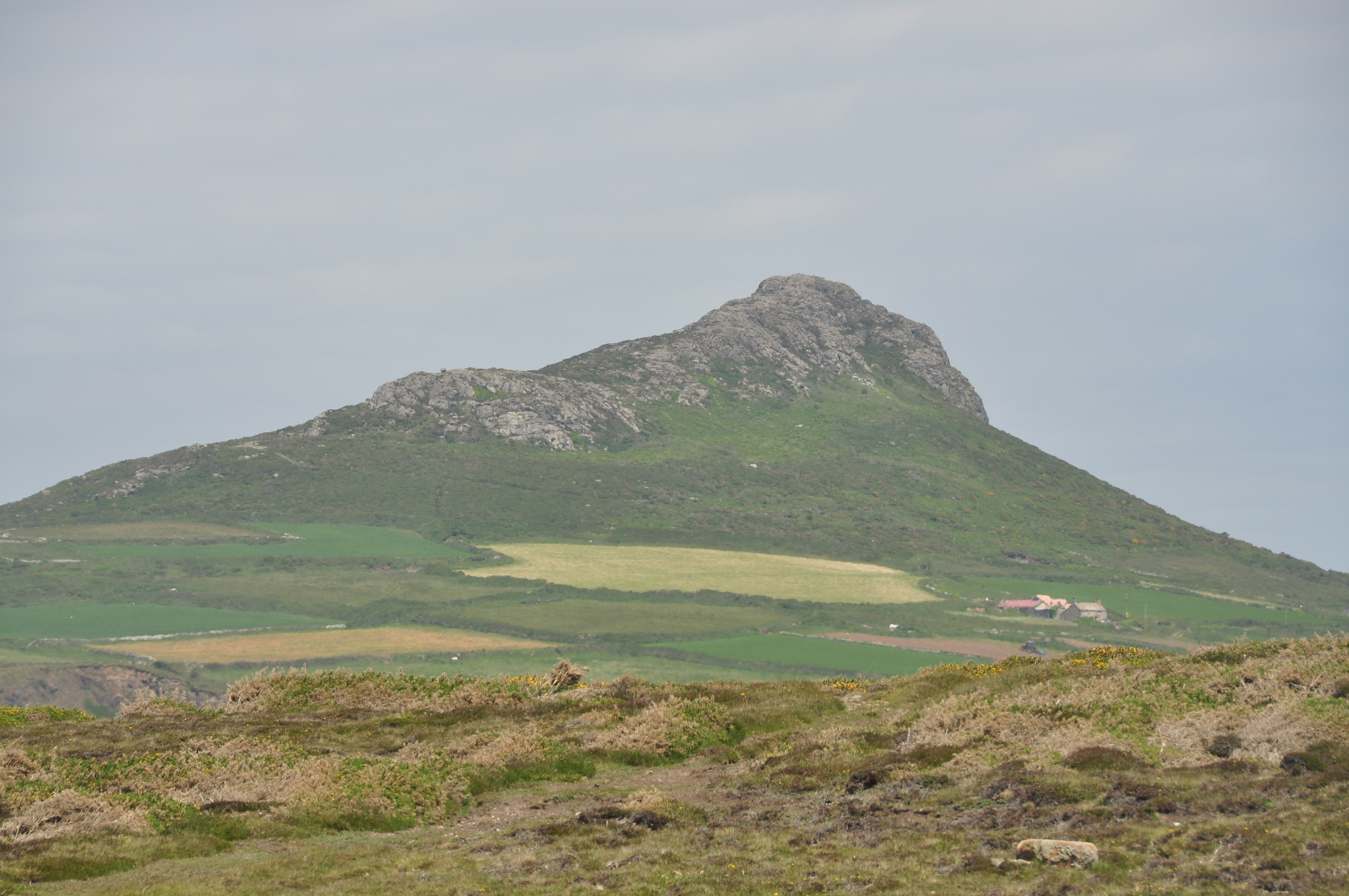

Highest point
- Elevation: 594 ft (181 m)
- Prominence: 400 ft (120 m)
- Parent peak: Garn Fawr
- Listing: HuMP
- Coordinates: 51°54′16″N 5°17′23″W

Naming
- English translation: Cairn of the Ashes
- Language of name: Welsh

Geography
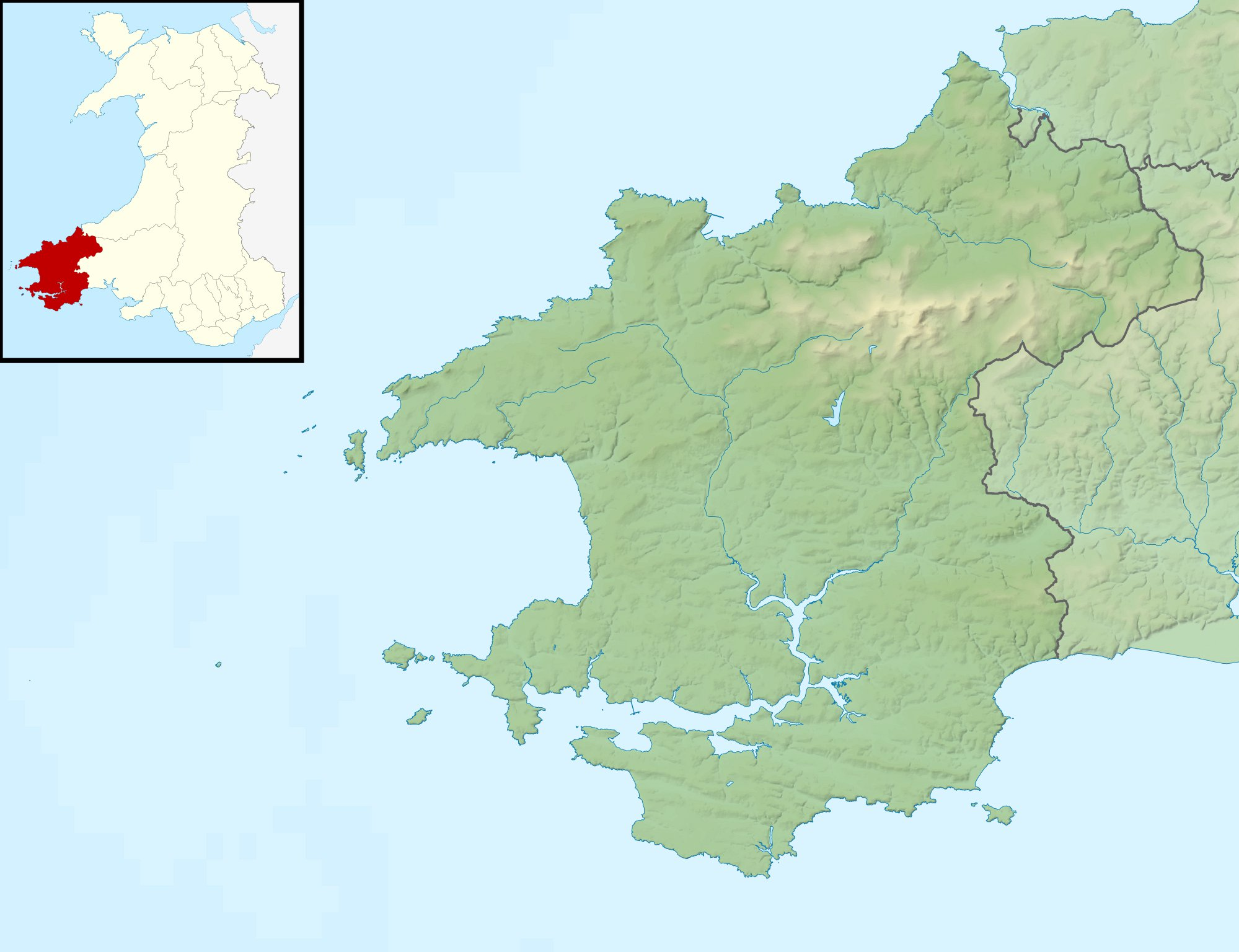
- Location within Pembrokeshire
- Location: St David's Head, Wales
- OS grid: SM738280

Carn Llidi is a hill east of St David's Head in Pembrokeshire, Wales. Carn Llidi and its surrounding area is part of the Pembrokeshire Coast National Park.

The 594 feet (181 m) rocky hill stands in a prominent and isolated position dominating Whitesands Bay. On clear days, there are views west towards Ramsey Island and the Bishops and Clerks islets, and north towards Strumble Head; on clear evenings, in mid-summer at sunset, glimpses of the Wicklow Mountains in Ireland.

== Archaeology ==
The area is rich in archaeology. Two burial chambers, presumed to be neolithic, are located on the higher southwest slopes of the hill. Another stone nearby may be the capstone of a megalithic chamber. Prehistoric enclosures and field systems are located to the northwest of the hill, near to an iron-age defensive wall.

During World War II, a Chain Home Low early-warning radar station was located on Carn Llidi. The concrete base and a Lewis gun pit remain.

Also during World War II, on 4 June 1943, a Martin B-26 Marauder medium bomber of the 335th Bombardment Group of the US Air Force crashed into Carn Llidi killing all four crew, after it had become lost in poor weather on a flight from North Africa to Cornwall. A memorial incorporating one of the twisted propeller blades is located in the Whitesands Bay car park.

== Name ==
The meaning of Carn Llidi is Cairn of the Ashes, llidi being a South Welsh variant of lludw, meaning ash or ashes.

== Access to the summit ==
The walk which leads from a Whitesands Bay car park can take you to the summit either through Porthmawr Farm or via the coast path towards St Davids Head. The climb does not require any special hiking ability, but it is advisable to wear proper outdoor clothing.

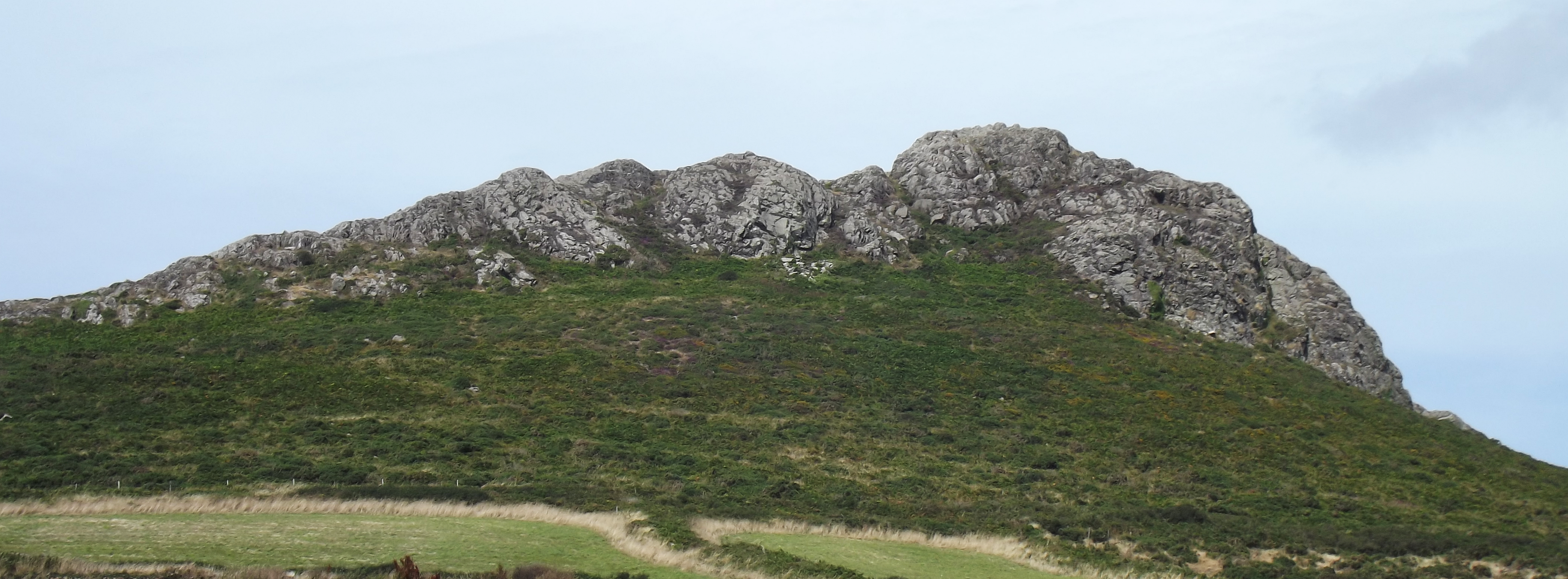
Carn Llidi from Whitesands Bay

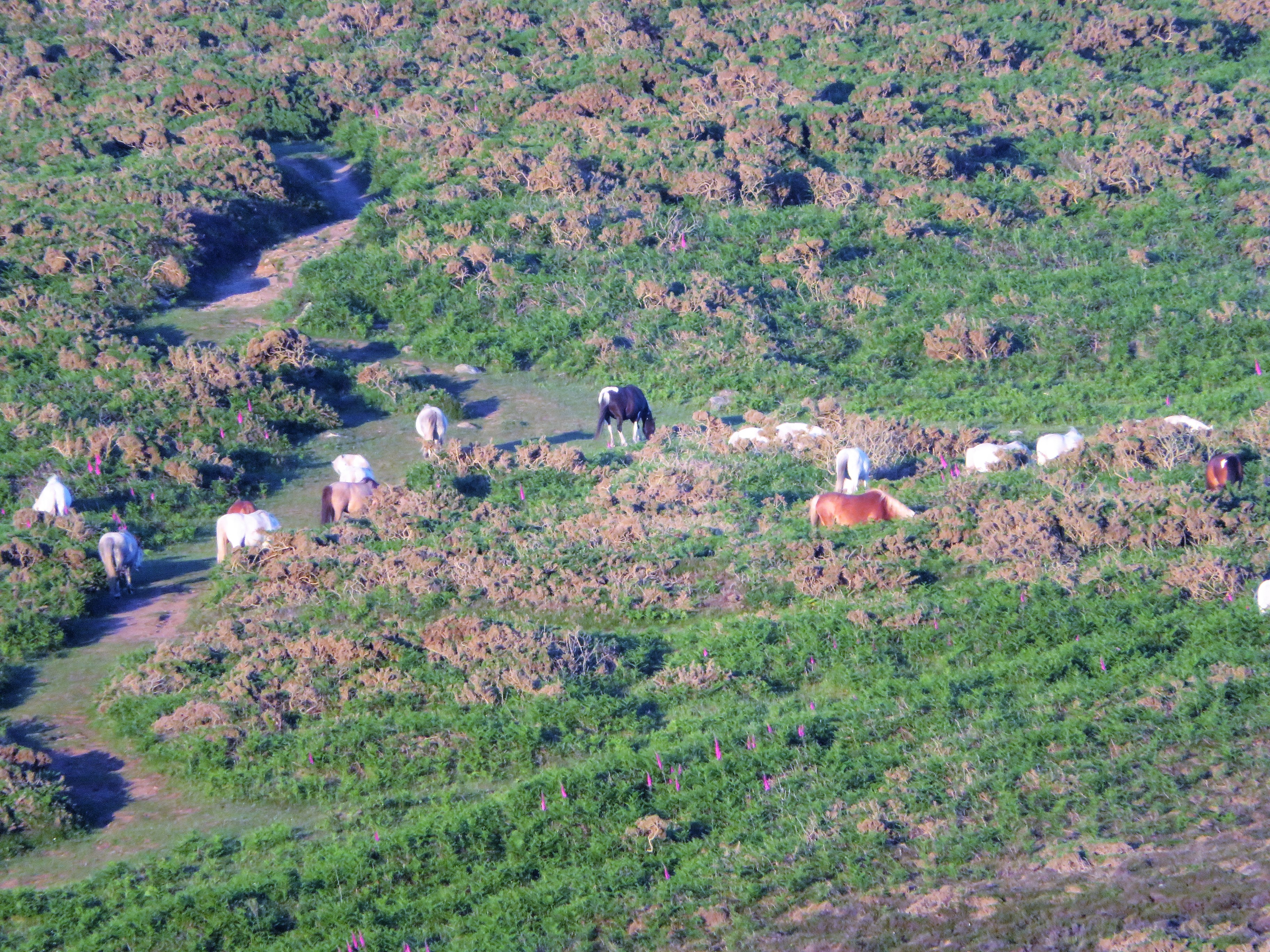
Welsh mountain ponies near the summit

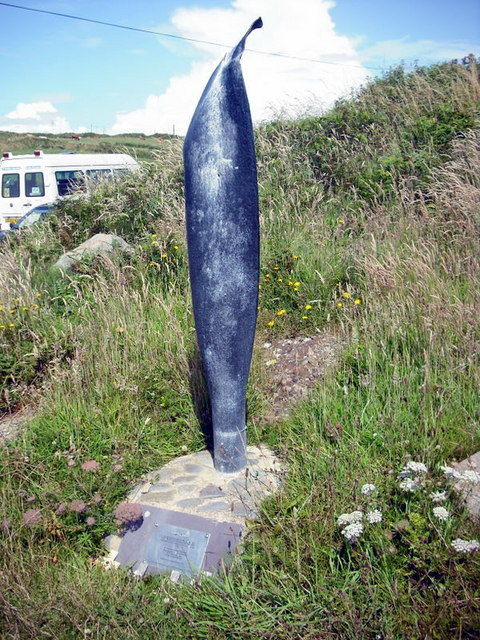
Memorial to the 1943 USAF plane crash

== See also ==
- Lists of mountains and hills in the British Isles
