= Porthclais =

Harbour in Pembrokeshire, Wales

Coordinates: 51.868°N 5.280°W

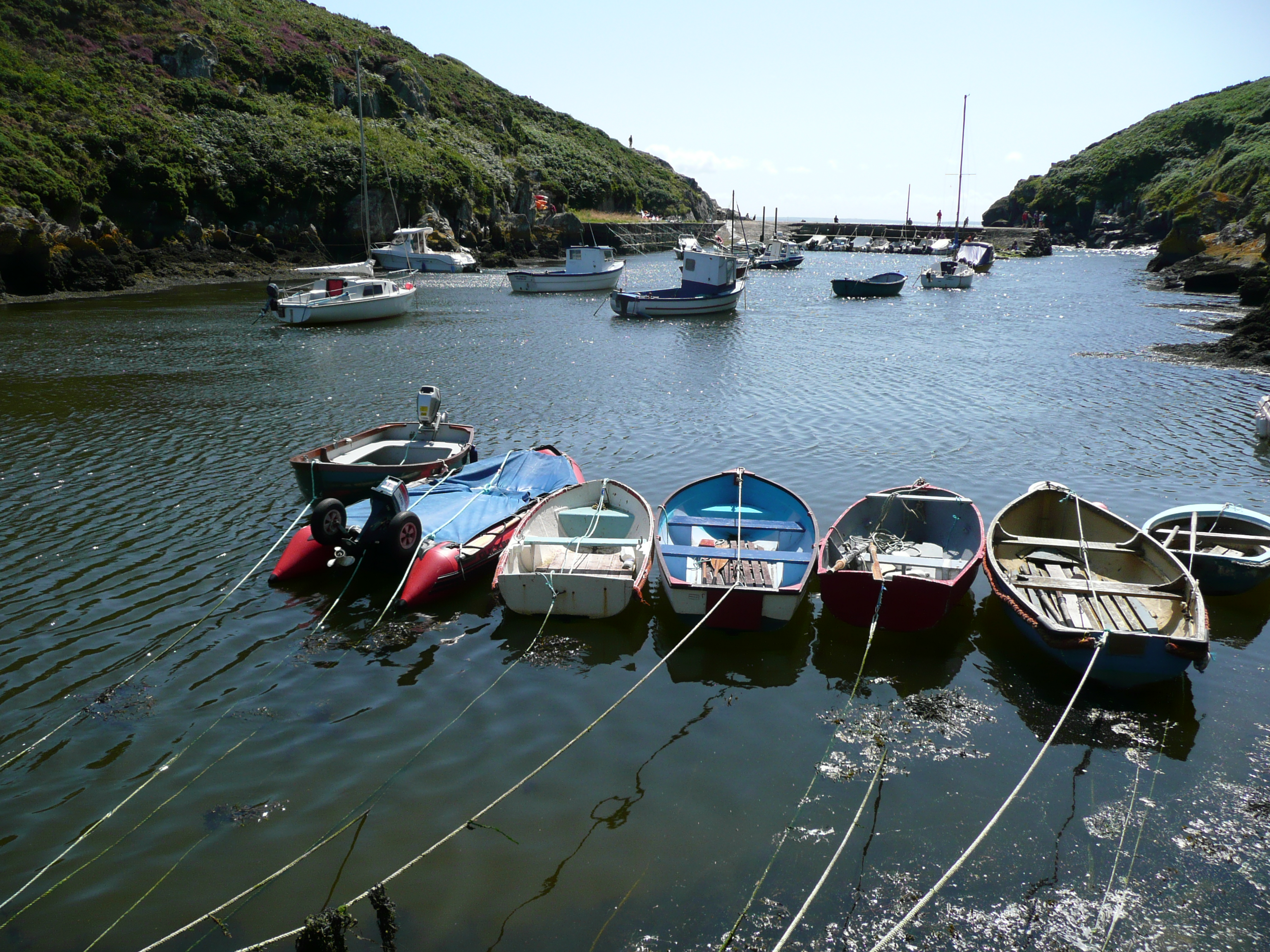
Porthclais harbour

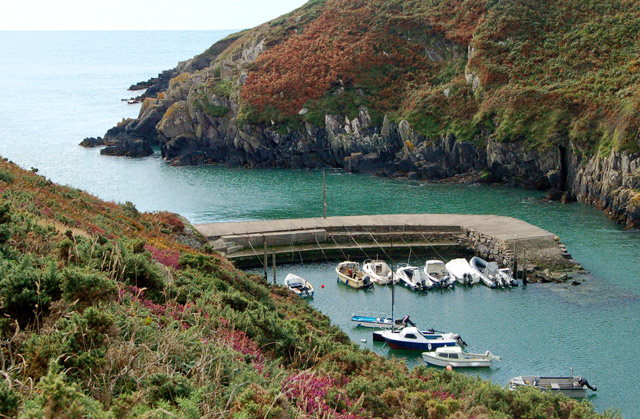
Porthclais harbour entrance

Porthclais (also known as Porth Clais) is a small sheltered inlet harbour near St Davids, Pembrokeshire, Wales, in the community of St Davids and the Cathedral Close.

== History ==
Porthclais harbour was built in the 12th century, importing coal and timber. The entire harbour is within the St David's Peninsula Site of Special Scientific Interest. Porthclais is still used as a small port by local fishermen and recreational sailors. The largely intact old harbour wall may have been built by the Romans, and the harbour was mentioned in the mediaeval Mabinogion. The earliest recorded date of trade through the port is 1385.

The harbour dries out at low tide and is a good launching spot for small boats, dive craft and kayaks who are setting out to explore St Bride's Bay. Porthclais harbour has some of the best preserved remains of stone Lime kilns in Pembrokeshire.

== Harbour authority ==
Porthclais Harbour Authority Limited provides harbour services; the harbour can accommodate around 50 small boats and is very busy at peak times.

== Facilities ==
There is a car park on the site of what used to be the now defunct St. Davids gasworks, which in turn was built on the site of a spring where it is said St. David himself was baptised.
