= Stagshaw =

Stagshaw may refer to:

- Stagshaw Garden, garden near Ambleside, Cumbria, England, owned by National Trust
- Stagshaw, a 1923 steam locomotive stored at Tanfield Railway in North East England
- Stagshaw Roundabout, location near the Portgate Roman remains in Northumberland, England
- Stagshaw, a station of the BBC Regional Programme serving the North East of England and Cumbria from 1937
- Stagshaw, a ship which was wrecked on 9 February 1848
- Stagshaw, a ship which was wrecked on 27 January 1850
- Stagshaw, a ship which was wrecked on 8 June 1871
- Stagshaw, a ship which was wrecked on 4 November 1878
