= List of shipwrecks in June 1871 =

The list of shipwrecks in June 1871 includes ships sunk, foundered, grounded, or otherwise lost during June 1871.

== 1 June ==
List of shipwrecks: 1 June 1871
Ship	State	Description
Baroda	United Kingdom	The ship ran aground on the Muskaputty Lumps, in the Hooghly River. She was on a voyage from Liverpool, Lancashire to Calcutta, India. She was refloated the next day and resumed her voyage.
Industry	New Zealand	The 24-ton schooner was wrecked on the bar at the mouth of the Waikato River.

== 2 June ==
List of shipwrecks: 2 June 1871
Ship	State	Description
Oriental	United Kingdom	The barque departed from Bombay, India for Bremen, Germany. No further trace, presumed foundered with the loss of all hands.
Phoenix	United Kingdom	The steamship collided with the steamship Clydesdale (United Kingdom) at Stornoway, Isle of Lewis, Outer Hebrides and was beached. She was on a voyage from Holm to Stornoway. She was refloated after temporary repairs were made and taken in to Stornoway.

== 3 June ==
List of shipwrecks: 3 June 1871
Ship	State	Description
Bengoechea, or Vengoechea	United States of Colombia	The steamship was driven ashore at "Vuelta de la Madre de Bois". She was on a voyage from Honda to Barranquilla.
Good Design	United Kingdom	The schooner was abandoned in the Pentland Firth with the loss of five of her six crew. She was subsequently taken in to Wick, Caithness.
Pacific	United Kingdom	The ship was driven ashore at East Hampton, New York, United States. She was on a voyage from the Clyde to New York City. She was refloated the next day and completed her voyage on 6 June.

== 4 June ==
List of shipwrecks: 4 June 1871
Ship	State	Description
Alabama	United States	The steamship was driven ashore and wrecked at Galveston, Texas.
Aroot	United Kingdom	The ship was sighted in the Indian Ocean whilst on a voyage from Calcutta, India to London. No further trace, presumed foundered with the loss of all hands.
Dhunsawee	India	The ship was wrecked at Bassein. Her crew were rescued. She was on a voyage from Bassein to Ghoga.
Eliza	United Kingdom	The ship was wrecked at Ingonish, Nova Scotia, Canada. Her crew were rescued. She was on a voyage from Gloucester to Miramichi, New Brunswick, Canada
Euterpe	United States	The clipper was abandoned off the coast of Brazil with the loss of nine of her 26 crew. She was on a voyage from Callao, Peru to Falmouth, Cornwall, United Kingdom.
Helene	Germany	The schooner foundered in the Atlantic Ocean 24°30′S 34°58′W). Her crew were rescued by the barque Pride of Devon (United Kingdom). Helene was on a voyage from the Rio Grande to Pernambuco, Brazil.
Virginia	United States	The steamship sank at Galveston. She was on a voyage from Newport, Monmouthshire, United Kingdom to Galveston.

== 5 June ==
List of shipwrecks: 5 June 1871
Ship	State	Description
Euterpe	United States	The ship foundered in the Atlantic Ocean. Her 25 crew took to two boats; Seventeen crew in one of the boats reached the Rio Grande, those in the other boat were rescuedon 7 June by the barque Pepita (United Kingdom). Euterpe was on a voyage from the Guañape Islands, Peru to Falmouth, Cornwall, United Kingdom.
Infanta	United Kingdom	The schooner was wrecked on the Longsand, in the North Sea off the coast of Essex She was on a voyage from Newcastle upon Tyne, Northumberland to Weymouth, Dorset.
Virginia Dare	United States	The barque foundered 6 nautical miles (11 km) off Galveston, Texas. Her crew were rescued. She was on a voyage from Cardiff, Glamorgan, United Kingdom to Galveston.

== 7 June ==
List of shipwrecks: 7 June 1871
Ship	State	Description
Anne Inglis	United Kingdom	The ship sprang a leak and put in to Berwick upon Tweed, Northumberland in a waterlogged condition. She was on a voyage from Montrose, Forfarshire to Newcastle upon Tyne, Northumberland.
Berwick Packet	United Kingdom	The ship was driven ashore and sank at Donaghadee, County Down. She was on a voyage from the Clyde to New York, United States.
Lady of the Lake	United Kingdom	The ship ran aground on the Maplin Sand, in the North Sea off the coast of Essex. She was refloated and resumed her voyage.
Mirage	United Kingdom	The barque was wrecked on "Haeling Island". Her crew were rescued. She was on a voyage from Bangkok, Siam to Hong Kong.

== 8 June ==
List of shipwrecks: 8 June 1871
Ship	State	Description
Catharina	Germany	The ship was run into by the steamship Nile (United Kingdom) and was taken in to Reval, Russia in a waterlogged condition. Catharina was on a voyage from Saint Petersburg, Russia to London, United Kingdom. She consequently sank.
George	United Kingdom	The ship ran aground on the Whiting Sand, in the North Sea off the coast of Suffolk and sank. She was on a voyage from Gävle, Sweden to Wisbech, Cambridgeshire.
John	United Kingdom	The brig sank at Honfleur, Manche, France. She was on a voyage from Scarborough, Yorkshire to Honfleur.
Melita	United Kingdom	The Yorkshire Billyboy collided with the steamship Danube (United Kingdom) and sank at Hull, Yorkshire.
Stagshaw	United Kingdom	The steamship ran aground in the Danube 2 nautical miles (3.7 km) downstream of Galaţi, Ottoman Empire.
Thames	United Kingdom	The ship departed from Saigon, French Indo-China for Hong Kong. No further trace, presumed foundered with the loss of all hands.
Tirzah	United Kingdom	The ship ran aground off Naissaar, Russia. She was on a voyage from Hull, Yorkshire to Kronstadt, Russia. She was refloated.

== 9 June ==
List of shipwrecks: 9 June 1871
Ship	State	Description
Bells	United Kingdom	The barque caught fire at sea. She put in to Plymouth, Devon on 19 June. She was on a voyage from Bahia, Brazil to Bremen, Germany.
China	Germany	The barque was wrecked on the Minsener Oude-Ooge, in the Elbe. Her crew were rescued.
Fathel Rahamon	India	The ship foundered in the Indian Ocean off Calicut with the loss of 25 lives. She was on a voyage from Bombay to Penang, Straits Settlements.
Hertha	Germany	The ship ran aground in Åland, Grand Duchy of Finland.
Unnamed	Canada	A schooner was driven ashore and wrecked on "Foxtail Island", New York, United States.

== 10 June ==
List of shipwrecks: 10 June 1871
Ship	State	Description
Alecto	United Kingdom	The brigantine ran aground on the Holm Sand, in the North Sea off the coast of Suffolk. She was refloated with assistance.
Northumbria	United Kingdom	The ship ran aground near the Cogensand Lighthouse, Germany. She was on a voyage from Callao, Peru to Hamburg, Germany. She was refloated on 20 June and taken in to Hamburg.
Pera	United Kingdom	The ship ran aground on the Cockle Sand, in the North Sea off the coast of Norfolk. She was on a voyage from South Shields, County Durham to Galle, Ceylon. She was refloated and taken in to Great Yarmouth, Norfolk.

== 11 June ==
List of shipwrecks: 11 June 1871
Ship	State	Description
Asia	United Kingdom	The steamship was driven ashore on Fårö, Sweden. She was later refloated and towed in to Fårösund, Sweden.
Brothers And Sister	New Zealand	The 21-ton ketch was driven ashore and wrecked at Constant Bay, Charleston on New Zealand's South island West Coast after her mooring lines broke.
Wealth of Nations	United Kingdom	The full-rigged ship was wrecked on the Hormigas Rocks, near Callao, Peru with the loss of all but nine of her twenty crew. Five of the survivors were rescued by the barque M. A. B. (Peru), three more landed near Chancay. Wealth of Nations was on a voyage from the Guañape Islands, Peru to a British port.

== 12 June ==
List of shipwrecks: 12 June 1871
Ship	State	Description
Annie Smith	United Kingdom	The steamship was wrecked near Bonifacio, Corsica, France with the loss of two of her crew. She was on a voyage from Marseille, Bouches-du-Rhône, France to Galaţi, Ottoman Empire.
Benedicta	United Kingdom	The ship foundered. Her crew were rescued. She was on a voyage from the Guañape Islands, Peru to Falmouth, Cornwall.
Commerce	United Kingdom	The ship was driven ashore and wrecked on "Derlaunbeg Island", County Mayo. Her crew survived. She was on a voyage from Greenock, Renfrewshire to Galway.
Emily	United States	The steam lighter sank at Galveston, Texas.
Joven Miguel	Argentina	The lighter sank at Buenos Aires.
Perseverance	United Kingdom	The ship caught fire 50 nautical miles (93 km) south west of The Lizard, Cornwall. She put in to Falmouth, Cornwall the next day and was sunk by gunfire from HMS Ganges (Royal Navy). Perseverance was on a voyage from Oran, Algeria to Newcastle upon Tyne, Northumberland. She was refloated on 16 October.
Queen of the Belgians	United Kingdom	The ship ran aground 2 nautical miles (3.7 km) south of Charleston, South Carolina, United States. She was on a voyage from Nevis to the Clyde. She was refloated on 14 June and resumed her voyage.
Reno	Argentina	The lighter sank in the River Plate.

== 13 June ==
List of shipwrecks: 13 June 1871
Ship	State	Description
Ardicaple	United Kingdom	The paddle steamer collided with the steamship Alice (United Kingdom) off Rosneath, Argyllshire and was severely damaged at the bows. Her passengers were taken off by Alice.
Catharina	Sweden	The schooner collided with the barque Zeus (Norway) and sank in the Baltic Sea. Her crew were rescued by Zeus. Catharina was on a voyage from Wismar, Germany to Ljugarn.
Kentucky	United States	The ship foundered off the Fiji Islands in a typhoon with the loss of all hands. She was on a voyage from San Francisco, California to the Navigator Islands and Melbourne, Victoria.
Kertell	Russia	The steamship ran aground off Dragør, Denmark.
Louisa	Sweden	The steamship ran aground off Dragør. She was on a voyage from Saint Petersburg, Russia to Stockholm.

== 14 June ==
List of shipwrecks: 14 June 1871
Ship	State	Description
Marine Minister van Roon	Netherlands	The ship was sighted in the Pentland Firth whilst from the River Tyne to Bombay, India. No further trace, presumed foundered with the loss of all hands.

== 15 June ==
List of shipwrecks: 15 June 1871
Ship	State	Description
Astarte	United Kingdom	The steamship ran aground in the Clyde. She was on a voyage from Glasgow, Renfrewshire to Rio de Janeiro, Brazil.
Queen	United Kingdom	The ship ran aground and sank in the River Taff. She was on a voyage from Bristol, Gloucestershire to Cardiff, Glamorgan.
Ulysses	United Kingdom	The steamship ran aground on Olyphant's Island, in the Yangtze. She was on a voyage from Hankou, China to London. She was later refloated and resumed her voyage.

== 16 June ==
List of shipwrecks: 16 June 1871
Ship	State	Description
Clipper	Germany	The ship was wrecked on the Hogsty Reef. Her crew survived. She was on a voyage from Maracaibo, Venezuela to Queenstown, County Cork, United Kingdom.
Florence Louisa	United Kingdom	The barque was damaged by fire in the Clyde. She was on a voyage from Glasgow, Renfrewshire to Demerara, British Guiana.
Isabella	United Kingdom	The brig was driven ashore on Stroma, Caithness. She was on a voyage from Greenock, Renfrewshire to Stettin, Germany. She was refloated and taken in to Scrabster, Caithness.
HMS Megaera	Royal Navy	After springing a leak four days earlier during a voyage from South Africa to Australia, the troopship was beached at Île Saint-Paul in the Indian Ocean. She was declared a total loss.
Pearl	United Kingdom	The ship collided with the schooner Florist (United Kingdom) and was beached at Bowling, Dunbartonshire. She was on a voyage from Glasgow, Renfrewshire to Exeter, Devon.
Semaphore	United Kingdom	The steamship ran ashore on Burial Island and was wrecked. All on board were rescued. She was on a voyage from Liverpool, Lancashire to Londonderry. She was later refloated and beached at Ballyherbert, County Antrim.
Unnamed	Flag unknown	A schooner ran aground on the Burbo Bank, in Liverpool Bay.

== 17 June ==
List of shipwrecks: June 1871
Ship	State	Description
Barranquilla	United States of Colombia	The steamship struck rocks and sank at Honda. She was on a voyage from Honda to Barranquilla.
Elizabeth Christopher	(United Kingdom of Great Britain and Ireland) British Guiana	The ship was wrecked off "Plue Malda". Her crew were rescued.
Queen	United Kingdom	The ship was driven ashoreat "Seniedle", Russia. She was refloated.
Reindeer	Canada	The tug was severely damaged by fire at Montreal, Quebec. She was declared a total loss.
White Swallow	United States	The extreme clipper was abandoned in the Atlantic Ocean 230 nautical miles (430 km) south west of Faial Island, Azores. Her crew reached Faial Island in their boats. She was on a voyage from Boston, Massachusetts to Hong Kong. A search for her found no trace.

== 19 June ==
List of shipwrecks: 19 June 1871
Ship	State	Description
Albion	United Kingdom	The steamship ran aground on the Blacktail Sand, in the Thames Estuary. She was on a voyage from Christiania, Norway to London. She was refloated with assistance and resumed her voyage.
Chalmett	United States	The ship exploded at New York.
Robert and Elizabeth	United Kingdom	The ship was driven ashore at Cromwell's Rock, County Waterford. She was on a voyage from Waterford to the River Duddon.
Unnamed	Flag unknown	A brigantine ran aground on the Girdler Sand, off the Kent coast. She was refloated with the assistance of a tug and resumed her voyage.

== 20 June ==
List of shipwrecks: 20 June 1871
Ship	State	Description
Burdigala	United States	The ship ran aground at San Francisco, California. She was on a voyage from San Francisco to Port Stephens, Washington Territory.
Carolina	United Kingdom	The ship was damaged by fire at Liverpool, Lancashire.
Kingfisher	United States	The clipper sprang a leak during a voyage from San Francisco, California, to New York City. In distress, she put into port at Montevideo, Uruguay, where she was surveyed and condemned. However, she was sold locally in November 1871, and subsequently was repaired and returned to service as Jaime Ciblis (Uruguay).
Moldavian	United Kingdom	The ship was destroyed by fire at Taganrog, Russia.
Three Brothers	United Kingdom	The ship sprang a leak and was beached on Wangeroog, Germany, where she was wrecked. Her crew were rescued. She was on a voyage from London to Carolinensiel, Germany.
Ullswater	United Kingdom	The barque was wrecked on a reef off Robert, Martinique. She was on a voyage from Robert to Trinidad.

== 21 June ==
List of shipwrecks: 21 June 1871
Ship	State	Description
Amelia	(United Kingdom of Great Britain and Ireland) Grenada	The sloop was abandoned in the Atlantic Ocean. Her crew were rescued by Portena (Spain). Amelia was on a voyage from Grenada to Barbados.
City of Port-au-Prince	United States	The steamship was wrecked at Miragoâne, Haiti. She was on a voyage from New York, to Saint Domingo.
Stranger	United Kingdom	The pilot boat foundered between Aberthaw and Breaksea Point, Glamorgan. Her crew were rescued by Courier (United Kingdom).
Unie	United Kingdom	The ship was wrecked on Scatarie Island, Nova Scotia, Canada. She was on a voyage from Saint John, New Brunswick to Cow Bay, Nova Scotia.

== 22 June ==
List of shipwrecks: 22 June 1871
Ship	State	Description
Douglas	United Kingdom	The brigantine was run into by the steam yacht Palatine (United Kingdom) and sank in the River Thames at Erith, Kent.
Eclair	New Zealand	The 17-ton cutter was wrecked inside the mouth of the harbour at Tairua, New Zealand during a gale, likely because she was not carrying enough ballast.
Knight Errant	United Kingdom	The full-rigged ship broke up in a heavy gale off Tierra del Fuego. The full-rigged cargo ship Sam Cearns (United Kingdom) rescued 24 of her crew; five crewman from the two ships combined died during the rescue. Knight Errant was on a voyage from Liverpool, Lancashire to San Francisco, California.
Snaefell	(United Kingdom of Great Britain and Ireland) Isle of Man	The paddle steamer ran aground at Liverpool, Lancashire. She was on a voyage from Douglas to Liverpool. She was refloated, repaired, and returned to service.
Vigilant	United Kingdom	The ship was driven ashore at Aberffraw, Anglesey. Her crew were rescued. She was on a voyage from the Isle of Whithorn, Wigtownshire to Caernarfon.

== 23 June ==
List of shipwrecks: 23 June 1871
Ship	State	Description
G. W. Morris	Canada	The brig was wrecked at Aquilla. Her crew were rescued. She was on a voyage from Parrsboro, Nova Scotia to New York, United States.
Unnamed	Imperial Russian Navy	A submarine sank in the Bjerkesund off Kronstadt when her hull was crushed at a depth of 98 feet (30 m). She was raised in 1872 and taken in to Kronstadt.

== 24 June ==
List of shipwrecks: 24 June 1871
Ship	State	Description
Alexander	Sweden	The ship collided with another vessel and was driven ashore near Cimbritshamn. She was on a voyage from Kalmar to Copenhagen, Denmark.
Grecian Queen	United Kingdom	The schooner ran aground and heeled over at Helford, Cornwall. She was on a voyage from Helford to Cardiff, Glamorgan.
Primos	Spain	The barque was wrecked on the Seven Stones Reef with the loss of all but one of her crew. She was on a voyage from Havana, Cuba to Greenock, Renfrewshire, United Kingdom.
Semaphore	United Kingdom	The steamship was driven ashore on Burial Island, County Antrim. She was on a voyage from Liverpool, Lancashire to Londonderry. She was refloated and taken in to Belfast, County Antrim.

== 25 June ==
List of shipwrecks: 25 June 1871
Ship	State	Description
Ada	United Kingdom	The brig was driven ashore at Helsingør, Denmark. She was refloated and resumed her voyage.
Harris	United Kingdom	The yacht was wrecked at Malabrigo, Peru with some loss of life. There were at least three survivors.

== 26 June ==
List of shipwrecks: 26 June 1871
Ship	State	Description
Little Belle	(Dominion of Newfoundland) Newfoundland Colony	The schooner was driven ashore and wrecked on Belle Island with the loss of 42 of the 47 people on board. She was on a voyage from Saint John's to Conception Bay.
Sam Cearns	United Kingdom	The full-rigged cargo ship was wrecked off Tierra del Fuego in a heavy gale. All 60 people on board - 36 crew member from Sam Cairns and 24 survivors from the full-rigged ship Knight Errant (United Kingdom), which had foundered on 22 June – reached shore safely. Sam Cearns was on a voyage from Liverpool, Lancashire to San Francisco, California, United States.
Venus	Denmark	The schooner was driven ashore in the Oste. She was on a voyage from Newcastle upon Tyne, Northumberland, United Kingdom to Cuxhaven, Germany.
Unnamed	Germany	A barque was driven ashore in the Oste. She was refloated and resumed her voyage.

== 27 June ==
List of shipwrecks: 27 June 1871
Ship	State	Description
Allerton Packet	United Kingdom	The brig ran aground at Dunkirk, Nord. She was on a voyage from Middlesbrough, Yorkshire to Dunkirk.
Jane Kelly	United Kingdom	The schooner was wrecked on the Longsand, in the North Sea off the coast of Essex. Her crew were rescued by a French lugger. She was on a voyage from Newcastle upon Tyne, Northumberland to Dublin.
Prince of Wales	Siam	The ship foundered in the South China Sea with the loss of 51 of her 54 crew. She was on a voyage from Hong Kong to Bangkok.

== 28 June ==
List of shipwrecks: 28 June 1871
Ship	State	Description
Caroline Beeson	United Kingdom	The schooner ran aground at Dragør, Denmark. She was on a voyage from Riga, Russia to Caen, Calvados, France.
Heroine	United Kingdom	The schooner ran aground on the Haisborough Sands, in the North Sea off the coast of Norfolk and sank. Her crew took to a boat and got aboard the Haisborough Lightship ( Trinity House). Heroine was on a voyage from Sunderland, County Durham to Le Tréport, Seine-Inférieure, France.

== 29 June ==
List of shipwrecks: 29 June 1871
Ship	State	Description
Pilot	United Kingdom	The steamship ran aground off Kettleness, Yorkshire. Her passengers were taken off by a tug. She was on a voyage from London to Newcastle upon Tyne, Northumberland. She was refloated and resumed her voyage.
Red	United Kingdom	The schooner ran aground on the Nore. She was on a voyage from London to Wexford.
Union	Spain	The steamship collided with another steamship and was beached at Swansea, Glamorgan, United Kingdom. She was on a voyage from Rouen, Seine-Inférieure, France to Swansea. She was refloated and taken into a dry dock for repairs.

== 30 June ==
List of shipwrecks: 30 June 1871
Ship	State	Description
Agnes	United Kingdom	The schooner sprang a leak and caught fire at Dundee, Forfarshire. She was on a voyage from Lindisfarne, Northumberland to Dundee.
Unnamed	Netherlands	A steamship foundered in the English Channel 3 nautical miles (5.6 km) south of the Logan Rock, Cornwall, United Kingdom.

== Unknown date ==
List of shipwrecks: Unknown date in June 1871
Ship	State	Description
Agnes Banfield	United Kingdom	The barque was wrecked in the Strait of Sunda. Her crew were rescued. She was on a voyage from Manila, Spanish East Indies to New York and/or London.
Alexander	United Kingdom	The ship ran aground on Sandy Key. She was on a voyage from Matanzas, Cuba to Falmouth, Cornwall. She was later refloated and resumed her voyage.
Ana Christina	Sweden	The ship was lost at Laguna before 9 June. She was on a voyage from Laguna to Falmouth.
Annie Gray	United Kingdom	The ship ran aground on the Maplin Sand, in the North Sea off the coast of Essex. She was on a voyage from New York to London.
Areri Verniph	Russia	The ship was driven ashore at "Timbreck".
Auckland	Queensland	The steamship was wrecked on the Beware Reef, off Ram Head, Victoria. All on board were rescued.
Bellona	United States	The ship was abandoned at sea. Her crew were rescued. She was on a voyage from Callao, Peru to Charleston, South Carolina.
Bosphorus	United Kingdom	The steamship ran aground in the Dardanelles. She was on a voyage from Liverpool, Lancashire to Constantinople, Ottoman Empire. She was refloated and completed her voyage.
B. U. M. S.	United States	The ship was wrecked at Cerro Azul, Peru. She was on a voyage from Cerro Azul to San Francisco, California.
Caernarvon	United Kingdom	The barque was wrecked on the Longsand, in the North Sea off the coast of Essex. Her crew were rescued by Snowdrop (United Kingdom).
Cameleon	(United Kingdom of Great Britain and Ireland) Gibraltar	The ship foundered in the Atlantic Ocean (36°00′N 7°20′W) before 9 June. Her crew were rescued. She was on a voyage from Lisbon, Portugal to Casablanca, Morocco.
Carl Anna	Germany	The ship ran aground off "Tarneivitz". She was on a voyage from Danzig to Lübeck.
Caroline Beeson	United Kingdom	The schooner was driven ashore at Dragør, Denmark. She was on a voyage from Riga, Russia to Caen, Calvados, France.
Cave	United Kingdom	The brig ran aground off Læsø, Denmark. She was on a voyage from Flensburg to Danzig.
Chester	United Kingdom	The barque was wrecked in the Turks Islands.
Cidade de Belem	Portugal	The ship ran aground and was wrecked at Goa, Portuguese India. She was on a voyage from Goa to London.
Coila	United Kingdom	The ship ran aground off Amager, Denmark. She was on a voyage from Riga to London. She was refloated.
Courier	United Kingdom	The brig was driven ashore on Brier Island, Nova Scotia, Canada. She was on a voyage from London to Saint John, New Brunswick, Canada. She was refloated and taken in to Saint John, where she arrived on 11 June in a leaky condition.
Da Capo	Germany	The schooner foundered in the Atlantic Ocean 200 nautical miles (370 km) off Madeira. Her crew were rescued by Leango. (United Kingdom).
Daring	United Kingdom	The ship was lost. She was on a voyage from Cow Bay to Rockland, Nova Scotia.
Desalaberry	United Kingdom	The steamship was wrecked at Batiscan, Quebec.
Don Juan	Spain	The ship was destroyed by fire. She was on a voyage from Macao, China to Callao.
Edea	United Kingdom	The ship ran aground in the Dardanelles. She was on a voyage from Newcastle upon Tyne, Northumberland to Constantinople. She was refloated with assistance and resumed her voyage.
Eleanor	United Kingdom	The schooner ran aground on the Constable Bank, in the Irish Sea. She was refloated with assistance from the Rhyl Lifeboat and assisted to a safe anchorage.
Elizabeth	Denmark	The schooner collided with the steamship Shepperton (United Kingdom) at Antwerp, Belgium and was beached. She was refloated and taken in to Antwerp.
Emeline	Germany	The barque foundered in the Pacific Ocean. Her crew were rescued by Christina (Argentina).
Emily	United Kingdom	The ship was driven ashore at Berdyanski, Russia.
Emily Heyse	Belgium	The ship ran aground on the Spijker Plaat, in the North Sea off the Dutch coast. She was on a voyage from Saint Petersburg, Russia to Ghent, East Flanders.
Emma	United Kingdom	The ship ran aground at Hartlepool, County Durham. She was on a voyage from Exeter, Devon to Hartlepool.
European	United Kingdom	The ship was driven ashore near Longueuil, Quebec. She was on a voyage from Montreal, Quebec to Liverpool.
Excelsior	United Kingdom	The ship caught fire at North Shields, Northumberland and was scuttled.
Fanny	United Kingdom	The ship foundered off Cape Comorin, India with the loss of her captain. She was on a voyage from Rangoon, Burma to Bombay, India.
Ferdinand	Germany	The barque was severely damaged by fire at Baltimore, Maryland, United States.
Francisco	United States	The ship was driven ashore in St. Andrews Bay. She was on a voyage from Matanzas, to Pensacola, Florida.
Frederic	France	The ship was lost 25 leagues (75 nautical miles (139 km)) from Jacmel, Haiti. Her crew were rescued. She was on a voyage from Guadeloupe to "Carmew".
Georgina	United Kingdom	The schooner was wrecked on the Harry Furlongs, in the Irish Sea. She was on a voyage from Dublin to Runcorn, Cheshire.
Gezina de Boer	Netherlands	The ship was damaged by ice at Baltic Port, Russia. She was on a voyage from Newcastle upon Tyne to Saint Petersburg.
Godhaab	Sweden	The ship ran aground at Horsens, Denmark. She was on a voyage from Sundsvall to Texel, North Holland, Netherlands. She was refloated and resumed her voyage.
Good Design	United Kingdom	The ship was abandoned in the Pentland Firth with the loss of all but one of her crew. She was subsequently taken in to Wick, Caithness.
Gustav	Denmark	The ship was abandoned at sea. She was on a voyage from Middlesbrough, Yorkshire, United Kingdom to Aarhus.
Halvare	United States	The ship capsized at Saint John, New Brunswick.
Illinois	United States	The ship foundered. Her crew were rescued. She was on a voyage from New York to San Francisco.
Jenny Clark	United Kingdom	The ship was wrecked in the Abaco Islands. She was on a voyage from Saint John, New Brunswick to Havana, Cuba.
Joseph E. Eaton	United States	The ship was wrecked on East Caicos, Caicos Islands. She was on a voyage from New York to Havana, Cuba.
Josephine	(France) Saint Pierre	The ship was abandoned in a sinking condition before 8 June.
Judith	United Kingdom	The ship was driven ashore on Gotland, Sweden. She was on a voyage from Söderhamn, Sweden to Wisbech, Cambridgeshire. She was refloated and taken in to Helsingør, Denmark in a leaky condition.
Lady Beatrice	United Kingdom	The ship ran aground in the Dardanelles. She was on a voyage from Alexandria, Egypt to Constantinople. She was refloated and resumed her voyage.
Laimira	(Dominion of Newfoundland) Newfoundland Colony	The ship was wrecked at the Cutthroat Station, Labrador.
Lawsons	United Kingdom	The brig was driven ashore and wrecked near "Laase". She was on a voyage from Flensburg to Danzig.
Lochiel	Canada	The brigantine was driven ashore at Port Royal, Jamaica.
Louisiana	Canada	The schooner was driven ashore on Prince Edward Island.
Lucy	United States	The ship was driven ashore at Darien, Georgia. She was on a voyage from Havana to Savannah, Georgia.
Marchioness of Bute	United Kingdom	The ship ran aground on the Firm Grundet, in the Baltic Sea and was wrecked.
Mars	United States	The steamship was wrecked at Breaker Point. She was on a voyage from Hong Kong to Amoy, China.
Mauritius	Germany	The barque was lost before 12 June.
Mere de Famille	France	The ship was wrecked at Castillas Point. She was on a voyage from Marseille, Bouches-du-Rhône to Buenos Aires, Argentina.
Mersey	United Kingdom	The schooner was wrecked on the South Bishop, Pembrokeshire. Her crew were rescued by the St Justinian Lifeboat. She was on a voyage from Rotterdam South Holland, Netherlands to Runcorn, Cheshire.
Mingotto	Flag unknown	The brigantine was destroyed by fire at the mouth of the "Gadzer".
Nestor	United Kingdom	The steamship ran aground in the Suez Canal before 17 June. She was on a voyage from Liverpool to Penang, Straits Settlements. Nestor was later refloated and resumed her voyage.
Nova Scotia	Canada	The ship was wrecked on Beaver Island, Nova Scotia. She was on a voyage from Boston, Massachusetts United States to Quebec City.
Ocean Mail	United Kingdom	The ship was driven ashore on Cape Island, in the Strait of Sunda before 23 June.
Oriole	United States	The 280-ton whaling barque was crushed by ice and abandoned off the Siberian coast of Russia near Saint Lawrence Bay in Chukotka. She later was towed to Plover Bay on the southern coast of the Chukchi Peninsula in Siberia and abandoned again.
Otte Lumille	France	The ship ran aground in the Dardanelles. She was on a voyage from Taganrog, Russia to Dunkirk, Nord.
Palestine	United Kingdom	The steamship collided with Octavia (United Kingdom) at Falmouth, Cornwall and was severely damaged. She was beached.
Propontis	United Kingdom	The schooner was wrecked at Tierra del Fuego, Chile.
Provost	United Kingdom	The ship foundered in the Atlantic Ocean. She was on a voyage from Puerto Rico to Falmouth.
Queen	United Kingdom	The ship ran aground and capsized at Helford, Cornwall. She was on a voyage from Ipswich, Suffolk to Cardiff, Glamorgan.
Rap	Norway	The ship was abandoned in the Atlantic Ocean. Her crew were rescued by Perilla (United Kingdom). Rap was on a voyage from Newport, Monmouthshire, United Kingdom to New York.
Renfrewshire	United Kingdom	The steamship was driven ashore in the Groot Noordhollandsch Kanaal. She was on a voyage from Galaţi, Ottoman Empire to Amsterdam, North Holland, Netherlands.
Renown	United Kingdom	The ship ran aground on the Growler. She was on a voyage from Guernsey, Channel Islands to London. She was refloated and resumed her voyage.
Roman Empire	United Kingdom	The ship ran aground in the Hooghly River. She was on a voyage from Calcutta, India to London. She was refloated and resumed her voyage.
Selina Barrett	United Kingdom	The ship was wrecked whilst bound for Conception Bay, Newfoundland Colony.
St. Louis	France	The steamship was run into by the steamship Balbec (France) and sank at Havre de Grâce, Seine-Inférieure. Her crew were rescued.
Sutton	United Kingdom	The ship struck a sunken wreck. She was on a voyage from Great Yarmouth, Norfolk to Rouen, Seine-Inférieure. She was assisted in to Dover, Kent in a leaky condition.
Tenasserim	United Kingdom	The ship ran aground in the Hooghly River. She was on a voyage from Calcutta to Liverpool. She was refloated and resumed her voyage.
Tolima	Spain	The steamship exploded with the loss of fourteen lives. Eight people were severely wounded. She was on a voyage from Cartagena to Honda, United States of Colombia.
