= Ghoga =

- Village
- Location in Bihar, India
- Coordinates: 25°13′N 87°10′E
- Country: India
- State: Bihar
- District: Bhagalpur

Population (2001)
  - Total: 3,766

Languages
  - Official: Angika, Hindi
- Time zone: UTC+5:30 (IST)
- PIN: 813205
- Telephone code: 06429
- Vehicle registration: BH
- Shri Lalpati Gop

Ghoga is a census town in Bhagalpur district in the state of Bihar, India.

== Demographics ==
As of 2001 India census, Ghoga had a population of 3766. Males constitute 54% of the population and females 46%. Ghoga has an average literacy rate of 68%, higher than the national average of 59.5%: male literacy is 74%, and female literacy is 60%. In Ghoga, 16% of the population is under 6 years of age.

== General ==
Ghogha is a Village at the bank of river Ganges and is located between the cities of Bhagalpur and Kahalgaon. Pakkisarai is a village near to ghoga and comes under the jurisdiction of Ghoga Thana (sub police station). It is well connected to both the towns by road and train and is at a distance of about 11 kilometers from Kahalgaon and 24 kilometers from Bhagalpur. It is roughly a 15 minutes travel from Kahalgaon and 30–45 minutes travel from Bhagalpur. The growth of Kahalgaon NTPC and increase in the income level of Bhagalpur residents has resulted in a flourish of Brick Kilns in this small village. About half of these Brick Kilns are exactly located in the village of Pakkisarai. The main occupation of the village nevertheless is agriculture. The higher than average literacy of the village is due to the location of a number of small schools within walking distance to the village. Moreover, the Saint Joseph's School situated at Pakartalla, has become the primary educational organisation, providing high-quality education to the children of Ghoga and Pakkisarai. Vikramshila, located approximately 16 kilometers from Ghoga is a tourist attraction.
