= Sam Cearns =

History

United Kingdom
- Name: Sam Cearns
- Owner: 1864-1865 Wilson & Chambers' White Star Line, Liverpool; 1865-1871 Lancaster Ship Owners Co Ltd, Lancaster
- Builder: Scott & Co, Greenock, Scotland
- Yard number: 97
- Launched: 22 June 1864
- Identification: British ON 50264
- Fate: Wrecked 26 June 1871

General characteristics
- Tonnage: 1,422 GRT
- Length: 315.5 ft (96.2 m)
- Beam: 36.3 ft (11.1 m)
- Depth of hold: 25.0 feet (7.6 m)
- Sail plan: 3-masted full-rigged ship

Sam Cearns was a British ship-rigged sailing cargo ship and emigrant carrier, built in 1864. In 1871 she was wrecked near Tierra del Fuego after the crew members gallantly saved the crew of another windjammer Knight Errant.

== Description ==
The Sam Cearns was built in 1864 by Scott & Co at Cartsdyke, Greenock as Yard No 97 for H T Wilson & Chambers' White Star Line. She was built with an iron hull and rigged as a three-masted full-rigged ship. She was 315.5 feet in length, 36.3 feet in breadth and had a depth of hold of 25 feet; she measured 1402 Gross register tons. She was launched on 22 June 1864.

== Commercial service ==
She sailed from Liverpool on her maiden voyage with 367 passengers and 45 crew, arriving at Melbourne on 17 October 1864 after 80 days at sea, during which 4 passengers died. On 17 November 1864 Sam Cearns departed Hobsons Bay, Melbourne for Madras. After taking on a cargo of jute, linseed, cotton, and saltpeter, the Sam Cearns arrived at Liverpool from Calcutta on 13 August 1865. This maiden voyage could have been her last as she caught fire in the entrance lock, but it was successfully extinguished.

The Sam Cearns' second voyage to Melbourne from Liverpool for White Star Line took 88 days and arrived on 25 December 1865. Thereafter she traded more widely, including Sydney NSW, Port Chalmers and San Francisco.

== Final voyage ==
On this last voyage, the ship under Capt Frederick Williams had already suffered 30 days of smallpox and a near-mutiny when, off Tierra del Fuego, on 22 June 1871 she came upon the Liverpool ship Knight Errant about to break up in a heavy gale. Williams hove to and attempted to launch their lifeboat but this was destroyed by breaking seas; led by mate Edwin Wright with a volunteer crew, a second boat set off and took off all the crew of Knight Errant in three trips - on the last the boat was destroyed as it returned to Sam Cearns, the master of Knight Errant, mate Edwin Wright and five others were killed with only four getting on board; a search with Sam Cearns' last boat found no more alive - 24 from Knight Errant were saved.

In the aftermath, Sam Cearns herself was wrecked on 26 June 1871 in the same heavy gale but all aboard were able to get off via the rigging to shore. In driving snow they remained in a makeshift shelter for two weeks until they were able to hail a passing schooner (actually a wrecker's vessel). All sixty survivors were taken by the schooner to Port Stanley.

Capt Williams received the gold medal of the Liverpool Shipwreck & Humane Society and every volunteer member of the rescuing boat the silver medal, and a gratuity to the widow of the mate. Williams was absolved of all blame for the loss of Sam Cearns but was "tired of windjamming" and intended to go to a steamship line, where pay and conditions were better.
