= List of shipwrecks in January 1850 =

The list of shipwrecks in January 1850 includes ships sunk, foundered, wrecked, grounded, or otherwise lost during January 1850.

== 1 January ==
List of shipwrecks: January 1850
Ship	State	Description
Louisa	United Kingdom	The ship ran aground and was wrecked at Donegal. She was on a voyage from Liverpool, Lancashire to Ballyshannon, County Donegal.
Margaretha	(flag) Kingdom of Hanover	The ship was wrecked near "Hjortdall", Denmark. Her crew were rescued. She was on a voyage from Riga, Russia to Antwerp, Belgium.
Mary Ann	United Kingdom	The ship was scuttled at Fishguard, Pembrokeshire. She was refloated in mid-January.
Phoebe	United Kingdom	The brig foundered in the North Sea off Bridlington, Yorkshire. Her crew were rescued. She was on a voyage from South Shields, County Durham to London.

== 2 January ==
List of shipwrecks: 2 January 1850
Ship	State	Description
Anlaby	United Kingdom	The ship departed from the Charente for Liverpool, Lancashire. Presumed subsequently foundered in the Bristol Channel or Irish Sea with the loss of all hands: Two hogsheads of cognac that formed part of her cargo washed up on Walney Island, Lancashire in March 1851.
Anne	United Kingdom	The ship foundered in the North Sea off St. Abb's Head, Berwickshire. Her crew were rescued.
Cordouan	France	The ship was wrecked at Sainte-Rose, Île Bourbon.
Millman	United Kingdom	The whaler ran aground in the Gulf of Salonica. She was refloated with assistance from HMS Research (Royal Navy) and taken in to Salonica, Greece.
HMS Terrible	Royal Navy	The paddle frigate ran aground at Plymouth, Devon. She was on a voyage from Portsmouth, Hampshire to Lisbon, Portugal. She was refloated and taken in to Plymouth.

== 3 January ==
List of shipwrecks: 3 January 1850
Ship	State	Description
Alexander	United Kingdom	The ship ran aground on the Long Nose, off the north Kent coast. She was on a voyage from Liverpool, Lancashire to Whitstable, Kent. She was refloated and resumed her voyage.
East Kent	United Kingdom	The brig was driven ashore 2 nautical miles (3.7 km) north of Bridlington, Yorkshire. She was refloated the next day and taken in to Bridlington.
Elizabeth	United Kingdom	The ship was driven ashore on Sully Island, Glamorgan. her crew were rescued. She was on a voyage from Southampton, Hampshire to Newport, Monmouthshire.
John and Mary	United Kingdom	The brig was driven ashore at Filey Bridge, Yorkshire. She was refloated and resumed her voyage.
John and Susannah	United Kingdom	The sloop was driven ashore at Pakefield, Suffolk. She was refloated the next day and taken in to Lowestoft, Suffolk in a leaky condition.
Maid of Kent	United Kingdom	The ship was driven ashore near Bridlington. She was on a voyage from Rochester, Kent to Sunderland, County Durham.
Mary	United Kingdom	The sloop was driven ashore at North Somercotes, Lincolnshire. She was on a voyage from London to East Stockwith. Lincolnshire. She was refloated on 5 January and taken in to Grimsby, Lincolnshire.
Premium	United Kingdom	The brig was driven ashore at Filey Bridge. She was refloated and resumed her voyage.
Zebra	United Kingdom	The ship capsized at Plymouth, Devon. She was on a voyage from Jersey, Channel Islands to Plymouth.

== 4 January ==
List of shipwrecks: 4 January 1850
Ship	State	Description
Brave	United Kingdom	The brig was wrecked on the Navestone Rock, in the Farne Islands, Northumberland. Her crew were rescued. She was on a voyage from Inverness to Newcastle upon Tyne, Northumberland.
Deux Frères	France	The ship was driven ashore at Littlehampton, Sussex, United Kingdom. She was on a voyage from Rouen, Seine-Inférieure to Portsmouth, Hampshire, United Kingdom.
Edward Stanley	(United Kingdom of Great Britain and Ireland) New Zealand	The schooner foundered off Croixelles Harbour en route from Wanganui to Nelson.
European	United Kingdom	The schooner was wrecked near Casablanca, Morocco. Her crew were rescued.
Grog	(United Kingdom of Great Britain and Ireland) Jersey	The ship was in collision with a schooner and foundered off North Foreland, Kent. Her crew were rescued. She was on a voyage from Jersey to Hartlepool, County Durham.
Isabella	United Kingdom	The brigantine was driven ashore on "Basque Island". She was on a voyage from Quebec City, Province of Canada, British North America to London. She was consequently condemned.
Lady Lilford	United Kingdom	The ship was driven ashore at Équihen, Pas-de-Calais, France. She was on a voyage from Callao, Peru to Dundee, Forfarshire. She was refloated and resumed her voyage.

== 5 January ==
List of shipwrecks: 5 January 1850
Ship	State	Description
Eliza	United Kingdom	The ship was driven ashore and wrecked 2 nautical miles (3.7 km) east of Porthcawl, Glamorgan. Her crew were rescued. She was on a voyage from Neath to Porthcawl.
Ferdinand	United Kingdom	The ship ran aground and was damaged at Appledore, Devon. She was on a voyage from Bristol, Gloucestershire to Bordeaux, Gironde. She was refloated and taken in to Appledore for repairs.
Greyhound	Kingdom of Hawaii	The ship was wrecked near West Tamaki, New Zealand. She was on a voyage from Honolulu to Auckland, New Zealand.
Hannah	United Kingdom	The smack sprang a leak in the Bristol Channel off Lundy Island, Deven and was beached in Morte Bay, where she was wrecked. Her crew were rescued. She was on a voyage from Hayle, Cornwall to Newport, Monmouthshire.
Helen Catharina	Russia	The ship capsized in the Baltic Sea and was subsequently driven ashore near Ventava, Courland Governorate. She was on a voyage from Riga to Porto, Portugal.
Marchioness of Bute	United Kingdom	The ship was driven ashore and severely damaged at Belfast, County Antrim.
Regina	United Kingdom	The ship struck a sunken rock and was beached on the coast of Egypt. She was on a voyage from Alexandria, Egypt to a British port. She was refloated on 11 January and taken in to Alexandria.

== 6 January ==
List of shipwrecks: 6 January 1850
Ship	State	Description
Carries et Celestine	France	The ship was run ashore and wrecked at "Estardit", Spain. Her crew were rescued. She was on a voyage from Algiers, Algeria to Marseille, Bouches-du-Rhône, France.
Dartmouth	United Kingdom	The ship was destroyed by fire at Bombay, India.
Gierdina	Kingdom of Hanover	The galiot was in collision with Charlotte (United Kingdom) in the North Sea and was abandoned. Her crew were rescued by Charlotte. Gierdina was on a voyage from Horsens, Denmark to Newcastle upon Tyne, Northumberland, United Kingdom.
J. P. Whitney	United States	The ship ran aground in the Delaware River and was then run into by Allegheny (United States). She was on a voyage from Philadelphia, Pennsylvania to Liverpool, Lancashire, United Kingdom. She was refloated and resumed her voyage.
Royal Victoria	United Kingdom	The paddle steamer ran aground on the Gunfleet Sand, in the North Sea off the coast of Essex. She was on a voyage from London to Leith, Lothian. Royal Victoria was refloated on 8 January and resumed her voyage.
Talisman	United States	The ship was wrecked in the Cape Verde Islands with the loss of four of her crew. She was on a voyage from New York to Calcutta, India.

== 7 January ==
List of shipwrecks: 7 January 1850
Ship	State	Description
Prospero	United Kingdom	The ship was driven ashore at Tetney Haven, Lincolnshire. She was on a voyage from Woodbridge, Suffolk to Wakefield, Yorkshire.
Sultan	United Kingdom	The ship was wrecked on Beale's Island, Maine, United States. All on board were rescued. She was on a voyage from Liverpool, Lancashire to Saint John, New Brunswick, British North America.

== 8 January ==
List of shipwrecks: 8 January 1850
Ship	State	Description
Alida	Netherlands	The ship was wrecked on the Banjaard Sand, in the North Sea off the coast of Zeeland. Her crew were rescued. She was on a voyage from London, United Kingdom to Rotterdam, South Holland.
Archimedes	France	The ship was driven ashore and wrecked in Conception Bay with the loss of all hands. She was on a voyage from Havre de Grâce, Seine-Inférieure to Pernambuco, Brazil.
Cover	United Kingdom	The ship was driven ashore at Agrigento, Sicily.
Ouse	United Kingdom	The sloop was driven ashore at New Romney, Kent. She was on a voyage from Rotterdam, South Holland, Netherlands to Newhaven, Sussex. She was refloated on 10 January and taken in to Folkestone, Kent in a severely damaged condition.

== 9 January ==
List of shipwrecks: 9 January 1850
Ship	State	Description
Constitution	United Kingdom	The ship was driven ashore and wrecked at Southampton, New York, United States. All on board were rescued. She was on a voyage from Belfast, County Antrim to New York City.
Cove	United Kingdom	The ship was driven ashore at Agrigento, Sicily. She was consequently condemned.
Ferrucio	Kingdom of Sardinia	The ship was wrecked on the Isla del Aire, Spain. She was on a voyage from Tarragona, Spain to Genoa.
Francis	United Kingdom	The schooner caught fire and was scuttled at Cowes, Isle of Wight.
Hirondelle	(United Kingdom of Great Britain and Ireland) Jersey	The ship was in collision with the steamship Talbot (United Kingdom) in the Bristol Channel 5 nautical miles (9.3 km) south west of Nass Point. She capsized and was abandoned. She was on a voyage from Newfoundland, British North America to Jersey and Bristol, Gloucestershire. Hirondelle was taken in tow by Talbot on 12 January but the tow was abandoned. She came ashore at Aberdovey, Caernarfonshire on 7 February and was wrecked.
Union	United Kingdom	The ship was driven ashore and wrecked at Souter Point, County Durham. Her crew were rescued. She was on a voyage from South Shields, County Durham to Topsham, Devon.

== 10 January ==
List of shipwrecks: 10 January 1850
Ship	State	Description
Adele	France	The lugger was wrecked at Tacumshane, County Wexford, United Kingdom with the loss of four of her seven crew. She was on a voyage from Nantes, Loire-Inférieure to Liverpool, Lancashire, United Kingdom.
Paquete de Sitges	Spain	The ship was driven ashore near Punta Mala. She was on a voyage from Barcelona to St. Jago de Cuba, Cuba. She was refloated.
Post	United Kingdom	The schooner was in collision with Sea Nymph (United Kingdom) and sank in the Victoria Channel with the loss of her captain. Three survivors were rescued by Sea Nymph.

== 11 January ==
List of shipwrecks: 11 January 1850
Ship	State	Description
Aghios Nicholaos	Greece	The ship was driven ashore near Gallipoli, Ottoman Empire. She was on a voyage from Odesa to a British port.
Hottinguer	United States	The full-rigged ship ran aground and was wrecked on the Blackwater Bank, in Liverpool Bay. She was on a voyage from Liverpool, Lancashire, United Kingdom to New York. Hottinguer was refloated on 13 January and taken in tow for Dublin by the steamship Rose (United Kingdom). She was abandoned off Arklow, County Wicklow and subsequently struck the Glassgorman Bank and was wrecked with the loss of thirteen lives. Twenty crew were rescued. She was on a voyage from Liverpool to New York, United States. Part of the wreck subsequently came ashore near Dublin.
Isabel	United Kingdom	The schooner foundered in the Bristol Channel. Her four crew were rescued by the barque Huddersfield (United Kingdom). Isabel was on a voyage from Neath, Glamorgan to Dublin.
Jane	United Kingdom	The ship was driven ashore and severely damaged on Halifax Island, off the coast of Africa. She was refloated on 19 January and sailed for Saint Helena, where she arrived on 2 February.

== 12 January ==
List of shipwrecks: 12 January 1850
Ship	State	Description
Alexandrina	United Kingdom	The ship was driven ashore at Whitby, Yorkshire and ran into Gleam (United Kingdom).
Ayrshire	United Kingdom	With 201 passengers on board, the brig was wrecked with the loss of one life at "Squan Beach," a term used at the time for a 7-mile (11 km) stretch of the coast of New Jersey between Manasquan Inlet and Cranberry Inlet.
Ceritica	United Kingdom	The ship capsized at Newport, Monmouthshire. She was righted on 18 January.
Gipsy	United Kingdom	The brigantine was wrecked at Cape St. George, Newfoundland, British North America. She was on a voyage from Charlottetown, Prince Edward Island, British North America to London.
Gleam	United Kingdom	The ship was driven ashore at Whitby and ran into Hope (United Kingdom). She was severely damaged by fire, having arrived at Whitby on fire.
Hope	United Kingdom	The ship was driven ashore at Whitby and was then run into by Gleam (United Kingdom). She was severely damaged.
Mary Stephen	United Kingdom	The ship ran aground on the Doom Bay. She was on a voyage from Newport, Monmouthshire to Padstow, Cornwall. She was refloated and taken in to Padstow.
Perth	United Kingdom	The ship was driven ashore at Bridlington, Yorkshire. She was refloated and towed in to Bridlington by Avenger (United Kingdom).
Peruvian	United Kingdom	The ship was wrecked on Plum Pudding Island, off the coast of Africa. Her crew were rescued.
Sisters	United Kingdom	The ship was driven ashore at Whitby.
Sophia	Austrian Empire	The barque was driven ashore near Penarth Head, Glamorgan, United Kingdom. She was on a voyage from Newport, Monmouthshire, United Kingdom to Corfu Greece.
Youghal	United Kingdom	The schooner was driven ashore between Penzance and St. Michael's Point, Cornwall. She was on a voyage from Chichester, Sussex to Youghal, County Cork.

== 13 January ==
List of shipwrecks: 13 January 1850
Ship	State	Description
Circassian	United Kingdom	The ship was driven ashore at Broadstairs, Kent. She was on a voyage from London to Cádiz, Spain. She was refloated and towed back to London.
City of Exeter	United Kingdom	The schooner was in collision with a brig and foundered in the Irish Sea off the Tuskar Rock. Her crew were rescued by Ward (United Kingdom). City of Exeter was on a voyage from Liverpool, Lancashire to Gibraltar.
Eliza Sanders	United Kingdom	The ship was destroyed by fire off Cape Clear Island, County Donegal with the loss of a crew member. Survivors were rescued by Triconderago (United States. Eliza Sanders was on a voyage from Liverpool, Lancashire to Patras, Greece.
Enterprise	United Kingdom	The ship was driven ashore near Sunderland, County Durham.
George Alexander	United Kingdom	The ship ran aground in Loch Scridain. She was on a voyage from Sligo to Liverpool, Lancashire. She was refloated and beached on the Isle of Mull.
Gustave Adolph	Stralsund	The ship was driven ashore and wrecked near Wexford, United Kingdom. She was on a voyage from Stralsund to Liverpool.
Hans Jacob	Prussia	The ship ran aground off Romsø, Denmark. She was on a voyage from Leith, Lothian, United Kingdom to Kiel.
Joseph	United Kingdom	The smack was wrecked on the Black Rocks, off Inchkeith. Her crew survived. She was on a voyage from Buckie, Moray to Aberdeen.
Lydia	United Kingdom	The ship ran aground on the Drumrow Bank, in the Irish Sea off the coast of County Waterford. She was on a voyage from Liverpool to Saint Vincent, Virgin Islands. She was refloated and put in to Waterford.
Samuel Hicks	United States	The ship departed from the east coast of America for London. No further trace, presumed foundered with the loss of all hands.
Sophie Charlotte	United Kingdom	The ship ran aground and was damaged at Lillesand, Norway. She was on a voyage from Riga, Russia to London.
Visitor	(United Kingdom of Great Britain and Ireland) Guernsey	The ship ran aground and was damaged at Torquay, Devon. she was on a voyage from Guernsey to London.

== 14 January ==
List of shipwrecks: 14 January 1850
Ship	State	Description
Admiral Collingwood	United Kingdom	The schooner sprang a leak and was beached at Humersty, Yorkshire. She was on a voyage from King's Lynn, Norfolk to Hartlepool, County Durham.
Albert	France	The ship was lost off "Berie". She was on a voyage from Bordeaux, Gironde to Marseille, Bouches-du-Rhône.
Emily and Louisa	France	The brigantine was wrecked on the Long Sand, in Ross Bay, off the Irish coast with the loss of six of her eight crew. She was on a voyage from Galaţi, Ottoman Empire to Cork, United Kingdom.
Eliza	United Kingdom	The ship was driven ashore near the mouth of the Este. She was on a voyage from Newport, Monmouthshire to Hamburg.
Guy Mannering	United Kingdom	The ship ran aground at Liverpool, Lancashire. She was on a voyage from Liverpool to New York, United States. She was refloated and taken in to Liverpool in a severely damaged condition.
Gwenddolen	United Kingdom	The ship foundered 15 nautical miles (28 km) north east by east of the South Bishop Lighthouse, Pembrokeshire. Her crew were rescued. She was on a voyage from Barrow in Furness, Lancashire to Newport, Monmouthshire.
Johannes	Kingdom of Hanover	The ship was driven ashore by ice at Norden and was abandoned by her crew. She was on a voyage from Norden to Hull, Yorkshire, United Kingdom.
Jose Maria	Spain	The ship was wrecked near Cette, Hérault, France. She was on a voyage from Cullera to Marseille, Bouches-du-Rhône, France.
Marie Therese	United Kingdom	The ship was driven ashore at Arles, Bouches-du-Rhône. Her crew were rescued. She was on a voyage from Cardiff, Glamorgan, United Kingdom to Marseille.
Nouvelle Abeille	United Kingdom	The ship was lost off "Berie". She was on a voyage from Cartagena, Spain to Marseille.
Pearl	United Kingdom	The ship capsized at South Shields, County Durham. She was righted on 16 January.
Planet	United Kingdom	The ship ran aground and was damaged at Cardiff. She was on a voyage from Cardiff to Panama City.
Rigby	United Kingdom	The ship was driven ashore at Balbriggan, County Dublin. She was on a voyage from Runcorn, Cheshire to Newry, County Antrim.
Unica Hija	Spain	The ship was driven ashore at "Wittenbergen". She was on a voyage from Havana, Cuba to Hamburg. She was later refloated and beached near Twielenfleth, Kingdom of Hanover.
Vine	United Kingdom	The ship was wrecked at Whitby, Yorkshire. Her crew were rescued. She was on a voyage from Marstrand, Sweden to London.

== 15 January ==
List of shipwrecks: 15 January 1850
Ship	State	Description
Amaranthe	United Kingdom	The schooner was wrecked on the Gunfleet Sand, in the North Sea off the coast of Essex. Her six crew survived. She was on a voyage from Copenhagen, Denmark to London.
Ayrshire	United Kingdom	The ship was driven ashore and wrecked at Manasquan, New Jersey, United States with the loss of one life. She was on a voyage from Newry, County Antrim to Charleston, South Carolina, United States.
Cambria	United Kingdom	The ship was abandoned in the Atlantic Ocean. Her crew were rescued. She was on a voyage from Brest to Pont l'Abbé, Finistère, France.
Ebenezer	United Kingdom	The ship sank at the Mumbles, Glamorgan.
Edourd	France	The sloop was abandoned off Ouessant, Finistère. Her crew were rescued.
Happy Couple	United Kingdom	The ship was holed by an anchor and sank at the Mumbles.
Intrinsic	United Kingdom	The ship was wrecked on the Gingerbread Grounds. She was on a voyage from Liverpool, Lancashire to New Orleans, Louisiana, United States.
Joannes	Greece	The brig was driven ashore at Pwllheli, Caernarfonshire, United Kingdom She was on a voyage from Liverpool to Malta. She was refloated and taken in to Pwllheli.
Margaret	United Kingdom	The ship was driven ashore on Saltholm, Denmark. She was on a voyage from Pillau, Prussia to London. She was refloated and taken in to Copenhagen, Denmark, where she arrived on 5 February.
Mercury	(United Kingdom of Great Britain and Ireland) New South Wales	The schooner sank off Gellibrand Point. Her crew were rescued.
Ocean Queen	United Kingdom	The brig was driven ashore at the Landguard Fort, Harwich, Essex. She was on a voyage from Havre de Grâce, Seine-Inférieure, France to South Shields, County Durham She was refloated the next day and taken in to Harwich.
Pendennis	United Kingdom	The schooner ran aground at Bridlington, Yorkshire. Her crew were rescued by Carte's rocket apparatus.
Pepa	Spain	The schooner was wrecked at Esposende, Portugal. She was on a voyage from Valencia to Santander.
Therese Louise	Belgium	The ship was wrecked near Saint-Tropez, Var, France.

== 16 January ==
List of shipwrecks: 16 January 1850
Ship	State	Description
Catharina Charlotte	Russia	The brig foundered 6 nautical miles (11 km) south west of the Skellings Lighthouse, County Kerry, United Kingdom. Her eleven crew took to two boats; five of them landed on the coast of County Kerry; The other six were rescued by the schooner Blairs (United Kingdom). Catharina Charlotte was on a voyage from South Shields, County Durham, United Kingdom to Barcelona, Spain.
Jean and Grace	United Kingdom	The ship ran aground near the South Rock Lighthouse, County Antrim. She was on a voyage from Ardrossan, Ayrshire to Glasgow, Renfrewshire. She was refloated and put in to Portaferry, County Antrim.
Marvel	Greece	The schooner was driven ashore in Saint Tudwal's Islands, Pembrokeshire.
Tycho Wing	United Kingdom	The brig was wrecked on the Clews Rocks, off the coast of Cornwall with the loss of three of her seven crew. She was on a voyage from Galați, Ottoman Empire to London.

== 17 January ==
List of shipwrecks: 17 January 1850
Ship	State	Description
Providence	United Kingdom	The ship was driven ashore at Margate, Kent. She was on a voyage from Havre de Grâce, Seine-Inférieure, France to London. She was refloated the next day and taken in to Margate in a severely damaged condition.
Rosalie	France	The ship was lost whilst on a voyage from "Bongil" to Cette, Hérault.

== 18 January ==
List of shipwrecks: 18 January 1850
Ship	State	Description
Amanda	United Kingdom	The ship ran aground on the Lichfield Flats, off Demerara, British Guiana. She was refloated on 4 February and taken in to Demerara.
Dow D. Roop	(United Kingdom of Great Britain and Ireland) British North America	The ship was wrecked on reefs south of Saint Croix, Virgin Islands. She was on a voyage from Antigua to Saint Thomas, Virgin Islands.
Dussan	United Kingdom	The brig ran aground off Blackwater, County Wexford. She floated off and was abandoned. She was on a voyage from Sligo to Troon, Ayrshire. She was taken in to Campbeltown, Argyllshire on 21 January.
Principe Alberto	Spain	The ship ran aground off Holyhead, Anglesey, United Kingdom. She was on a voyage from the Clyde to Havana, Cuba. She was refloated.
Sarah	United Kingdom	The ship was run ashore and wrecked in Constantine Bay, Cornwall. Her crew were rescued. She was on a voyage from Messina, Sicily to London.
Thomas Crisp	United Kingdom	The ship was wrecked on the Morte Rocks, off the coast of Cornwall with the loss of a crew member. Survivors were rescued by the steamship Cornwall (United Kingdom). Thomas Crisp was on a voyage from Bristol, Gloucestershire to Barbados.
Utility	United Kingdom	The ship ran aground on the Bahama Bank, in the Irish Sea and sank. Her crew were rescued. She was on a voyage from Glasgow, Renfrewshire to Runcorn, Cheshire.

== 19 January ==
List of shipwrecks: 19 January 1850
Ship	State	Description
Albion	United Kingdom	The ship was driven ashore near Blyth, Northumberland. Her crew were rescued. She was refloated on 22 January and taken in to Blyth.
Eliza	United Kingdom	The ship was in collision with Fortune (United Kingdom) and foundered in the Irish Sea off the Baker's Bank Lightship ( Trinity House). Her crew were rescued. She was on a voyage from Whitehaven, Cumberland to Dublin.
Immagonda Sarah Clarina	Netherlands	The full-rigged ship was in collision with New Foresr (United Kingdom) in the English Channel off St. Alban's Head, Dorset and was severely damaged. She was on a voyage from Batavia, Netherlands East Indies to Amsterdam, North Holland. She was towed in to Portsmouth, Hampshire for repairs.
Jane Allison	(United Kingdom of Great Britain and Ireland) British North America	The brig was driven ashore in the Herring Gut. She was on a voyage from Saint John, New Brunswick, British North America to Boston, Massachusetts, United States.
Jane and Grace	United Kingdom	The ship ran aground on the North Rock, in the Irish Sea off the coast of County Antrim. She was on a voyage from Saltcoats, Ayrshire to Dublin. She was refloated and resumed her voyage.
Maria	Norway	The ship was wrecked near Christiansand. She was on a voyage from Bergen to Tromsø.
Mary Ann	United Kingdom	The ship was destroyed by fire. Her crew were rescued by Commerce (United Kingdom). She was on a voyage from Cádiz, Spain to Carbonear, Newfoundland, British North America.
Norfolk	United Kingdom	The ship struck a rock and sank in Blenneck Sound. She was on a voyage from Glasgow, Renfrewshire to Sligo.

== 20 January ==
List of shipwrecks: 20 January 1850
Ship	State	Description
Ann	United Kingdom	The smack was wrecked in Rackham Bay, Devon. Her crew were rescued.
Betsey	United Kingdom	The ship was driven ashore at Souter Point, County Durham. Her crew were rescued. She was on a voyage from Great Yarmouth, Norfolk to Newcastle upon Tyne, Northumberland.
Cato	United Kingdom	The ship sank off Stranton, County Durham. Her crew survived.
Geister Adolph	Prussia	The brig was driven ashore and wrecked at "Ballyhire", Ireland. Her eleven crew were rescued. She was on a voyage from Königsberg to Liverpool, Lancashire, United Kingdom.
Good Intent	United Kingdom	The ship was driven ashore in Saint Tudwal's Islands, Pembrokeshire. Her crew were rescued.
Henry	United Kingdom	The ship was driven ashore and sank east of Aberavon, Glamorgan. She was refloated on 27 January and taken in to Port Talbot, Glamorgan.
Intrepid	United Kingdom	The Barking smack was wrecked on the Shipwash Sand, in the North Sea off the coast of Essex with the loss of all hands. Her captain was rescued by the smack Mary (United Kingdom), but died before he could be taken ashore.
L. Z.	United Kingdom	The ship foundered in the Atlantic Ocean. All 75 people on board were rescued by Manetta (United States). L. Z. was on a voyage from New York, United States to Liverpool.
Manetta	United States	The ship was wrecked on the Long Bar, off the west coast of Bermuda. All on board were rescued. She was on a voyage from Bath, Maine to Havana, Cuba.
Old England	United Kingdom	The ship was driven ashore in Abergele Bay. She was on a voyage from Liverpool to Antwerp, Belgium. She was refloated and resumed her voyage.
Pauline Houghton	United Kingdom	The ship ran aground on the Wedge Sand, in the North Sea off the coast of Kent and was wrecked. She was on a voyage from Mauritius to London.
Petronella	Spain	The barque was wrecked on Cape San Antonio, Cuba.
Willamet	France	The ship was wrecked on the Anegada Reef. She was on a voyage from Marseille, Bouches-du-Rhône to New Orleans, Louisiana, United States.

== 21 January ==
List of shipwrecks: 21 January 1850
Ship	State	Description
Active	United Kingdom	The ship was driven ashore at the Mumbles, Glamorgan.
Annabella	United Kingdom	The ship ran aground on the Stag Rocks, off the coast of County Cork and was severely damaged. She was refloated.
Economist	(United Kingdom of Great Britain and Ireland) British North America	The ship capsized in the Atlantic Ocean. Her crew were rescued by Elsinore (flag unknown). She was on a voyage from Norfolk, Virginia, United States to Demerara, British Guiana.
Jemima	United Kingdom	The ship was driven ashore and severely damaged at Derbyhaven, Isle of Man. She was on a voyage from Liverpool, Lancashire to South Shields, County Durham. She was refloated and taken in to Castletown, Isle of Man.
Marie Ann	France	The lugger struck the Manacles and sank with the loss of three of her six crew. She was on a voyage from Morlaix, Finistère to Cardiff, Glamorgan, United Kingdom.
Nancy	United Kingdom	The ship ran aground on the Cross Sand, in the North Sea off the coast of Norfolk. She was refloated and assisted in to Great Yarmouth, Norfolk.
Union	United Kingdom	The ship was driven ashore at Ness Point, Suffolk.
Vrouw Maartje	Netherlands	The ship was driven ashore at Scharendijke, Zeeland. She was on a voyage from Bilbao, Spain to Rotterdam, South Holland. She was refloated on 29 January and taken in to Brouwershaven, Zeeland.

== 22 January ==
List of shipwrecks: 22 January 1850
Ship	State	Description
Elizabeth	United Kingdom	The ship was driven ashore and wrecked near Charleston, South Carolina, United States. Her crew were rescued. She was on a voyage from Liverpool, Lancashire to Charleston.
Friendship	United Kingdom	The brig was driven ashore and wrecked at Spiddal, County Galway.

== 23 January ==
List of shipwrecks: 23 January 1850
Ship	State	Description
Duncan Dunbar	United Kingdom	The ship was driven ashore at Wells-next-the-Sea, Norfolk.
Lord Seaton	United Kingdom	The ship ran aground on the Loggerhead Reef, off the Dry Tortugas. She was on a voyage from New Orleans, Louisiana, United States to Liverpool, Lancashire. She was later refloated and taken in to Key West, Florida, United States, where sher arrived on 8 February.

== 24 January ==
List of shipwrecks: 24 January 1850
Ship	State	Description
Mill Bay	United Kingdom	The ship was driven ashore at South Foreland, Kent. She was on a voyage from São Miguel Island, Azores to London. She was refloated and resumed her voyage.

== 25 January ==
List of shipwrecks: 25 January 1850
Ship	State	Description
Etoile	France	The ship was lost at Port Louis, Guadeloupe.
Gipsy	United Kingdom	The brig ran aground on the Haisborough Sands, in the North Sea off the coast of Norfolk. She was on a voyage from Sunderland, County Durham to London. She was refloated.
Golden Grove	United Kingdom	The ship was in collision with the brig Norham Castle (United Kingdom) 15 nautical miles (28 km) north of Cromer, Norfolk and was abandoned by her crew, who were rescued by Norham Castle. Golden Grove was reboarded the next day and taken in to by Norham Castle, which transferred the tow to the smack Active off Great Yarmouth. She was towed in to Lowestoft, Suffolk in a waterlogged condition.
Margaret	United Kingdom	The ship was driven ashore by ice on Saltholm, Denmark. She was on a voyage from Pillau, Prussia to London.
Matilda	United Kingdom	The schooner caught fire and was scuttled at Newport, Monmouthshire. She was refloated on 27 January.
Minerva	United Kingdom	The ship ran aground on the Scroby Sands, Norfolk. She was refloated and resumed her voyage.
Old Harry	United Kingdom	The schooner ran aground on the Barber Sand, in the North Sea off the coast of Norfolk. She was on a voyage from Blyth, Northumberland to Rochester, Kent. She was refloated and taken in to Wells-next-the-Sea.
Rose	United Kingdom	The ship was driven ashore at Wells-next-the-Sea, Norfolk.

== 26 January ==
List of shipwrecks: 26 January 1850
Ship	State	Description
Amizade	Portugal	The ship was driven ashore and wrecked south of Figueira da Foz. She was on a voyage from São Miguel Island, Azores to Figueira da Foz.
Anna Maria	United Kingdom	The brig collided with the barque Ben Nevis (United Kingdom) and foundered in the North Sea off Southwold, Suffolk with the loss of all but one of her crew. Anna Maria was on a voyage from South Shields, County Durham to London. Two crew of Ben Nevis were drowned.
Argent	United Kingdom	The ship ran aground in Strangford Lough.
Betsey	United Kingdom	The ship was driven ashore and wrecked Between Burnham Overy Staithe and Brancaster, Norfolk.
Emma and Minna	Prussia	The ship was run aground and sank off Anholt. Her crew were rescued. She was on a voyage from Grangemouth, Stirlingshire, United Kingdom to Griefswald.
Matthews	United Kingdom	The brig was driven ashore in the River Nene at Wisbech, Cambridgeshire. She was on a voyage from Sunderland, County Durham to Wisbech.
Minerva	United Kingdom	The ship was holed by an anchor and sank at Figueira da Foz.
Palmyra	United Kingdom	The East Indiaman was wrecked at Le Touquet, Pas-de-Calais, France. All 21 people on board were rescued. She was on a voyage from Canton, China to London.
Sabine	(United Kingdom of Great Britain and Ireland) New South Wales	The ship was wrecked on a reef off Upolu, Samoa. All on board were rescued. She was on a voyage from Sydney to Alta California.
Violet	United Kingdom	The ship was driven ashore in the River Nene at Wisbech.
Wabourne	United Kingdom	The sloop was driven ashore at Wells-next-the-Sea, Norfolk. She was refloated on 29 January.
Why-Not	United Kingdom	The ship ran aground on the Goodwin Sands, Kent. She was on a voyage from Newcastle upon Tyne, Northumberland to Tenerife, Canary Islands. She was refloated and anchored off the North Foreland.

== 27 January ==
List of shipwrecks: 27 January 1850
Ship	State	Description
Ohio	United Kingdom	The ship ran aground on the Shipwash Sand, in the North Sea off the coast of Essex. She was on a voyage from Newcastle upon Tyne, Northumberland to Constantinople, Ottoman Empire. She was refloated and taken in to Harwich, Essex.
Stagshaw	United Kingdom	The brig was driven ashore at Sandgate, Kent and was abandoned. She was on a voyage from Sunderland, County Durham to Havana, Cuba. She was refloated the next day but sank whilst making for Folkestone, Kent.
Vladimer	France	The ship departed from La Rochelle, Charente-Maritime for New York, United States. No further trace, presumed foundered with the loss of all hands.

== 28 January ==
List of shipwrecks: 28 January 1850
Ship	State	Description
Abeona	United Kingdom	The ship ran aground on the Newcombe Sand, in the North Sea off the coast of Norfolk. She was refloated.
Agnes	United Kingdom	The ship ran aground on the Car Rock. She was on a voyage from Aberdeen to Glasgow, Renfrewshire. She was refloated and taken in to Arbroath, Forfarshire in a severely leaky condition.
Economy	United Kingdom	The ship sprang a leak and foundered in the Irish Sea off Holyhead, Anglesey. She was on a voyage from Aberystwyth, Cardiganshire to Chester, Cheshire.
Emulous	United Kingdom	The brig ran aground on the Gunfleet Sand, in the North Sea off the coast of Essex. She was on a voyage from South Shields, County Durham to London. She was refloated and taken in to Wivenhoe, Essex.
Endymion	United Kingdom	The barque was wrecked on the Newcombe Sand. Her crew were rescued by the Pakefield Lifeboat. She was on a voyage from London to Newcastle upon Tyne, Northumberland.
Enterprise	United Kingdom	The ship was driven ashore at North Somercotes, Lincolnshire. She was on a voyage from Hull, Yorkshire to Spalding, Lincolnshire.
Fidelite	France	The ship was wrecked near "Flora".
Isabella	United Kingdom	The ship ran aground and damaged on the West Barrows Sand, in the North Sea off the coast of Essex. She was on a voyage from London to Liverpool, Lancashire. She was refloated.
Johanna	Kingdom of the Two Sicilies	The ship was driven ashore at Gallipoli, Ottoman Empire. She was reported to be on a voyage from Naples to Vlissingen, Zeeland, Netherlands. She broke up on 8 February.
Laurentine	United Kingdom	The ship ran aground and was damaged at Weymouth, Dorset. She was on a voyage from São Miguel Island, Azores to Weymouth. She was refloated and taken in to Weymouth.
Margaret	United Kingdom	The sloop sprang a leak and was abandoned in the Humber. She was on a voyage from Grimsby, Lincolnshire to Bradford, Yorkshire. She was towed in to Hull by the tug Lioness (United Kingdom).
Margery	United Kingdom	The ship was wrecked on the Ross Sands, in the North Sea south of Lindisfarne, Northumberland. Her crew were rescued by a lifeboat. She was on a voyage from Newcastle upon Tyne to Dundee, Forfarshire.
Maria	United Kingdom	The brig sprang a leak and was beached at Cairnryan, Wigtownshire. She was on a voyage from Londonderry to Runcorn, Cheshire.
Mary Pauline	France	The ship was wrecked near "Stora". She was on a voyage from Rouen, Seine-Inférieure to Philippeville, Algeria.
Odile	France	The ship was wrecked at Boulogne, Pas-de-Calais. She was on a voyage from Livorno, Grand Duchy of Tuscany to Dunkirk, Nord.
Omega	United Kingdom	The ship ran aground on the Buxey Sand, in the North Sea off the coast of Essex. She was on a voyage from London to Southwold, Suffolk. She was refloated and taken in to Wivenhoe.
Premier	United Kingdom	The ship ran aground on the Maplin Sand, in the North Sea off the coast of Essex. She was on a voyage from London to Newcastle upon Tyne, Northumberland. She was refloated and taken in to Harwick.
Snap	(United Kingdom of Great Britain and Ireland) Isle of Man	The smack was run into and sunk by a sloop at Ramsey. She was on a voyage from Whitehaven, Cumberland to Castletown, Isle of Man.

== 29 January ==
List of shipwrecks: 29 January 1850
Ship	State	Description
Agger Canal	United Kingdom	The ship was driven ashore by ice at Thisted, Denmark and was damaged. She was on a voyage from London to Thisted. She was refloated on 1 February.
Confucius	United Kingdom	The ship was driven ashore at King's Lynn, Norfolk.
Emma and Minna	Prussia	The ship was wrecked on a reef east of Anholt, Denmark. Her crew were rescued. She was on a voyage from Grangemouth, Stirlingshire, United Kingdom to Griefswald.
Helene	United Kingdom	The ship was driven ashore at King's Lynn.
John and Catherine	United Kingdom	The ship ran aground and was damaged on the North Bank, in the Bristol Channel. She was on a voyage from Swansea, Glamorgan to Liverpool, Lancashire.
Navy	United Kingdom	The ship was driven ashore at King's Lynn.
Nutcut	United Kingdom	The schooner was wrecked on Île Bourbon with the loss of all but three of her crew. She was on a voyage from Mauritius to Table Bay.
Packet	United Kingdom	The ship was wrecked in the Santa Cruz River. She was on a voyage from the Clyde to Patagonia, Argentina.
Rhode Island	United States	The steamship broke in two and sank in the Gulf of Mexico with the loss of 50 of the 80 people on board. Ten survivors took to the long boat; they were rescued two days later by the schooner Mary Anne (United States). The other twenty survivors took to the jolly boat.
Robert and Betsey	United Kingdom	The ship was driven ashore at King's Lynn.
Speculation	United Kingdom	The ship was driven ashore at King's Lynn.
Susan	United Kingdom	The ship ran aground off "Cape Cabedillo", Brazil. She was on a voyage from Liverpool to Pernambuco and Paraíba, Brazil. She had been refloated by 16 February and taken in to Pernambuco for repairs.

== 30 January ==
List of shipwrecks: 30 January 1850
Ship	State	Description
Arrow	United Kingdom	The ship was driven ashore at Portsmouth, Hampshire. She was on a voyage from Sunderland, County Durham to Portsmouth. She was refloated the next day and taken in to Portsmouth in a leaky condition.
Brothers	United Kingdom	The ship was abandoned off Howth, County Dublin. She was on a voyage from Killough, County Louth to Dublin. She was later reboarded and taken in to Dublin.
London	Hamburg	The schooner was discovered abandoned off Neufeld, Duchy of Schleswig and taken in to that port.
Sarah	United Kingdom	The sloop was driven ashore at Wells-next-the-Sea, Norfolk with the loss of three lives. She was on a voyage from Gainsborough, Lincolnshire to Wells-next-the-Sea. She was refloated.
Sardine	United Kingdom	The ship ran aground on the Demeany Reef. She was refloated and taken in to Dundalk, County Louth in a leaky condition.

== 31 January ==
List of shipwrecks: 31 January 1850
Ship	State	Description
Abbotsford	United Kingdom	The ship put in to Penang, Malaya with her cargo of coal on fire. She ran aground and was severely damaged. She was on a voyage from London to Singapore. She was consequently condemned.
Devonshire	United States	The ship was driven ashore between Broadstairs and North Foreland, Kent, United Kingdom. Her passengers were landed. She was on a voyage from London to New York. Devonshire was refloated on 1 February and taken in to Margate, Kent.
Fairfax	United Kingdom	The ship was driven ashore in Ballyteague Bay. Her crew were rescued. She was on a voyage from Sierra Leone to Liverpool, Lancashire.
Horatio	United Kingdom	The ship was driven ashore at Kilmore, County Wexford. Her crew survived. She was on a voyage from Alexandria, Egypt to Wexford.
Seraphim	United Kingdom	The brig was wrecked on the Greek coast.
Three Brothers	United Kingdom	The schooner sank off the Dudgeon Sandbank, in the North Sea. Her crew were rescued by the schooner Whitby (United Kingdom). Three Brothers was on a voyage from Liverpool, Lancashire to Newcastle upon Tyne, Northumberland.
Wilhamet	United States	The ship was wrecked off Tortola. She was on a voyage from Marseille, Bouches-du-Rhône, France to New Orleans, Louisiana.

== Unknown date ==
List of shipwrecks: Unknown date in January 1850
Ship	State	Description
Anna Lucy	United Kingdom	The ship was wrecked on the coast of France.
Blossom	United Kingdom	The ship foundered in the North Sea off the coast of Suffolk before 16 January. She was on a voyage from Newcastle upon Tyne, Northumberland to Aberdeen.
Buche	Belgium	The ship was wrecked on "Schiro Island" in late January. Her crew were rescued. She was on a voyage from Antwerp to Constantinople, Ottoman Empire.
Diana	Netherlands	The ship was driven ashore on Schouwen, Zeeland. She was on a voyage from London, United Kingdom to Rotterdam, South Holland, Netherlands. She was refloated and taken in to Zeirikzee, Zeeland in a severely leaky condition.
Dorothy	United Kingdom	The brig foundered in the North Sea off the coast of Nord, France before 4 January.
Drongon	India	The ship was wrecked in Venloos Bay before 15 January. Her crew were rescued. She was on a voyage from Calcutta to Bombay.
Emile	France	The ship was driven ashore near Gonneville, Manche before 22 January. Her crew were rescued. She was on a voyage from Bordeaux, Gironde to Cherbourg, Seine-Inférieure.
Ermeta	Trieste	The ship wrecked at Ragusa, Sicily. Her crew were rescued. She was on a voyage from Trieste to London. She was refloated on 17 July.
Estrelle	France	The ship was driven ashore at Gibraltar between 13 and 15 January.
Henri	France	The ship was lost off Ouessant, Finistère.
Jane	United Kingdom	The ship foundered off Zuydcoote, Nord. Her crew were rescued. She was on a voyage from South Shields, County Durham to Constantinople.
Lady Rowley	United Kingdom	The ship was driven ashore at Gibraltar between 13 and 15 January. She had been refloated by 27 January.
London	United Kingdom	The ship foundered in the North Sea.
Lydford	United Kingdom	The ship ran aground on the Sugar Bank, off the coast of British Guiana and was abandoned by her crew.
Mary Bridge	United Kingdom	The ship was driven ashore in the Dry Tortugas before 20 January. She was on a voyage from Gibraltar to New Orleans, Louisiana, United States. She was refloated and taken in to Key West, Florida, United States.
Mary Welch	United Kingdom	The ship was driven ashore at Fano, Papal States before 30 January. She was later refloated and put in to Ancona, where she arrived on 8 February.
Nancy	France	The ship was lost at the mouth of the Somme.
Norma	Spain	The brig was abandoned in the Mediterranean Sea before 18 January.
Nouvelle Abeille	France	The ship was lost at the mouth of the Rhône before 29 January.
Panajta	Greece	The ship was wrecked in the Black Sea before 2 January.
Planet	United Kingdom	The brig was wrecked on the coast of France.
Prince of Brazil	United Kingdom	The ship foundered in the North Sea off the coast of Suffolk before 17 January.
Rosalie	Belgium	The ship was wrecked on the coast of Spain before 25 January.
Rose	United Kingdom	The ship was wrecked near Bône, Algeria before 22 January. Her crew were rescued. She was on a voyage from Gibraltar to Genoa, Kingdom of Sardinia.
Samuel	United Kingdom	The schooner foundered on or before 18 January. Her crew took to a boat and were rescued by New Hampshire (United States). Samuel was on a voyage from Porthcawl, Glamorgan to Cork.
San Nicolo	Greece	Captain Baziotis's ship was wrecked in the Black Sea before 2 January.
San Nicolo	Greece	Captain Cazionjani's ship was wrecked in the Black Sea before 2 January.
San Nicolo	Greece	Captain Cotelli's ship was wrecked in the Black Sea before 2 January.
Saphiro	Greece	The ship was wrecked in the Black Sea before 2 January.
St. Malo	France	The ship was driven ashore near Cette, Hérault before 22 January. She was abandoned by her crew, who were rescued. She was on a voyage from Constantinople to Marseille, Bouches-du-Rhône.
Trois Frères Unis	France	The ship was driven ashore at Fort Penthivière, Saint-Pierre-Quiberon, Morbihan before 22 January. She was on a voyage from Nantes, Loire-Inférieure to Lorient, Morbihan.
Union	United Kingdom	The ship was driven ashore near "Torocks", Denmark between 13 and 19 January. She was on a voyage from Helsingør, Denmark to Dunkirk, Nord, France.
Vigilant	United Kingdom	The ship was driven ashore at Gibraltar between 13 and 15 January. She had been refloated by 27 January.
Waldemar	United Kingdom	The ship was abandoned in the North Sea before 22 January. She was on a voyage from London to Newcastle upon Tyne.
