= List of shipwrecks in February 1848 =

The list of shipwrecks in February 1848 includes ships sunk, foundered, wrecked, grounded, or otherwise lost during February 1848.

== 1 February ==
List of shipwrecks: 1 February 1848
| Ship | State | Description |
|---|---|---|
| Ashley | United Kingdom | The ship ran aground on the Maplin Sand, in the North Sea off the coast of Essex. She was on a voyage from Ostend, Belgium to London. She had become a wreck by 5 February. |
| Avalon | United Kingdom | The ship foundered off Saint John's, Newfoundland, British North America with the loss of five of hern crew. |
| Catherine | Norway | The ship was abandoned in the North Sea off the coast of South Holland, Netherlands with the loss of a crew member. She was on a voyage from Hull, Yorkshire, United Kingdom to a Norwegian port. |
| Deo Gloria | Hamburg | The ship sank off Neuwerk. Her crew were rescued. She was on a voyage from Glasgow, Renfrewshire, United Kingdom to Hamburg. |
| Rapid | United Kingdom | The ship was driven ashore and damaged at Marseille, Bouches-du-Rhône. She was on a voyage from Newport, Monmouthshire to Barcelona, Spain and Marseille. She was refloated and taken in to Marseille. |

== 2 February ==
List of shipwrecks: 2 February 1848
| Ship | State | Description |
|---|---|---|
| Admiral Blake | United Kingdom | The ship ran aground on Scroby Sands, Norfolk and sank. Her crew were rescued. She was on a voyage from Hartlepool, County Durham to London. |
| Bagnell | United Kingdom | The ship ran aground on the Gunfleet Sand, in the North Sea off the coast of Essex. She was on a voyage from Wisbech, Cambridgeshire to London. She was refloated and taken in to Harwich, Essex. |
| Frances Weston | United Kingdom | The ship was driven ashore and wrecked at Trondheim, Norway. Her crew were rescued. She was on a voyage from Liverpool, Lancashire to South Shields, County Durham. |
| Freedom | United Kingdom | The ship ran aground on the Park Bank. She was on a voyage from Newport, Isle of Wight to Southampton, Hampshire. |
| James | United Kingdom | The brig foundered off the Owers Sandbank, in the English Channel off the coast of Sussex. Her eight crew were rescued. She was on a voyage from Newcastle upon Tyne, Northumberland to Galway. |
| Orwell | (United Kingdom of Great Britain and Ireland) New Zealand | The barque was wrecked at Manukau Harbour, New Zealand. All on board were rescued. She was on a voyage from Twofold Bay to Auckland. |
| Phoenix | Norway | The ship was driven ashore at Trondheim. She was on a voyage from Trondheim to Ålesund. |
| Rosebud | United Kingdom | The sloop was in collision with another sloop and foundered in the English Channel off Dover, Kent. Her crew were rescued. She was on a voyage from London to Newhaven, Sussex. |

== 3 February ==
List of shipwrecks: 3 February 1848
| Ship | State | Description |
|---|---|---|
| Alliance | United Kingdom | The ship struck a sunken rock and foundered in the English Channel off Saint-Vaast-la-Hougue, Manche, France. She was on a voyage from Guernsey, Channel Islands to Shoreham-by-Sea, Sussex. |
| Jane | United Kingdom | The ship ran aground and was damaged at "Bale". She was on a voyage from Kilrush, County Clare to the Clyde. She was refloated. |
| Mary Ann Cook | United Kingdom | The ship was in collision with another vessel and was beached at Bridlington, Yorkshire. She was refloated on 5 February and taken in to Bridlington in a severely damaged condition. |
| Robert | (United Kingdom of Great Britain and Ireland) British North America | The ship was abandoned in the Atlantic Ocean with some loss of life. Survivors were rescued by Frances Partridge (United Kingdom). Robert was on a voyage from Saint Andrews, New Brunswick to Jamaica. |

== 4 February ==
List of shipwrecks: 4 February 1848
| Ship | State | Description |
|---|---|---|
| Agile | United Kingdom | The ship ran aground in Crow Sound, Isles of Scilly. She was refloated and taken in to St. Mary's, Isles of Scilly. |
| Almade | United Kingdom | The ship ran aground on the Goodwin Sands, Kent. She was on a voyage from London to Newport, Monmouthshire. She was refloated and anchored off North Foreland, Kent. |
| Augusta | Norway | The ship was driven ashore on the Norwegian coast. She was on a voyage from Bergen to a Mediterranean port. She was refloated and put back to Bergen. |
| Bruderliebe | Danzig | The ship was wrecked near "Linas", north of Trondheim, Norway. she was on a voyage from Danzig to an English port. |
| John Martin | United Kingdom | The ship was driven ashore and wrecked at Seaham, County Durham. |
| Lady Mary | United Kingdom | The brig struck a sunken rock and was subsequently destroyed by fire in Branshaw Bay. |
| Mary and Jane | United Kingdom | The ship was wrecked on the coast of Sicily. Her crew were rescued. |

== 5 February ==
List of shipwrecks: February 1848
| Ship | State | Description |
|---|---|---|
| Ann | United Kingdom | The ship was driven ashore on the west coast of Lundy Island, Devon with the loss of all hands. She was on a voyage from St. Ives, Cornwall to Cardiff, Glamorgan. |
| Britannia | United Kingdom | The mistico was damaged on the Punta Mala Rocks, off the coast of Spain. She was on a voyage from Málaga to Gibraltar. She was refloated on 23 February with assistance from HMS Polyphemus (Royal Navy) and towed in to Gibraltar in a waterlogged condition. |
| Fäderneslandet | (Russian Empire) Grand Duchy of Finland | The full rigged ship from Björneborg was wrecked near Namsen, Norway. Five of her crew were lost. |
| Lord Fitzgerald | United Kingdom | The ship ran aground on the Goodwin Sands, Kent. She was on a voyage from Kilrush, County Clare to London. She was refloated. |
| Rob Roy | United Kingdom | The paddle tug caught fire at South Shields, County Durham and was scuttled. |
| Secret | United Kingdom | The ship ran aground on the Goodwin Sands. She was on a voyage from Patras, Greece to London. she was refloated. |
| Tom Moore | United Kingdom | The barque was wrecked on the Riding Rocks. Her crew were rescued. She was on a voyage from Matanzas, Cuba to Hamburg. |
| Unity | United Kingdom | The ship was driven ashore at Stromness, Orkney Islands. . She was refloated on 8 February and resumed her voyage to Dublin. |
| Vixen | United Kingdom | The ship was driven ashore at Bolt Head, Devon and was abandoned by her crew. She was on a voyage from Catania, Sicily to London. |

== 6 February ==
List of shipwrecks: 6 February 1848
| Ship | State | Description |
|---|---|---|
| Agnes | United Kingdom | The ship ran aground and was damaged on the Goodwin Sands, Kent. She was on a voyage from Rouen, Seine-Inférieure, France to Ipswich, Suffolk. She was refloated and put in to Harwich, Essex in a leaky condition. |
| Breadalbane | United Kingdom | The ship was driven ashore and wrecked at Aldeburgh, Suffolk. Her crew were rescued. |
| Caroline Frances | United Kingdom | The ship was driven ashore at Hendon, County Durham. |
| Gipsy | United Kingdom | The sloop was in collision with Lively or Quiz (United Kingdom) and capsized in the River Mersey. Her crew were rescued. |
| John and Robert | United Kingdom | The ship was driven ashore and wrecked on Little Cayman, Cayman Islands. Her crew were rescued. She was on a voyage from Liverpool, Lancashire to Mobile, Alabama, United States. |
| Phoenix | United Kingdom | The brig was wrecked at Cobh, County Cork with the loss of all hands. She was on a voyage from the Greenock, Renfrewshire to Bahia, Brazil or vice versa. |
| Radiant | United Kingdom | The ship sank off Barry Island, Glamorgan. Her crew were rescued. She was on a voyage from Newport, Monmouthshire to Dundee, Forfarshire. |

== 7 February ==
List of shipwrecks: 7 February 1848
| Ship | State | Description |
|---|---|---|
| Hannibal | United Kingdom | The whaler was driven ashore and wrecked on the coast of Norway. the one crew member on board survived, the rest having been washed overboard and lost on 1 February. She was on a voyage from Quebec City, Province of Canada to Peterhead, Aberdeenshire. |
| Tiger | United Kingdom | The ship departed from Trieste for Cork or Falmouth, Cornwall. No further trace, presumed foundered with the loss of all hands. |

== 8 February ==
List of shipwrecks: 8 February 1848
| Ship | State | Description |
|---|---|---|
| Aurelius | France | The ship was wrecked on Grand Bahama. She was on a voyage from New Orleans, Louisiana, United States to Havre de Grâce, Seine-Inférieure. |
| Diamond | United Kingdom | The ship was in collision with Amity (United Kingdom) and sank . Her crew were rescued by Amity. Diamond was on a voyage from Newcastle upon Tyne, Northumberland to London. |
| Janets | United Kingdom | The ship ran aground on the Sizewell Bank, in the North Sea off the coast of Suffolk. She was on a voyage from South Shields, County Durham to Saint-Valery-sur-Somme, Somme, France. She was refloated and taken in to Lowestoft, Suffolk in a leaky condition. |
| Mertoun | United Kingdom | The ship ran aground on the Florida Reef. She was on a voyage from New Orleans, Louisiana, United States to Liverpool. She was refloated on 11 February and taken in to Key West, Florida, United States in a leaky condition. |
| Prince Albert | United Kingdom | The ship sprang a leak. She was run ashore at Birsay, Orkney Islands, where she was wrecked. She was on a voyage from Danzig to Inverness. |
| Sir Francis Bond Head | United Kingdom | The ship was abandoned in the Mediterranean Sea off the coast of Malta. Her crew were rescued by the brig Pompilio ( Grand Duchy of Tuscany ). Sir Francis Bond Head was on a voyage from Agrigento, Sicily to Malta. |

== 9 February ==
List of shipwrecks: 9 February 1848
| Ship | State | Description |
|---|---|---|
| Christiania | United Kingdom | The ship ran aground on the Varne Bank, in the Strait of Dover. She was on a voyage from South Shields, County Durham to Oran, Algeria. She was refloated and put in to Ramsgate, Kent in a leaky condition. |
| Constant | United Kingdom | The ship ran aground on the Goodwin Sands, Kent. She was on a voyage from South Shields, County Durham to Cette, Hérault, France. She was refloated and taken in to Ramsgate in a leaky condition. |
| Ellen Gwenllyan | United Kingdom | The ship was driven ashore and severely damaged at Pembrey, Carmarthenshire. |
| John and Mary | United Kingdom | The sloop was driven ashore at Aberystwyth, Cardiganshire. She had become a wreck by 23 February. |
| Lady Combermere | United Kingdom | The ship departed from Cádiz, Spain for Leith, Lothian. Presumed subsequently foundered off Guernsey, Channel Islands with the loss of all hands; a pipe of wine that formed part of her cargo was picked up off Guernsey. |
| Montcalm | United Kingdom | The ship was wrecked on the Outer Shoal, in the North Sea off Aldeburgh, Suffolk. |
| Robert and Mary | United Kingdom | The ship was driven ashore at Équihen, Pas-de-Calais, France. She was on a voyage from Plymouth, Devon to Dover, Kent. She had become a wreck by 12 February. |
| Susan | United Kingdom | The brig struck the wreck of Glenarm Castle (United Kingdom), on the Haisborough Sands, in the North Sea off the coast of Norfolk. She floated off and sank. Her crew were rescued by a yawl. She was on a voyage from Rouen, Seine-Inférieure, France to Blyth, Northumberland, or from Newcastle upon Tyne, Northumberland to Plymouth, Devon. |
| Stagshaw | United Kingdom | The ship ran aground on the Goodwin Sands. She was on a voyage from Sunderland, County Durham to Constantinople, Ottoman Empire. She was refloated and taken in to Ramsgate in a leaky condition. |
| Trader | United Kingdom | The ship was driven ashore and wrecked in Cardigan Bay. She was on a voyage from Hook, Hampshire to "Camdroon". |
| Trois Amis | (flag) France | The ship was wrecked on the Hooper Sands, in the Bristol Channel. |

== 10 February ==
List of shipwrecks: 10 February 1848
| Ship | State | Description |
|---|---|---|
| Brothers | United Kingdom | The ship was wrecked at Irvine, Ayrshire. |
| Emma Henrietta | Hamburg | The ship was abandoned in the North Sea 10 nautical miles (19 km) off the Farne Islands, Northumberland, United Kingdom. Her crew were rescued by John and Thomas (United Kingdom). Emma Henrietta was on a voyage from Aberdour, Fife, United Kingdom to Glückstadt, Duchy of Schleswig. |
| Endeavour | United Kingdom | The sloop was driven ashore in the Belfast Lough. She was refloated on 15 February and towed in to Belfast, County Antrim. |
| General Rebow | United Kingdom | The ship was departed from London for São Miguel Island, Azores. No further trace, presumed foundered with the loss of all hands. |

== 11 February ==
List of shipwrecks: February 1848
| Ship | State | Description |
|---|---|---|
| Isabella | United Kingdom | The ship ran aground in the River Thames at Coalhouse Fort, Essex. She was on a voyage from Newcastle upon Tyne, Northumberland to London. |
| May-flower | United Kingdom | The ship was driven ashore at Almería, Spain. Her crew were rescued. She was consequently condemned. |
| Mountaineer | United Kingdom | The ship capsized in the Atlantic Ocean with the loss of her captain. Survivors were rescued by Victoria (United Kingdom). Mountaineer was on a voyage from Halifax, Nova Scotia, British North America to Trinidad. |
| Omega | United Kingdom | The full-rigged ship was abandoned in the Atlantic Ocean. On 11 February, 130 passengers and twelve crew were taken off by the brig Barbara ( (United Kingdom of Great Britain and Ireland) British North America). The barque Aurora (United Kingdom) took off 140 passengers, 70 of whom died before they could be landed at Halifax, Nova Scotia, British North America. The remaining 24 passengers and 22 crew were rescued on 12 February by Highland Mary (United Kingdom). Omega was on a voyage from Liverpool to New York, United States. |
| Sesostris | United Kingdom | The ship ran aground on the Codlins Bank, in the Irish Sea. She was on a voyage from Greenock, Renfrewshire to Bombay, India. She was refloated and put back to Greenock for repairs, arriving on 15 February. |
| Sir Francis Bonham | United Kingdom | The ship foundered in the Mediterranean Sea 40 nautical miles (74 km) west of Gozo, Malta. Her crew were rescued. |

== 12 February ==
List of shipwrecks: 12 February 1848
| Ship | State | Description |
|---|---|---|
| Atalanta | United Kingdom | The ship capsized and sank at Berwick upon Tweed, Northumberland when Hannahs (United Kingdom) listed against her. |
| Friends | United Kingdom | The ship was driven ashore on Walney Island, Lancashire. She was on a voyage from Wicklow to Lancaster, Lancashire. |
| larch | United Kingdom | The ship ran aground on the Hinder Sand, in the North Sea off the Dutch coast. She was on a voyage from Hartlepool, County Durham to Bermuda. She was refloated and made for London in a leaky condition. |
| Sylphiden | Norway | The barque was driven ashore and wrecked on Lundy Island, Devon, United Kingdom. She was on a voyage from Newport, Monmouthshire, United Kingdom to the West Indies. |

== 13 February ==
List of shipwrecks: 13 February 1848
| Ship | State | Description |
|---|---|---|
| Castlereagh | (United Kingdom of Great Britain and Ireland) New South Wales | The schooner was wrecked on "Lefoo Island". Her crew were rescued. |
| Dexterous | United Kingdom | The ship struck rocks off Ouessant, Finistère, France and was damaged. She was on a voyage from Messina, Sicily to Antwerp, Belgium. She was assisted into Brest, Finistère for repairs. |
| Eden | United Kingdom | The ship ran aground on the Haisborough Sands, in the North Sea off the coast of Norfolk. She was on a voyage from North Shields, County Durham to London. She was refloated and resumed her voyage in a leaky condition. |
| Habnab | (United Kingdom of Great Britain and Ireland) Jersey | The ship sprang a leak and put in to Cherbourg, Seine-Inférieure, France, where she ran aground. She was on a voyage from Hartlepool, County Durham to Jersey. |
| Hanna | Denmark | The ship was driven ashore on Skagen. Her crew were rescued. She was on a voyage from Messina, Sicily to Copenhagen. |
| Isabella | United Kingdom | The ship was driven onto the Southerness Rocks, Dumfriesshire. she was on a voyage from Dublin to Dumfries. |
| Jane | United Kingdom | The ship sank at Anstruther, Fife. She was on a voyage from Perth to Bonnybridge, Stirlingshire. |
| Lord Ravensworth | United Kingdom | The ship ran aground on the Culver Sand, in the English Channel. She was on a voyage from Newcastle upon Tyne, Northumberland to Constantinople, Ottoman Empire. She was refloated and taken in to Portsmouth, Hampshire in a leaky condition. |
| Maria | Portugal | The ship departed from the Mumbles, Glamorgan, United Kingdom for Lisbon. No further trace, presumed foundered with the loss of all hands. |
| Sarah | (United Kingdom of Great Britain and Ireland) New South Wales | The brig was wrecked on "Lefoo Island" (Lifou Island) Her crew were rescued. |
| Tricolor | Norway | The brig wrecked close to Hållö lighthouse, near Sälö, Sweden. |

== 14 February ==
List of shipwrecks: 14 February 1848
| Ship | State | Description |
|---|---|---|
| Alfred | United Kingdom | The ship ran aground on the Kentish Knock. She was on a voyage from Sunderland, County Durham to Littlehampton, Sussex. She was refloated and put in to Harwich, Essex in a leaky condition. |
| Carron | United Kingdom | The brig was driven ashore and wrecked on Rattray Head, Aberdeenshire. Her crew were rescued by the schooner Harbinger (United Kingdom). Carron was on a voyage from Liverpool, Lancashire to South Shields, County Durham. |
| Harriet | United Kingdom | The ship was driven ashore and wrecked north of Scarborough, Yorkshire. |
| Indian | United Kingdom | The ship ran aground on the Gunfleet Sand, in the North Sea off the coast of Essex. She was refloated on 16 February with the assistance of six smacks and assisted in to Wivenhoe, Essex in a leaky condition. |

== 15 February ==
List of shipwrecks: 15 February 1848
| Ship | State | Description |
|---|---|---|
| Mary Redgrave | United Kingdom | The ship ran aground on the Haisborough Sands, in the North Sea off the coast of Norfolk. She was on a voyage from South Shields, County Durham to Constantinople, Ottoman Empire. She was refloated and put in to Hull, Yorkshire in a leaky condition. |
| Susannah | United Kingdom | The ship was wrecked off Saint-Jean-d'Acre, Ottoman Empire. Her crew were rescued. |
| Thomas Dempsey | United Kingdom | The ship ran aground at Kingstown, County Dublin. She was on a voyage from Dublin to Trinidad. She was refloated and put back to Dublin. |

== 16 February ==
List of shipwrecks: 16 February 1848
| Ship | State | Description |
|---|---|---|
| Helen | United Kingdom | The ship departed from Torbay for São Miguel Island, Azores. No further trace, presumed foundered with the loss of all hands. |
| Maltass | United Kingdom | The ship was wrecked 17 nautical miles (31 km) from Messina, Sicily. Her crew were rescued. She was on a voyage from Civitavecchia, Papal States to Constantinople, Ottoman Empire. |
| Mercury | United Kingdom | The ship ran aground on the Gunfleet Sand, in the North Sea off the coast of Essex. She was on a voyage from Sunderland, County Durham to London. She was refloated with assistance and resumed her voyage. |
| Midas | United Kingdom | The ship was wrecked on Taylor's Bank, in Liverpool Bay. Her crew were rescued. She was on a voyage from Ardrossan, Ayrshire to Liverpool, Lancashire. |
| Trois Amis | France | The schooner ran aground and was wrecked at Port Talbot, Glamorgan, United Kingdom. She was on a voyage from a French port to Port Talbot. |

== 17 February ==
List of shipwrecks: 17 February 1848
| Ship | State | Description |
|---|---|---|
| Ann and Sarah | United Kingdom | The ship was driven ashore and wrecked 1 nautical mile (1.9 km) east of Porthcawl, Glamorgan. She was on a voyage from Port Talbot, Glamorgan to Bristol, Gloucestershire. |
| Josephine | United Kingdom | The sloop was driven ashore near Montrose, Forfarshire. She was on a voyage from Sunderland, County Durham to Montrose. |
| Nautilus | United Kingdom | The ship departed from Falmouth, Cornwall for Terceira Island, Azores. No further trace, presumed foundered with the loss of all hands. |
| Onderneming | Elbing | The ship was abandoned in the North Sea. Her crew were rescued. She was on a voyage from Elbing to Aberdeen, United Kingdom. |

== 18 February ==
List of shipwrecks: 18 February 1848
| Ship | State | Description |
|---|---|---|
| Admiral | United Kingdom | The ship departed from New York for Belfast, County Antrim. No further trace, presumed foundered with the loss of all hands. |
| Baldoon | United Kingdom | The ship ran aground on the Blackshaw Bank. She was on a voyage from Maryport, Cumberland to Dumfries. |
| Isabella | United Kingdom | The schooner was driven ashore in Cymyran Bay. She was on a voyage from Cardiff to Liverpool, Lancashire. She was refloated the next day and towed in to Holyhead, Anglesey. |
| Jessie | United Kingdom | The ship was driven ashore in Blacksod Bay. She was on a voyage from Limerick to Troon, Ayrshire. She was refloated on 21 February and resumed her voyage. |
| Reliance | United Kingdom | The smack ran aground on the Whitby Rock. She was refloated and taken in to Whitby, Yorkshire. |
| Salacia | United Kingdom | The ship ran aground in the River Stour. She was on a voyage from Mistley Quay to Liverpool. She was refloated and put back to Mistley Quay. |

== 19 February ==
List of shipwrecks: 19 February 1848
| Ship | State | Description |
|---|---|---|
| Diligence | United Kingdom | The schooner was beached near Bamburgh Castle, Northumberland. Her crew survived. She was on a voyage from Newcastle upon Tyne, Northumberland to Fisherrow, Lothian. |
| Lady East | United Kingdom | The ship departed from Singapore for Liverpool, Lancashire. No further trace, presumed foundered with the loss of all hands. |
| Speedwell | United Kingdom | The ship ran aground on the Shipwash Sand, in the North Sea off the coast of Essex. She was on a voyage from South Shields, County Durham to Dublin. She was refloated and taken in to Harwich, Essex in a leaky condition. |

== 20 February ==
List of shipwrecks: 20 February 1848
| Ship | State | Description |
|---|---|---|
| Amethyst | United Kingdom | The ship was driven ashore and damaged in Pucother Bay, Cornwall. Her crew were rescued. She was on a voyage from Nantes, Loire-Inférieure to Cardiff, Glamorgan. She was refloated on 8 March and taken in to Padstow, Cornwall. |
| Anthracite | United Kingdom | The ship ran aground at the mouth of the "Egeeste". She was refloated. |
| Aphrasia | (United Kingdom of Great Britain and Ireland) South Australia | The steamship was damaged by fire at Geelong. |
| Avenger | United Kingdom | The ship was wrecked on the Sorelle Rocks, in the Mediterranean Sea off the Barbary Coast. She was on a voyage from Gibraltar to Malta. |
| Georgina | United Kingdom | The ship was driven ashore in Gibraltar Bay. She was on a voyage from Smyrna, Ottoman Empire to a British port. She was refloated. |
| Navarino | Netherlands | The ship was driven ashore near "Zinderhaaks". She was on a voyage from Lombok, Netherlands East Indies to Amsterdam, North Holland. She was refloated and towed in to the Nieuw Diep. |
| Richmond | United States | The ship was wrecked on the Île d'Oléron, Charente-Maritime, France with the loss of all but three of her crew. She was on a voyage from New Orleans, Louisiana to Bordeaux, Gironde. |
| Utile | France | The ship was driven ashore in the Loire near Saint-Nazaire, Loire-Inférieure. She was on a voyage from Lima, Peru to Nantes, Loire-Inférieure. She sank on 29 February. |

== 21 February ==
List of shipwrecks: 21 February 1848
| Ship | State | Description |
|---|---|---|
| Hudscot | United Kingdom | The ship was driven ashore at Bideford, Devon. She was refloated and taken in to Bideford. |
| Manche | France | The steamship was in collision with Jeune Hirondelle and sank. She was on a voyage from Bordeaux, Gironde to Dunkirk, Nord. |
| Margaret | United Kingdom | The ship was driven ashore and sank at "Cape Bourlos", Egypt. She was on a voyage from Troon, Ayrshire to Alexandria, Egypt. |
| Mary Bentley | United Kingdom | The brig ran aground on the Goodwin Sands, Kent. She was on a voyage from South Shields, County Durham to Marseille, Bouches-du-Rhône, France. She was refloated but consequently sank. Her seven crew were rescued. |
| William Kelson | United Kingdom | The ship was wrecked in Trinity Bay with the loss of all but two of her crew. She was on a voyage from Cádiz, Spain to Trinity, Newfoundland, British North America. |

== 22 February ==
List of shipwrecks: 22 February 1848
| Ship | State | Description |
|---|---|---|
| Dana | United States | The ship was abandoned in the Atlantic Ocean with the loss of a crew member. Survivors were rescued by Monterey (United Kingdom). Dana was on a voyage from London, United Kingdom to Boston, Massachusetts. |
| Stata | United Kingdom | The ship was driven ashore near Sestos, Ottoman Empire. She was on a voyage from Hartlepool, County Durham to Constantinople, Ottoman Empire. She was refloated on 28 February and resumed her voyage. |
| Susan | United Kingdom | The schooner struck a sunken rock and foundered in the North Sea off the coast of Suffolk. Her crew were rescued. She was on a voyage from Newcastle upon Tyne, Northumberland to Plymouth, Devon. |
| Tynwald | United Kingdom | The paddle steamer was in collision with the brig William (United Kingdom). |

== 23 February ==
List of shipwrecks: 23 February 1848
| Ship | State | Description |
|---|---|---|
| Agnes | United Kingdom | The ship capsized in the Atlantic Ocean. Her 29 crew were rescued on 27 February by Lady of the Lake (United Kingdom. Agnes was on a voyage from Callao, Peru to London. |
| Fanny | (United Kingdom of Great Britain and Ireland) Jersey | The ship was lost at the mouth of the Seine. Her crew were rescued. She was on a voyage from the Clyde to Rouen, Seine-Inférieure, France. |
| William | United Kingdom | The sloop capsized in the North Sea 12 nautical miles (22 km) east north east of Flamborough Head, Yorkshire with the loss of her captain. The other crew member was rescued by Leda (United Kingdom). |

== 24 February ==
List of shipwrecks: 24 February 1848
| Ship | State | Description |
|---|---|---|
| Agnes | United Kingdom | The ship was wrecked on Corvo Island, Azores with the loss of three of her crew. She was on a voyage from Montevideo, Uruguay to Liverpool, Lancashire. |
| Post Boy | United Kingdom | The schooner capsized in the Atlantic Ocean with the loss of a crew member. Survivors were rescued on 29 February by Decima (Netherlands). Post Boy was towed in to Jersey, Channel Islands in a derelict condition on 10 March. |
| Trade | United Kingdom | The brig ran aground and sank on the Scroby Sands, Norfolk. She was on a voyage from Hartlepool, County Durham to London. She became a wreck the next day. |

== 25 February ==
List of shipwrecks: 25 February 1848
| Ship | State | Description |
|---|---|---|
| Auguste | France | The ship was driven ashore and wrecked east of Cherbourg, Seine-Inférieure. She was on a voyage from Newcastle upon Tyne, Northumberland, United Kingdom to "Bonne". |
| Felix | France | The ship was driven ashore and damaged near La Rochelle, Charente-Maritime. She was on a voyage from Havana, Cuba to La Rochelle. She was refloated. |
| Friedrich | Prussia | The ship was driven ashore on Saltholm, Denmark. She was on a voyage Pillau to Aberdeen, United Kingdom. |
| Rose | United Kingdom | The barque was driven ashore and sank near Brodick, Isle of Arran, Inner Hebrides. Her crew were rescued. The wreck was taken in to Ardrossan, Ayrshire for repairs on 11 March. |
| Waratah | United Kingdom | The ship was struck by a wave in the Atlantic Ocean with the loss of thirteen of her crew. Two passengers were taken off the wreck by Preciosa (United Kingdom), leaving twelve people. Waratah subsequently came ashore on Molène, Finistère, France with the loss of three crew. She was subsequently towed in to port in a severely damaged condition. She was on a voyage from London to Sydney, New South Wales. |

== 26 February ==
List of shipwrecks: 26 February 1848
| Ship | State | Description |
|---|---|---|
| Ann | United Kingdom | The schooner was driven ashore at Douglas, Isle of Man. She was on a voyage from Newry, County Antrim to Runcorn, Cheshire. She was refloated on 9 March and taken in to Douglas. |
| Barossa | United Kingdom | The ship was severely damaged by fire in Belfast Lough. |
| Calypso | United Kingdom | The full-rigged ship ran aground on the Arklow Bank, in the Irish Sea off the coast of County Wicklow. |
| Delight | United Kingdom | The brigantine ran aground on St Mary's Isle, Isle of Man and was damaged. She subsequently drove ashore and was wrecked at Douglas. Her crew survived but a pilot was drowned attempting to rescue them. She was on a voyage from Maryport, Cumberland to Dublin. |
| Farewell | Prussia | The ship foundered in the Atlantic Ocean with the loss of all but three of her crew. She was on a voyage from South Shields, County Durham, United Kingdom to Barcelona, Spain. |
| Honfleur | France | The steamship struck the pier and sank at Calais with the loss of five lives. She was refloated on 4 March and taken in to Calais. |
| Maitland | (United Kingdom of Great Britain and Ireland) New South Wales | The ship was driven ashore at Geelong, Victoria. She was refloated on 2 March. |
| Margaret Wilkie | United Kingdom | The ship foundered in the Adriatic Sea north of Fano, Papal States. Her crew were rescued. She was on a voyage from Trieste to Cork or Falmouth, Cornwall. |
| Mills | United Kingdom | The flat was driven ashore at Douglas. She had been refloated by 15 March. |
| Mirabeau | France | The ship was wrecked whilst on a voyage from the Loire to Guadeloupe. |
| Ospray | United Kingdom | The ship was driven ashore at Point of Ayre, Isle of Man. |
| Richard | Netherlands | The ship was abandoned in the Atlantic Ocean. She was on a voyage from Lisbon, Portugal to Pillau, Prussia. She was subsequently taken in to Saint-Brieuc, Côtes-du-Nord, France in a derelict condition. |
| Stagg | (United Kingdom of Great Britain and Ireland) Isle of Man | The ship was driven ashore and wrecked at Castletown. Her crew were rescued. |
| Tamerlane | United Kingdom | The ship was abandoned in the English Channel with the loss of four of her crew. She was on a voyage from South Shields, County Durham to Cartagena, Spain. |

== 27 February ==
List of shipwrecks: 27 February 1848
| Ship | State | Description |
|---|---|---|
| Calypso | United Kingdom | The barque was driven ashore and wrecked at Mizen Head, County Cork. Her crew were rescued. She was on a voyage from Liverpool, Lancashire to Rio de Janeiro, Brazil. |
| Catherine | United Kingdom | The ship was driven ashore at Kilrush, County Clare. |
| Dalhousie | United Kingdom | The ship was driven ashore on Holy Isle, in the Firth of Clyde. She was on a voyage from Liverpool to Troon, Ayrshire. She was refloated and completed her voyage. |
| Elk | (United Kingdom of Great Britain and Ireland) Isle of Man | The ship was abandoned in the Irish Sea off the Calf of Man and subsequently foundered. She was on a voyage from Peel, Isle of Man to Chester, Cheshire. |
| Governor Douglas | United Kingdom | The ship was driven ashore at Kingstown, County Dublin. She was on a voyage from Dublin to Cork. She was refloated and taken in to Kingstown. |
| Lady Leith | United Kingdom | The ship was wrecked at Cape Recife, in Algoa Bay. Her crew were rescued. |
| Laure | France | The brig foundered in the Atlantic Ocean. |
| Levantine | United Kingdom | The steamship was driven ashore at Wexford. Her crew were rescued. She was on a voyage from Liverpool to Malta and Constantinople, Ottoman Empire. She was refloated on 5 April and towed in to Wexford. |
| Libra | United Kingdom | The ship foundered in the Atlantic Ocean with the loss of all eight crew. |
| Lively | United Kingdom | The brig was driven ashore at Moyne, County Tipperary. |
| Mary and Jessie | United Kingdom | The ship was driven ashore at "Manksman's Lake", Kirkcudbrightshire. She was on a voyage from Dumfries to Kirkcudbright. |

== 28 February ==
List of shipwrecks: 28 February 1848
| Ship | State | Description |
|---|---|---|
| Andes | United Kingdom | The ship was driven ashore at "Llannddyn", Caernarfonshire. She was on a voyage from Liverpool, Lancashire to Aberavon, Glamorgan. She was refloated on 4 March and taken in to Caernarfon in a severely damaged condition. |
| Catherine | United Kingdom | The ship was abandoned in the Atlantic Ocean. Her crew were rescued by Eblana (United Kingdom). Catherine was on a voyage from Ibrail, Ottoman Empire to Cork. |
| Industry | United Kingdom | The smack was run down and sunk in the Humber by the steam tug Rendell (United Kingdom). |
| Lively | United Kingdom | The schooner was driven ashore at "Merin". She was on a voyage from Galway to Troon, Ayrshire. |
| Marine Plant | United Kingdom | The ship sank at Galway. She was on a voyage from Newcastle upon Tyne, Northumberland to Galway. She was refloated on 5 March; found to be hogged and severely damaged. |
| Mariner | United Kingdom | The schooner ran aground and was severely damaged on the Bottle Nose Rock, north of Berwick upon Tweed, Northumberland. She was on a voyage from Perth to London. She was refloated. |
| Martha | United Kingdom | The ship ran aground on the North Bull, in the Irish Sea. She was on a voyage from Preston, Lancashire to Dundalk, County Louth. She was refloated and beached at Dundalk. |
| Mary | United Kingdom | The ship ran aground off Molène, Finistère, France and was damaged. She was on a voyage from Newport, Monmouthshire to Barcelona, Spain. She was refloated and assisted in to Brest, Finistère. |
| Myriam | United Kingdom | The schooner was driven ashore at Pwllheli, Caernarfonshire. |
| Premier | United Kingdom | The ship ran aground at Westport, County Mayo. |

== 29 February ==
List of shipwrecks: 29 February 1848
| Ship | State | Description |
|---|---|---|
| Bideford | United Kingdom | The ship ran aground and sank off Bideford, Devon. She was on a voyage from Lisbon, Portugal to Hamburg. Bideford was refloated on 4 March and taken into Bideford in a severely damaged condition. |
| Cambrian Maid | United Kingdom | The ship was wrecked at Pwllheli, Caernarfonshire. Her crew were rescued. |
| Centurion | Hamburg | The ship struck a sunken rock off Jersey, Channel Islands and was beached. She was on a voyage from Rio de Janeiro, Brazil to Hamburg. |
| Eagle | United Kingdom | The ship ran aground at Gibraltar. She was on a voyage from Ibraila, Ottoman Empire to Cork. She was refloated. |
| Exchange | United Kingdom | The ship was wrecked on the Maplin Sand. Her crew were rescued. She was refloated on 3 March with the assistance of five smacks and taken in to Whitstable, Kent. |
| Magnet | United Kingdom | The ship ran aground on the Barber Sand, in the North Sea off the coast of Suffolk. |
| Mary Ann | United Kingdom | The ship struck a sunken rock off Tananger, Norway and was lost. Her crew were rescued. She was on a voyage from Great Yarmouth, Norfolk to Stavanger, Norway. |
| Salus | United Kingdom | The brig was driven ashore on Hoog, Duchy of Holstein. She was on a voyage from Hull, Yorkshire to Hamburg. She was refloated on 3 March and taken in to Amrum, Duchy of Holstein. |

== Unknown date ==
List of shipwrecks: Unknown date in February 1848
| Ship | State | Description |
|---|---|---|
| Alcide | Belgium | The ship was lost near La Rochelle, Charente-Maritime before 12 February. |
| Amity | United Kingdom | The barque was abandoned in the Atlantic Ocean off the Azores before 9 February. |
| Anna Catharina | France | The ship was lost between Hammerfest and Tromsø, Norway with the loss of all but three of her crew. She was on a voyage from Riga, Russia to Antwerp, Belgium. |
| Bonne Marie | France | The ship was wrecked on the Scylla Rocks, in the Strait of Messina with the loss of two of her crew. She was on a voyage from Alexandria, Egypt to Marseille, Bouches-du-Rhône. |
| Celerity | United Kingdom | The ship ran aground on the Brake Sand, in the North Sea off the coast of Kent. She was on a voyage from South Shields, County Durham to Dartmouth, Devon. She was refloated and put in to Ramsgate, Kent, where she arrived on 5 February. |
| Christian August | Sweden | The brig was damaged by ice and sank at Galaţi, Ottoman Empire. |
| Clyde | United Kingdom | The ship ran aground on the Haisborough Sands, in the North Sea off the coast of Norfolk before 19 February. She was on a voyage from Hull to New Orleans, Louisiana, United States. She was refloated and resumed her voyage. |
| Elizabeth | (United Kingdom of Great Britain and Ireland) New South Wales | The ship was wrecked on Erromango in mid-February. |
| Fatty Rahman | India | The ship foundered off Sadras with the loss of all but one of her crew. She was on a voyage from Bombay to Madras. |
| Felicia | United Kingdom | The chasse-marée was lost at Port-Louis, Morbihan. She was on a voyage from London, United Kingdom to L'Orient, Morbihan. |
| George | United Kingdom | The ship was driven ashore at Hoylake, Lancashire. She was refloated and taken in to Liverpool, Lancashire, where she arrived on 18 February. |
| Henriette | United Kingdom | The ship ran aground on the Gunfleet Sand, in the North Sea off the coast of Essex. She was on a voyage from Aberdeen to Woolwich, Kent. She was refloated on 5 February and taken in to Harwich, Essex in a leaky condition. |
| Hortense | United Kingdom | The ship was lost at the mouth of the Aude before 5 February. |
| Isabella | United Kingdom | The ship ran aground in Carnarvon Bay. She was on a voyage from Cardiff, Glamorgan to Liverpool. She was refloated and taken in to Holyhead, Anglesey in a leaky condition, arriving on 19 February. |
| Jeune Amanel | France | The ship was lost near Agde, Hérault before 4 February. |
| John Elliotson | United Kingdom | The ship ran aground on the Black Tail Sand, off the north Kent coast. She was refloated on 5 February and taken in to Whitstable, Kent. |
| Marion | United Kingdom | The ship ran aground "on the Longships". She was refloated and assisted in to Dover, Kent by two smacks. |
| Marshall | Hamburg | The steamship ran aground on the Vogelsand, in the North Sea. She was on a voyage from Glückstadt, Duchy of Holstein to Hull. She was refloated. |
| Mayfield | United Kingdom | The ship caught fire and sank off Severndroog, India. Her crew survived. She was on a voyage from London to Bombay. |
| Moris | United Kingdom | The schooner was driven ashore in Loch Indaal. Her crew were rescued. |
| North Star | United Kingdom | The ship ran aground in the Yangtze downstream of Woosung, China. She was refloated ten days later and taken in to Shanghai. |
| Oratava | United Kingdom | The schooner was wrecked on the Ontong Java Atoll before 26 February. Her crew were rescued. |
| Perseverance | United Kingdom | The ship sprang a leak and sank in the English Channel 16 nautical miles (30 km) west north west of South Foreland, Kent. Her crew were rescued by Providentia (United Kingdom). Perseverance was on a voyage from Portland, Dorset to London. |
| Robert | (United Kingdom of Great Britain and Ireland) British North America | The ship was abandoned in the Atlantic Ocean before 19 February. |
| Victoria | United Kingdom | The ship departed from Stromness, Orkney Islands for the Gulf of Lyon. No further trace, presumed foundered with the loss of all hands. |
| Zante | United Kingdom | The ship was wrecked at "Tobasco" before 15 February. |
