= St Davids and the Cathedral Close =

Community in Pembrokeshire, Wales

Coordinates: 51.882°N 5.269°W

- City and Community
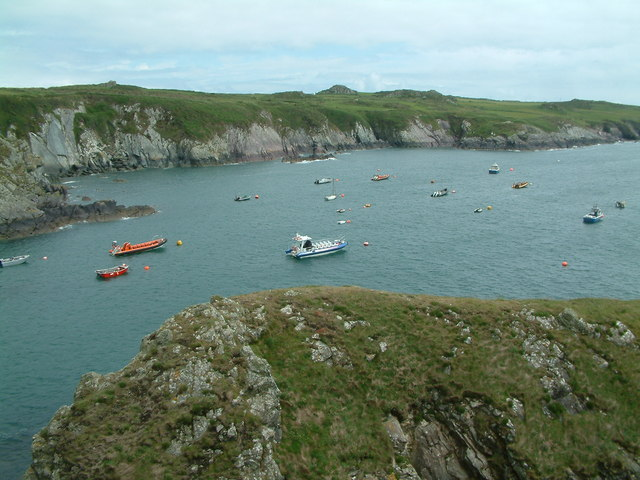
- Typical community coastline at Porthstinian

- Location within Pembrokeshire
- Interactive map of St Davids and the Cathedral Close
- Area: 17.93 sq mi (46.4 km^{2})
- Population: 1,751 (2021)
  - Density: 98/sq mi (38/km^{2})
- OS grid reference: SM7425
  - Cardiff: 90 mi (140 km) ESE
  - London: 220 mi (350 km) ESE
- Principal area: Pembrokeshire
- Preserved county: Dyfed
- Country: Wales
- Sovereign state: United Kingdom
- Places: St Davids, St Justinians, Caerfarchell, St Davids Head, Whitesands Bay, Ramsey Island
- Post town: HAVERFORDWEST
- Postcode district: SA62
- Dialling code: 01437
- Police: Dyfed-Powys
- Fire: Mid and West Wales
- Ambulance: Welsh
- UK Parliament: Preseli Pembrokeshire
- Senedd Cymru – Welsh Parliament: Ceredigion Penfro
- Website: www.stdavids.gov.uk

St Davids and the Cathedral Close (Welsh: Tyddewi a Chlos y Gadeirlan) is a community in western Pembrokeshire, Wales. It comprises the city of St Davids and its surrounding rural area. It was established in 1987.

== Geography ==
The community occupies the northwestern tip of Pembrokeshire (including the westernmost point of Wales), in the Pembrokeshire Coast National Park, and includes a number of small settlements as well as the city of St Davids. The A487 road runs through it, as do a number of minor roads. Much of the community is elevated agricultural land and rocky coastline. Ramsey Island is part of the community.

At the 2001 census, the population of the community was 1,797. In 2011, this had risen to 1,841, and fell to 1,751 at the 2021 census.

There are several isolated hamlets in the community:

- Berea
- Caerfarchell
- Carnhedryn
- Fachelich/Vachelich
- Llandruidion
- Rhodiad-y-brenin
- Treleddyd-fawr
- Trelerw
- Tretio

Several islands and islets lie within a few miles from the coast. These are administratively within St Davids:

- Ramsey Island, also known as Ynys Dewi, is the largest.
- Carreg Yr Esgob
- Carreg Fran
- Ynys Eilun
- Ynys Bery

The islands below are part of the Bishop And Clerks grouping, and were included in 1987:

- Carreg Rhoson
- Carreg Rhoson East Island
- Carreg-trai
- Cribog
- Daufraich
- Llechau-isaf
- Llechau-uchaf
- Maen Daufraich
- Maen Rhoson
- Moelyn
- North Bishop
- South Bishop also known as Em-sger, is the furthest away from Pen Dal-aderyn at four miles (six kilometres).

== Governance ==
The community was established in 1974 as the community of St Davids; under The Preseli (Communities) Order 1987 it was given its present name.

St Davids City Council is the community council body, and has twelve councillors. The Council employs a City Clerk and a Financial Officer. The council is responsible for a wide range of public services and facilities, including providing links to Pembrokeshire County Council and Pembrokeshire Coast National Park Authority.

Following a public consultation, in March 2004 the community, in conjunction with the Pembrokeshire Local Action Network for Enterprise and Development (PLANED), published an action plan, covering:

- Community and Youth
- Heritage and Culture
- Sport, Leisure and Recreation
- Environment and Enhancement
- Tourism, Economy and Employment
- Housing
- Transport and Highways

The aim was "to encourage both local residents, potential partners and funders to realise the benefits that the proposals can bring to the community and assist in achieving them". Similar community appraisals had taken place in 1988, 1995 and 2003.

== Listed buildings ==
There are 211 listed buildings in the community, many of which are in the city of St Davids itself, but they also include some structures in the surrounding rural area, such as the present and past lifeboat stations and the ruined chapel at St Justinians.

== Worship ==
Along with St Davids Cathedral, there are numerous places of worship in the community, many scattered in the rural area surrounding the city. They include Baptist, Welsh Baptist, Congregational, Calvinistic Methodist and Independent; some are no longer active. Many of their records have been preserved by Dyfed Family History Society.
