= Saint Justinian =

Saint Justinian is the name of:

- Eastern Roman Emperor Justinian I (483–565), saint in the Eastern Orthodox tradition
- Eastern Roman Emperor Justinian II (668/669–711), saint in the Eastern Orthodox tradition
- Saint Justinian of Ramsey Island (also Stinan, Jestin or Iestin, died 6th-century), hermit who lived on Ramsey Island, near St. David's, Pembrokeshire, Wales
- Saint Lawrence Justinian (1381–1456), Bishop and first Patriarch of Venice
- St Justinian, coastal location in Pembrokeshire, Wales
