= St Justinian's Chapel =

Church in Pembrokeshire, Wales

Coordinates: 51.879047°N 5.309428°W

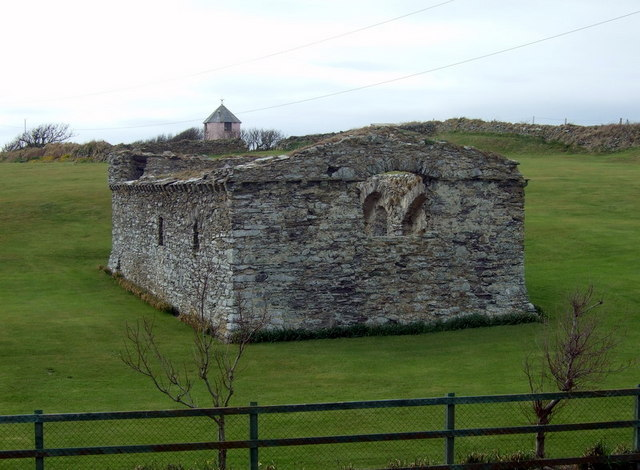

- Location in Pembrokeshire
- Country: Wales
- Denomination: Church in Wales

History
- Dedication: St Justinian

Architecture
- Heritage designation: Grade I
- Architectural type: Chapel

Specifications
- Length: 12 m (39 ft)
- Height: 4 m (13 ft)

St Justinian's Chapel in Pembrokeshire, Wales, is now a roofless shell; the current structure was probably erected in the 16th century on earlier foundations, which may date from the time of the 6th and 7th century Saint Justinian to whom it is dedicated. The chapel is a Grade I listed building.

== Location ==
The chapel is situated 3 kilometres (2 mi) west of St Davids, in the coastal area of St Justinian on the northwest extremity of Pembrokeshire.

== Description ==
The chapel is constructed of rubble stone, and in plan measures 12m x 5m and is about 4m high. There are several windows and two doors.

== History ==
The now roofless but otherwise largely intact chapel was probably originally erected in the 16th century, possibly by Bishop Vaughan (1509-22) on considerably earlier foundations, using some of the earlier structure's materials. Descriptions of the earlier structure suggest battlements, gables and a tower. The chapel's name derives from the legend that the 6th and 7th century Saint Justinian was buried there after he was murdered on Ramsey, where he was established for a time. The chapel was a place of pilgrimage for some centuries.

During his lifetime, Justinian was a confessor to St David and his bones are believed to now rest in St Davids Cathedral.

Samuel Lewis, in his 1833 Topographical Dictionary of Wales, describes the chapel as forming "a very interesting ruin in a beautiful and romantic situation".
