= Carnllundain =

Hill in Wales

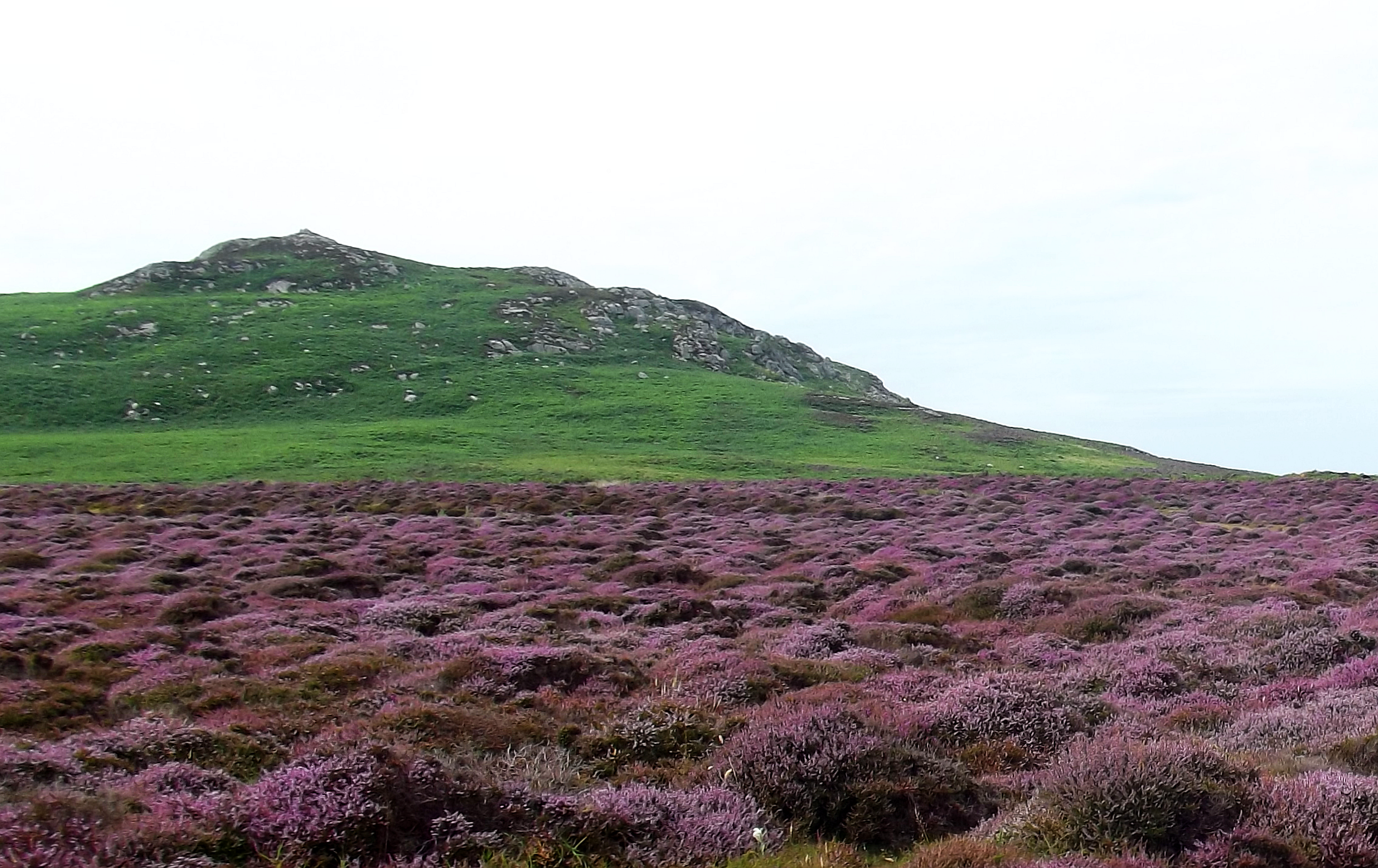

Highest point
- Elevation: 136 m (446 ft)
- Prominence: 136 m (446 ft)
- Listing: HuMP
- Coordinates: 51°51′43″N 5°20′51″W

Naming
- Language of name: Welsh

Geography
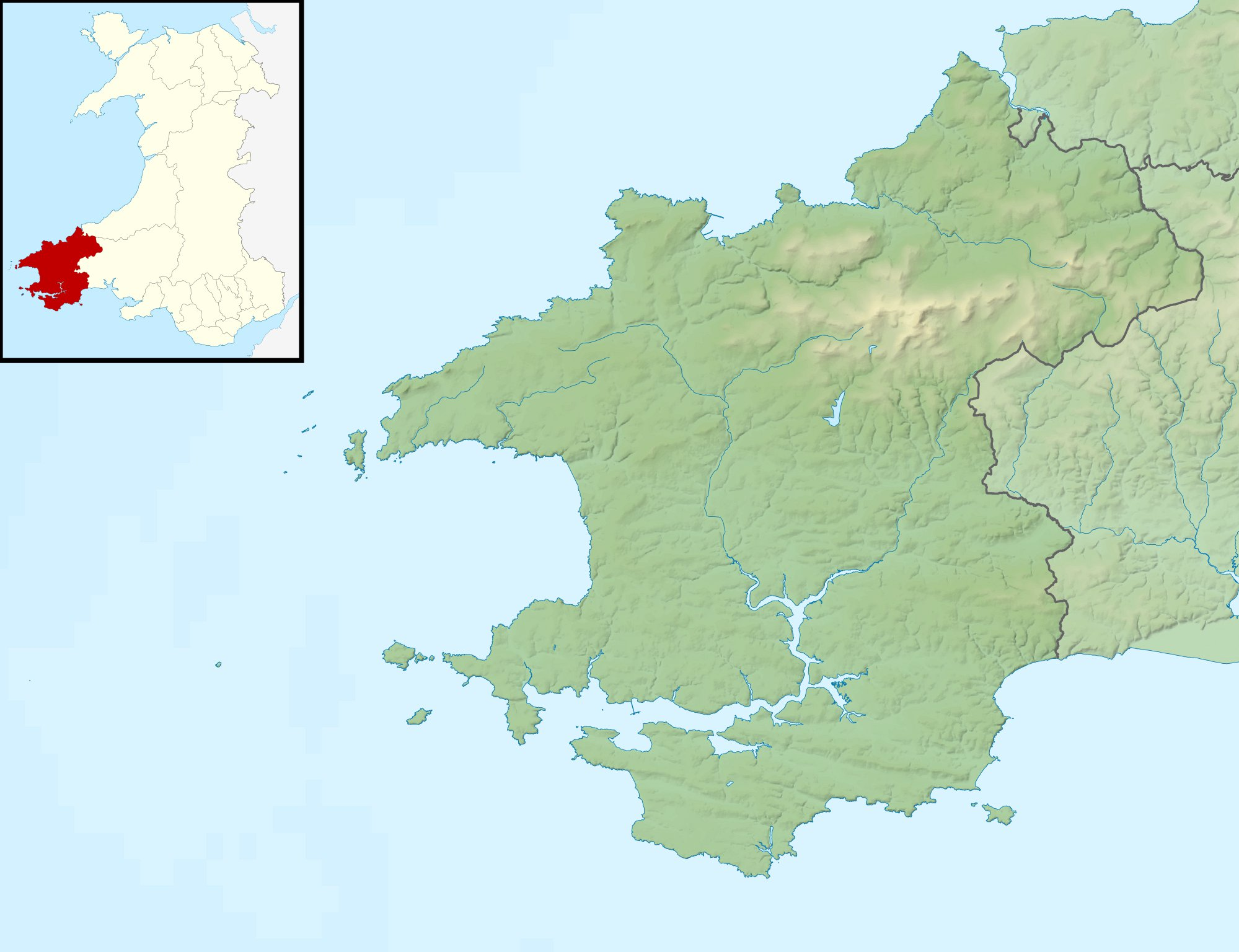
- Location within Pembrokeshire
- Location: St David's Head, Wales
- OS grid: SM6961123460

Geology
- Rock age: Cretaceous
- Mountain type: rhyolite

Climbing
- First ascent: ancestral
- Easiest route: Hike

Carnllundain or Carn Llundain is the highest elevation of Ramsey Island in Pembrokeshire, Wales.

== Geography ==
The 136-metre (446 ft) high hill stands near the west coast of Ramsey island. The top of the hill is marked by a large cairn and a trig point. On clear days it offers a view of a long stretch of Pembrokeshire coastline, Skomer Island and, across the Irish Sea, of SW Ireland.

== History ==
The area surrounding the hill is of archaeological interest and hosts some Bronze Age stone wall remains. Carn Llundain—along with Carn Ysgubor, located near the northern shore of Ramsey Island—during Middle Ages offered a useful landmark to seafaring pilgrims heading to St Davids.

== Access to the summit ==
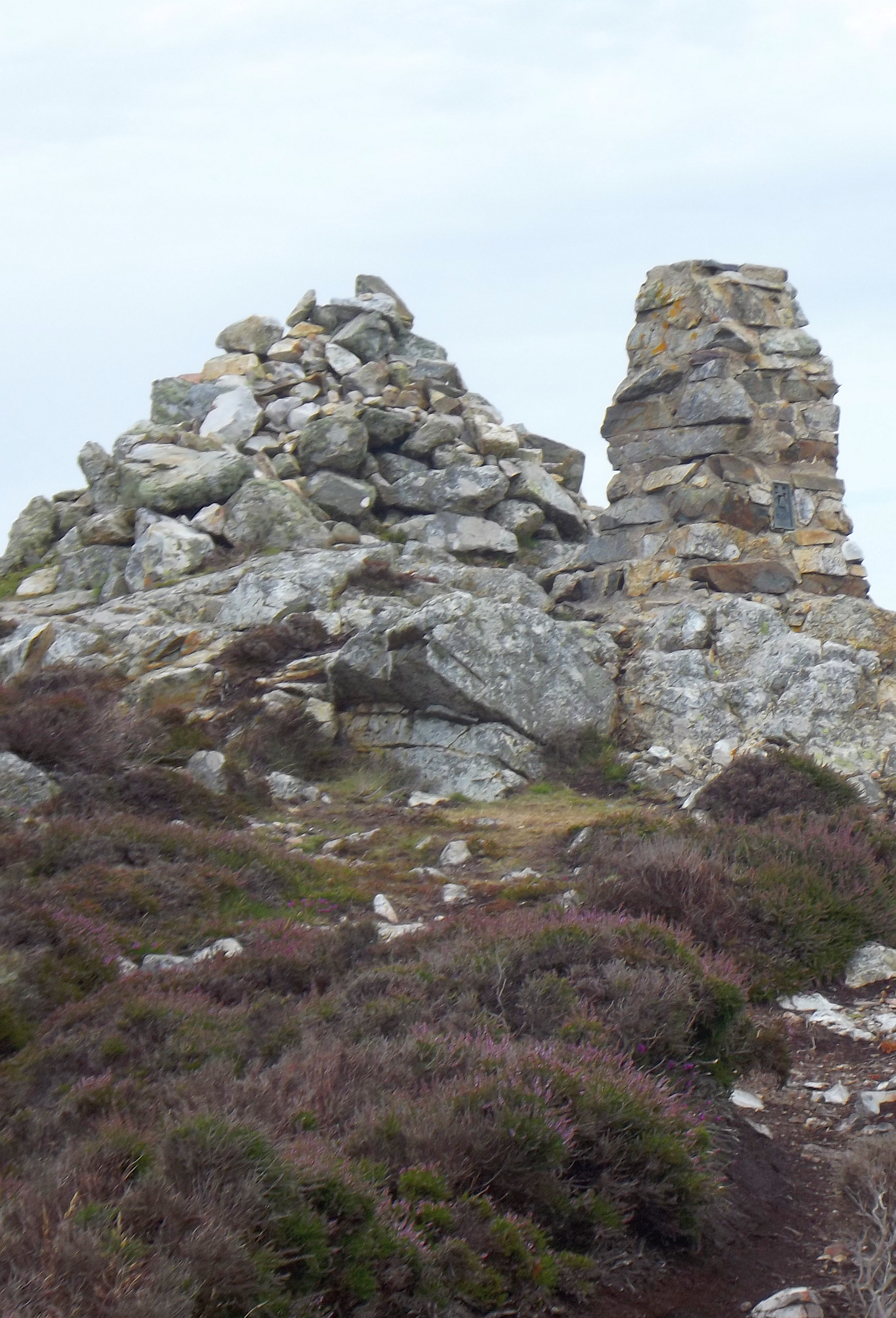
Carnllundain summit

The summit of the hill can be reached with a short waymarked diversion from the trail round the island; no special hiking ability is required, but wearing proper outdoor clothing is advisable.

== Conservation ==
Carnllundain and Ramsey Island are owned and managed by the Royal Society for the Protection of Birds (RSPB).

== See also ==
- Lists of mountains and hills in the British Isles
