= Solva Lifeboat Station =

Former RNLI lifeboat station in Pembrokeshire, Wales

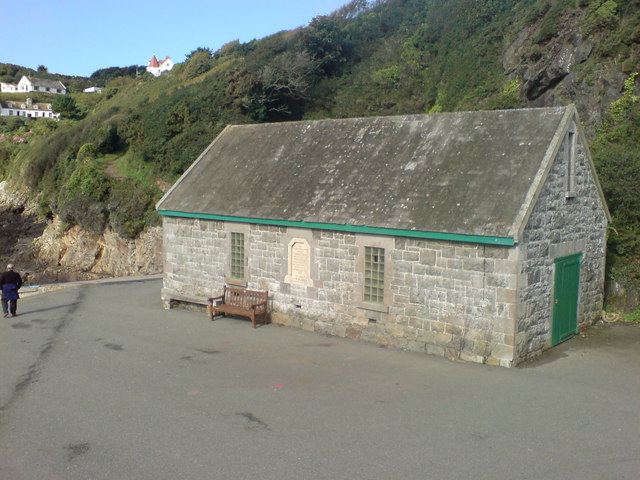
- Former lifeboat house, Solva

- Location within Pembrokeshire

General information
- Status: Closed
- Type: RNLI Lifeboat Station
- Location: Trinity Quay, Solva, Haverfordwest, Pembrokeshire, SA62 6UQ, Wales
- Coordinates: 51°52′19.6″N 5°11′42.5″W
- Opened: 11 September 1869
- Closed: 1887
- Owner: Solva Boat Owners Association

Solva Lifeboat Station was located at Trinity Quay in Solva, a village on the north shore of the River Solva estuary, on the northern side of St Brides Bay, approximately 3 miles (4.8 km) east of St David's, in Pembrokeshire, South Wales.

A lifeboat was first stationed at Solva by the Royal National Lifeboat Institution (RNLI) in 1869.

After operating for just 18 years, Solva Lifeboat Station was closed in 1887.

== History ==
When the schooner Two Brothers of Holyhead, on passage from Bangor, Caernarfonshire to Bristol, was wrecked near Pointz Castle on 5 January 1867, local man Thomas Rees was lowered down a cliff, and was able to save the crew of four, who had put off in a small boat, but which had been smashed to pieces on the rocks. Ever since its founding in 1824, the Royal National Institution for the Preservation of Life from Shipwreck (RNIPLS), later to become the RNLI in 1854, would award medals for deeds of gallantry at sea, even if no lifeboats were involved. Thomas Mortimer Rees was awarded the RNLI Silver Medal.

Following representation to the Institution by local residents, for the provision of a lifeboat at St Davids in Pembrokeshire, both St Davids and Solva were visited by the Inspector of Lifeboats, and his report was presented to the meeting of the RNLI committee of management on Thursday 3 December 1868. It was resolved to establish a lifeboat station at both locations, and both to be managed by the St David's lifeboat committee. Each were to use the same crew, to be exercised in alternate quarters.

At a later meeting, it was reported that a gift of £700 for the establishment of a lifeboat station, had been received from Mrs Margaret Egerton, in memory of her late husband, Capt. Charles Randle Egerton, RN, a long time member of the RNLI committee of management. It was resolved that the gift be appropriated to the station at Solva.

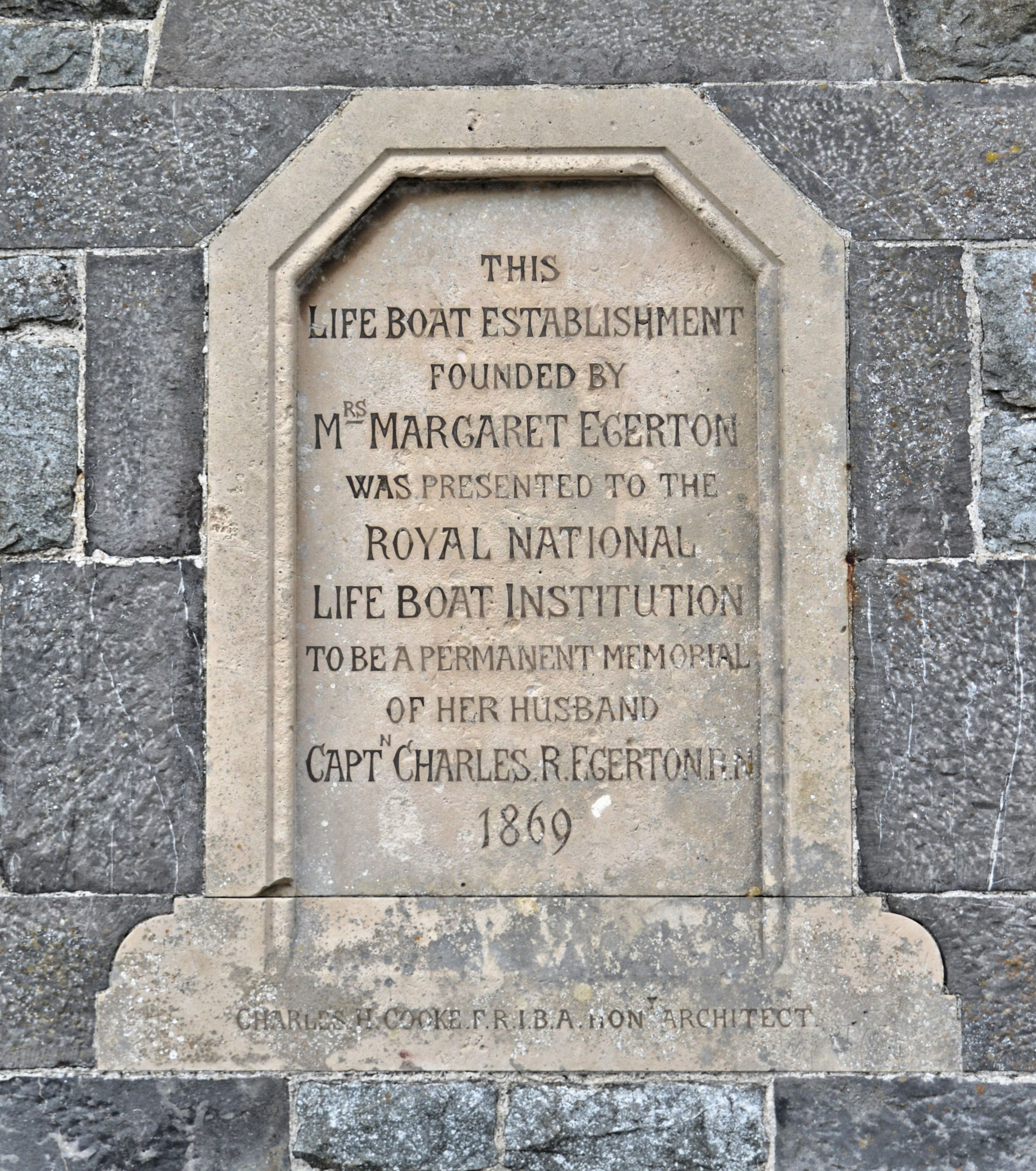
Memorial Stone

A site for the boathouse at Trinity Quay in Upper Solva, was provided by the Elder Brethren of Trinity House, who provided some building materials from the old smith's forge near the site, and granted a lease at a nominal annual rent. The boathouse was one of more than 200 designed by Honorary RNLI Architect Charles Henry Cooke FRIBA. A memorial plaque for Capt. Egerton was set into the side of the building.

The station was officially opened on the 11 September 1869, with the arrival of a new 33-foot self-righting 'Pulling and Sailing' (P&S) lifeboat, one with (12) oars, and sails. The boat had been first transported to Milford Haven, and was then towed to the station by the Trinity House steamship. At a service at the station, the lifeboat was named Charles and Margaret Egerton.

In 18 years on service, only one effective rescue was carried out. The Charles and Margaret Egerton was launched at 17:00 into a north-west gale on 22 October 1874, to the aid of the schooner Sarah of Strangford, which was totally wrecked. Four men were rescued in a service lasting 11 hours, the lifeboat not returning to shore until 04:00 the following day.

At a meeting of the RNLI committee of management on Thursday 5 May 1887, it was decided that the lifeboat station at Solva (Pembrokeshire) was to be abolished.

The lifeboat house still stands, and is currently in use with the Solva Boat Owners Association. The lifeboat on station at the time of closure, the only lifeboat to be assigned to Solva, Charles and Margaret Egerton, was sold in 1894, but no further information is known.

== Station honours ==
The following are awards made at Solva.

- RNLI Silver Medal

Thomas Mortimer Rees - 1867

== Solva lifeboat ==
ON (Note: ON is the RNLI's Official Number of the boat.)	Name	Built	On station	Class	Comments
Pre-531	Charles and Margaret Egerton	1869	1869–1887	33-foot Peake Self-righting (P&S)	(Note: 33-foot x 8-foot 1in (10-oared) Peake-class self-righting (P&S) lifeboat, gift of Margaret Egerton of Reading, Berkshire, built by Forrestt of Limehouse, London, costing £277.)

== See also ==
- List of RNLI stations
- List of former RNLI stations
- Royal National Lifeboat Institution lifeboats
