= South Bishop Lighthouse =

Lighthouse in Pembrokeshire, Wales

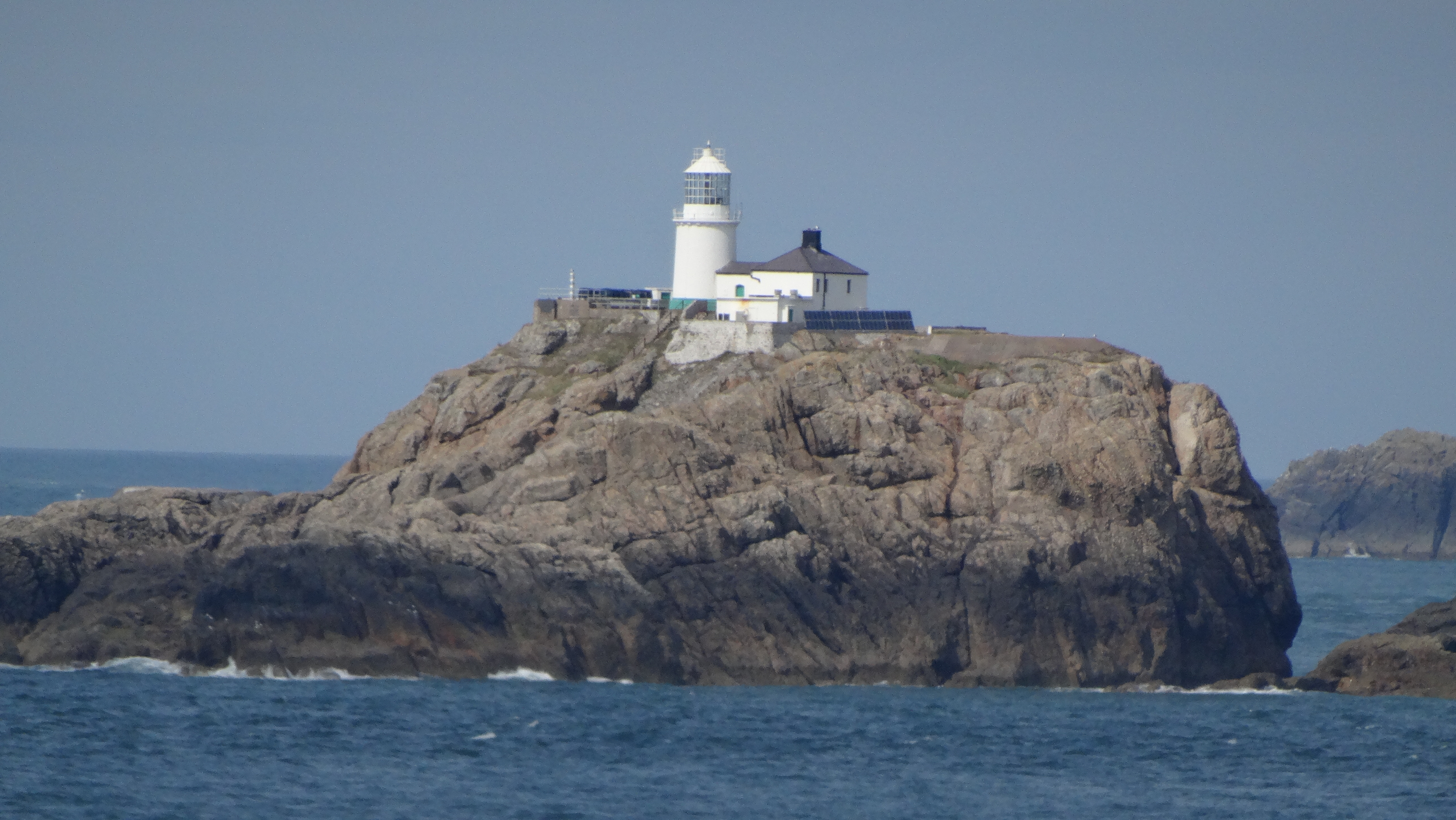
- Location: South Bishop island St George's Channel; Wales; United Kingdom
- Coordinates: 51.852714°N 5.411925°W

Tower
- Constructed: 1839
- Built by: James Walker
- Construction: granite tower
- Automated: 1983
- Height: 11 m (36 ft)
- Shape: cylindrical tower with balcony and lantern
- Markings: white tower and lantern
- Power source: solar power
- Operator: Trinity House
- Heritage: Grade II listed building
- Fog signal: 3 blasts every 45s. (range of 2 nmi (3.7 km))

Light
- Focal height: 44 m (144 ft)
- Lens: 4th Order Catadioptric
- Intensity: 60,000 CD
- Range: 16 nmi (30 km)
- Characteristic: Fl W 5s.

The South Bishop Lighthouse is a lighthouse on South Bishop Island (also known as Emsger), a small rock approximately 5 miles (8 km) west of St Davids Head in Pembrokeshire, Wales.

== History ==
In 1831 the traders of the port of Cardigan made an application to build a light, and this was authorised in 1834. Designed by James Walker, the lighthouse was built on the island in 1839, acting both as a waymark for vessels navigating offshore and as assistance to ships navigating around the Bishops and Clerks island group.

The lighthouse was converted to electric operation in 1959, and in 1971 a helipad was constructed at the site. Finally, the lighthouse was automated and demanned in 1983.

Like many in the UK, it is now monitored from the control centre at Trinity House in Harwich, Essex, England.

== Architecture ==
The tower is built of granite, and is circular with a slight taper. A cornice at the top of the tower has iron railings, this is unusual in lighthouses designed by James Walker. Accommodation for the keepers was provided in two adjoining houses, which were built at the same time as the tower. Other buildings accommodate equipment.

== Seabirds ==
It was built in the path of many migrating sea birds, and the brilliance of the light at night often led the birds to dash themselves against the lantern. Many died and, when Trinity House and the Royal Society for the Protection of Birds teamed up, together they came to the conclusion to build special bird perches on the side of the lighthouse lantern. After this the number of deaths decreased considerably.

== See also ==
- List of lighthouses in Wales
- Trinity House
