= Ynys Bery =

Island of Pembrokeshire, Wales

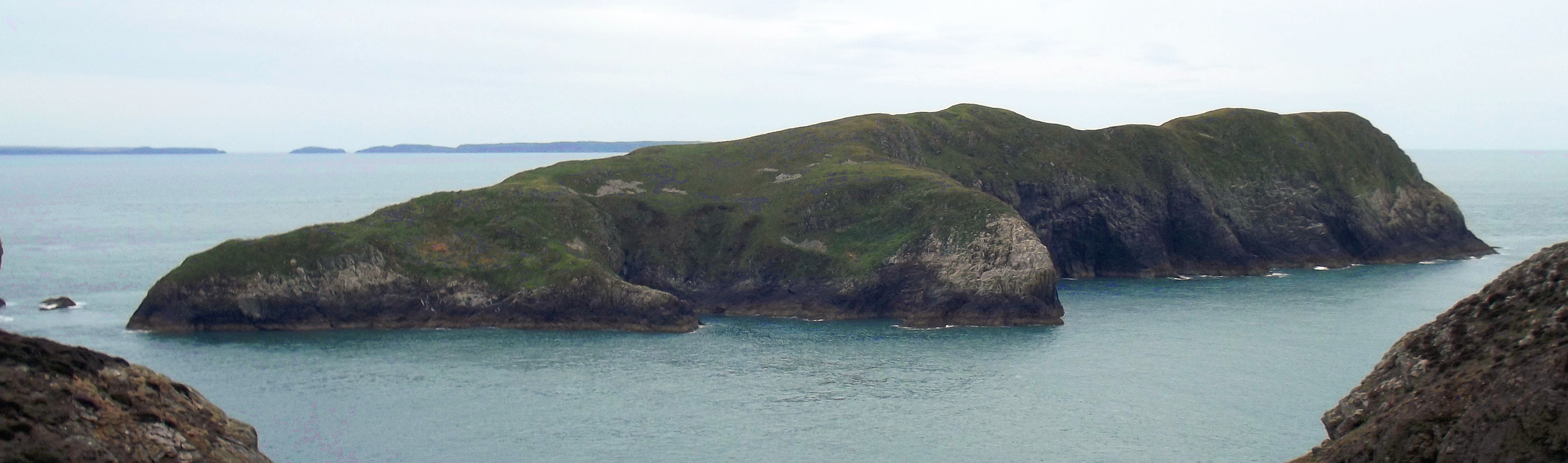
- Ynys Bery from Ramsey Island

- Location within Wales

Geography
- Coordinates: 51°50′56.72″N 5°20′27.02″W

Administration
- Wales
- County: Pembrokeshire
- St David's and the Cathedral Close: community

Demographics
- Population: 0

Ynys Bery is a small island south of Ramsey Island, Pembrokeshire, Wales, in the community of St David's and the Cathedral Close.

== Etymology ==
The island's name in Welsh means falcon's Island, according to an 1852 book, but an earlier work of 1811 by Richard Fenton calls it the kite's island.

== History ==
Fenton, in 1811, describes the island, and its neighbour Ynys y Cantwr:

...with high craggy cliffs, producing a thick matted herbage mixed with scurvy-grass and the sea pink, affording pasture for a few sheep, and stocked with rabbits, puffins, elygogs, (Note: 'Elygogs' probably means guillemots.) gulls and other sea fowl.

In 1903, the S.S. Graffoe (a 2,996-ton steamship bound from Glasgow to Montevideo with 3,800 tons of coal) struck Ramsey Island and sank at the northern end of Ynys Bery. The wreck lies at a depth of 15 metres, and is one of many Pembrokeshire wrecks popular with divers.

== Geography ==
Ynys Bery's highest point is 71 metres (233 feet), the highest of Wales's islets.

== Flora and fauna ==
Together with neighbouring Ynys Cantwr, Ynys Bery is a breeding ground for lesser black-backed gulls. In the spring the island is covered with pale blue squill.
