= Aber Mawr Formation =

Geologial formation in Wales

- Stratigraphic range: Arenig
- Type: Geological formation
- Underlies: Porth Lauog Formation
- Thickness: >215 m (705 ft)

Lithology
- Primary: Mudstone
- Other: Tuff, debrite

Location
- Country: Wales
- Extent: Ramsey Island

Type section
- Named for: Aber Mawr Bay, Ramsey Island

The Aber Mawr Formation is a geological formation in Wales. It preserves fossils dating back to the Arenig Series of the Ordovician period.

== See also ==
- List of fossiliferous stratigraphic units in Wales
