= Justinian of Ramsey Island =

Saint Justinian

Confessor
- Born: 5th century Brittany
- Died: 6th century Ramsey Island, Pembrokeshire
- Venerated in: Eastern Orthodox church Roman Catholic Church; Anglican Communion
- Major shrine: St David's Cathedral
- Feast: 5 December

Saint Justinian (Welsh: Stinan, Jestin, Iestin) was a 6th-century hermit who lived on Ramsey Island, near St. David's, in the Welsh county of Pembrokeshire.

== Traditional life ==
Tradition states that he was a Breton nobleman who settled on the island of Ramsey as a hermit. Justinian would stand in the cold sea praying for hours, believing the extreme discipline helped him focus on God. He was visited by Saint David who was so impressed with his holiness that he made him his confessor and abbot of the monastery on the mainland. However, Justinian became disillusioned with the poor attitude of the monks at St David's and took himself away the short distance to remote Ramsey Island to establish a more holy spiritual community. His more loyal monks followed him. Legend has it that he was eventually murdered by some disgruntled servants or monks fed up with his strict regime, it is said by beheading him.

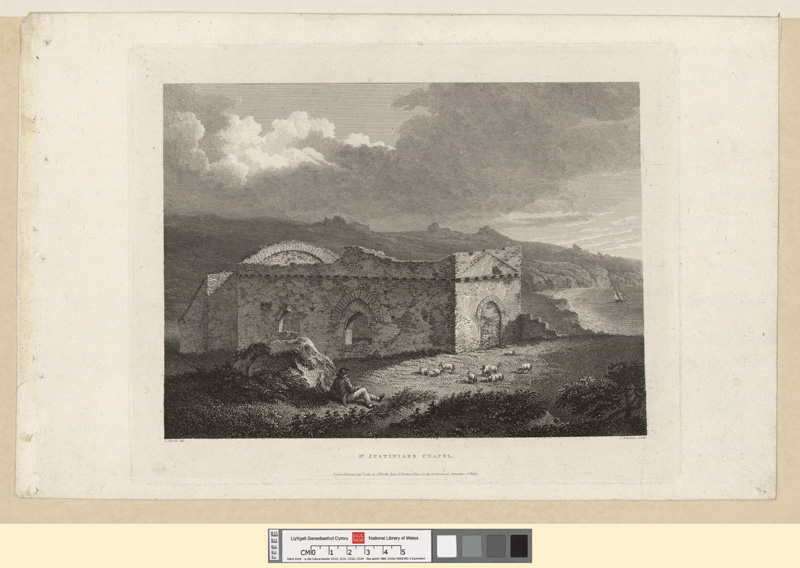
St. Justinians Chapel 2 August 1810

Apparently, he picked up his head and crossed Ramsey Sound walking on the water carrying his head in his arms and his body was buried in the small ruined chapel which still stands on the mainland at St Justinian's, immediately opposite his island home; his bones were later moved to St Davids Cathedral. During the reformation, Bishop William Barlow was strongly opposed to the veneration of relics, pilgrimages, and other Catholic practices. In an attempt to suppress the cult of St David, at St David's Cathedral, in 1538 he stripped St David's shrine of its jewels and confiscated the relics of St David and St Justinian in order to counteract "superstition".

== Veneration ==
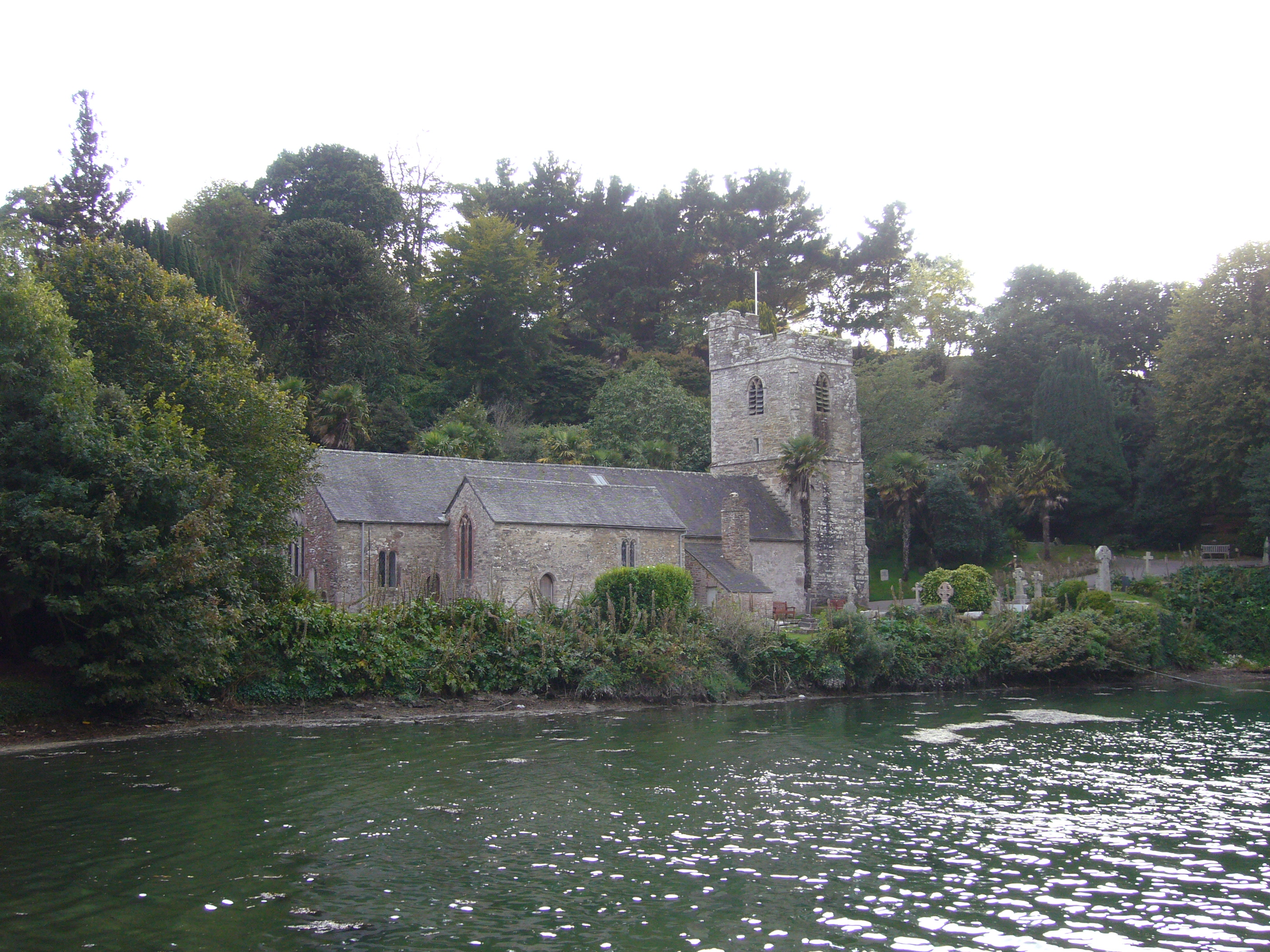
St Just in Roseland church

Justinian is listed on very ancient Welsh calendars of saints and martyrs.

Archaeological studies indicate an early medieval ecclesiastical site on the Ramsey Island. There may have been a chapel "dedicated to St Justinian and thought to have possibly been located at the southerly end of the island."

St Justinian in St Davids and the Cathedral Close is named for him. St Justinian's Well (a 19th-century stone enclosure over an ancient spring) is located here. The bay on which St Justinian is located is called Porthstinian.

St Just in Roseland is also named for him, and the Anglican church at Llanstinan, near Fishguard, is dedicated to him. The small church at Freystrop, near Haverfordwest, is also dedicated to him.
