= Ramsey Island =

Island in Pembrokeshire, Wales

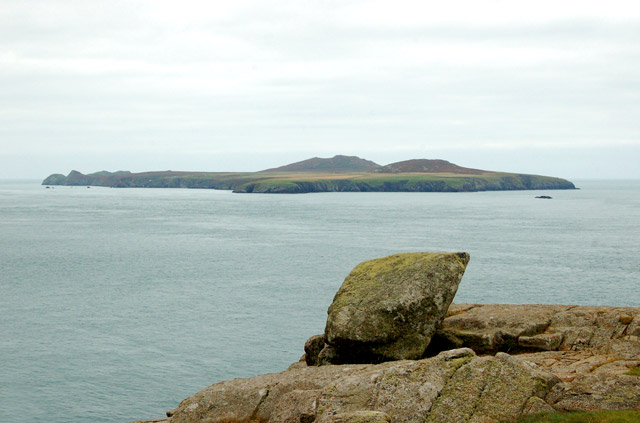
- Ramsey Island viewed from St David's Head

- Location within Wales

Geography
- Location: St Brides Bay
- Coordinates: 51°51′42″N 5°20′34″W
- Length: 3.2 km (1.99 mi)
- Highest elevation: 136 m (446 ft)
- Highest point: Carnllundain

Administration
- Wales
- County: Pembrokeshire

Demographics
- Population: 2
- Ethnic groups: Welsh people

Ramsey Island (Welsh: Ynys Dewi) is an island about 1 kilometre (1/2 nautical mile) off St David's Head in Pembrokeshire on the northern side of St Brides Bay, in southwest Wales, in the community of St Davids and the Cathedral Close. It is 259 hectares (640 acres) in area and is owned by the Royal Society for the Protection of Birds.

Ramsey means (in Old Norse) Hrafn's island.

In Welsh the island is named after Saint David (Dewi Sant), the patron saint of Wales. It was the home of his confessor, Saint Justinian. The nearest large settlement is the city of St David's.

Ramsey Island is less than 3.2 kilometres (2 mi) long and its highest point is 136 metres (446 ft) above sea level at Carnllundain, and is listed as a HuMP. It is the fourth largest island in Wales, after Anglesey, Holy Island and Skomer, and is surrounded by a number of islets, tidal islands and rocks.

== Geology ==
The island has a diverse geology for a relatively small area; it comprises sedimentary, volcanic and intrusive igneous rocks dating from the early Palaeozoic Era. The larger part of the north of the island is formed from mudstones of the Tetragraptus Mudstone Formation (also known as the 'Penmaen Dewi Shale Formation' and again as the 'Road Uchaf Formation' (sic) after the Rhod Uchaf locality on the island's east coast). However Carnysgubor stands proud to their west as it is formed from a more resistant microtonalite intrusion. In contrast the coastal cliffs between Trwyn-drain-du and Trwyn-Sion-Owen and also between Trwyn Ogof Hen and Rhod Uchaf are formed by sedimentary rocks, the mica-rich Lingula Flags and the sandstones and mudstones of the Ogof Hen Formation. The rock strata are typically steeply tilted and commonly faulted.

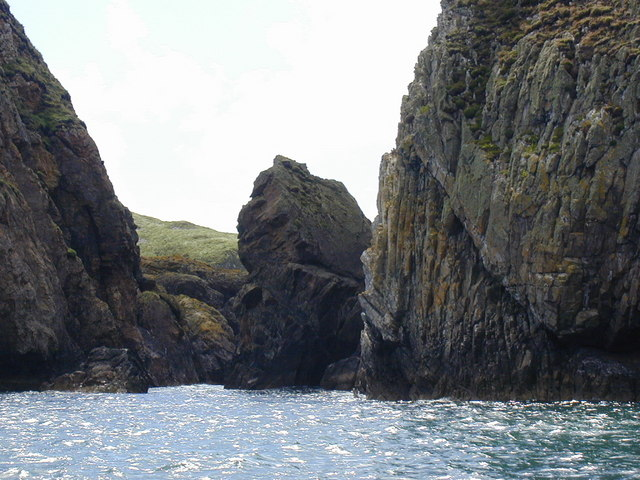
Southern end of Ramsey Island

Running NW–SE across the centre of the island from Aber Mawr to the vicinity of The Bitches is a band of late Arenig age tuffs and 'pencil slates' assigned to the Aber Mawr Formation. Its boundary with the sediments to the north is a fault.

The south of the island is dominated by a rhyolite intrusion as are the islets off its southern coast. To the west of the Ramsey Fault which runs from Aber Mawr to Porth Lleuog, is Carnllundain which is formed from the tough rhyolitic tuffs of the Carn Llundain Formation. These tuffs arose as volcanic ash falls, ash flows and turbidite deposits. Smaller areas of dark grey mudstones interbedded with debris flows grouped together as the Porth Llauog Formation occur around the margins of the rhyolite. Part of the southern margin of the inlet of Aber Mawr is characterised by the mudstones and sandstones of the Trwyn Llundain Formation, a part of the Solva Group of Cambrian rocks.

== Archaeology ==
Surveys in the 1990s and more recently discovered evidence of prehistoric cairns, field systems, barrows and other anomalies which suggest human activity on the island dates back up to 5,000 years. Mediaeval sites include a holy well and cemetery from the 9th century.

== Recorded history ==
From 1082, the island was part of the cantref of Dewisland under the control of the bishops of St David's. In the 12th century, it was a place of pilgrimage; St Tyfanog's Chapel existed up to the 1600s, when it was described as "decayed", and there may also have been a chapel to St Justinian.

In the 13th century, the island was reported to be fertile, producing beef, sheep, goats, wheat, barley and oats. In the 14th century, 100 acres (40 hectares) of the island supported horses, cattle and sheep. Rabbits, rushes, heath and birds' eggs were harvested. A farmhouse, corn mill and lime kiln were recorded in the 16th century, but the farm building was a ruin by the early 19th century. The mill and kiln were in operation until the early 20th century, and in 1905 the island was sold into private hands and ceased being an ecclesiastical holding. A new farmhouse was built early in the 19th century, and was Grade II listed by Cadw in 1992.

== Nature reserve ==
Owned and managed by the Royal Society for the Protection of Birds (RSPB), the island has spectacular bird cliffs, coastal scenery and heathland. It is one of the best sites in Wales to see choughs, which are attracted by an ample supply of dung beetles.

Other breeding species include ravens, common buzzards, peregrines, northern wheatears, gulls, auks, Manx shearwaters, razorbills and guillemots.

Ramsey has the most important grey seal breeding colony in southern Britain, with over 400 seal pups born each autumn. In October 2017 the remnants of Hurricane Ophelia were responsible for some 90 seal pup deaths.

With a permanent population of just two human residents, the RSPB Warden and Assistant Warden who live in a farmhouse there, the island is otherwise uninhabited. Tourist boats sail around the island and a ferry service run by Thousand Islands Expeditions operates from Easter to 31 October from St Davids Lifeboat Station on the mainland.

== Ramsey Sound ==
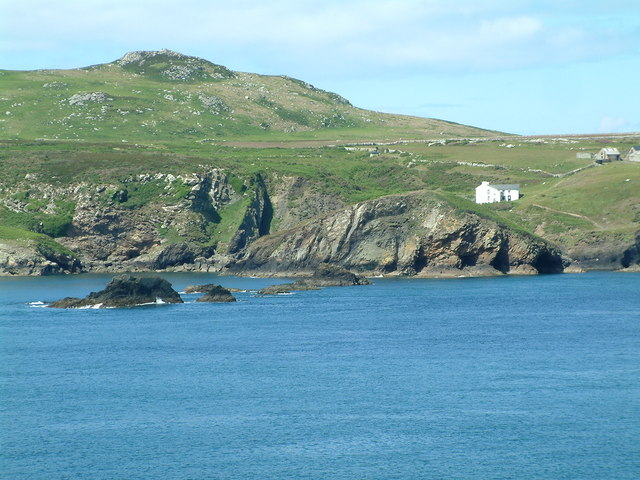
The Bitches in Ramsey Sound, with the farmhouse on Ramsey

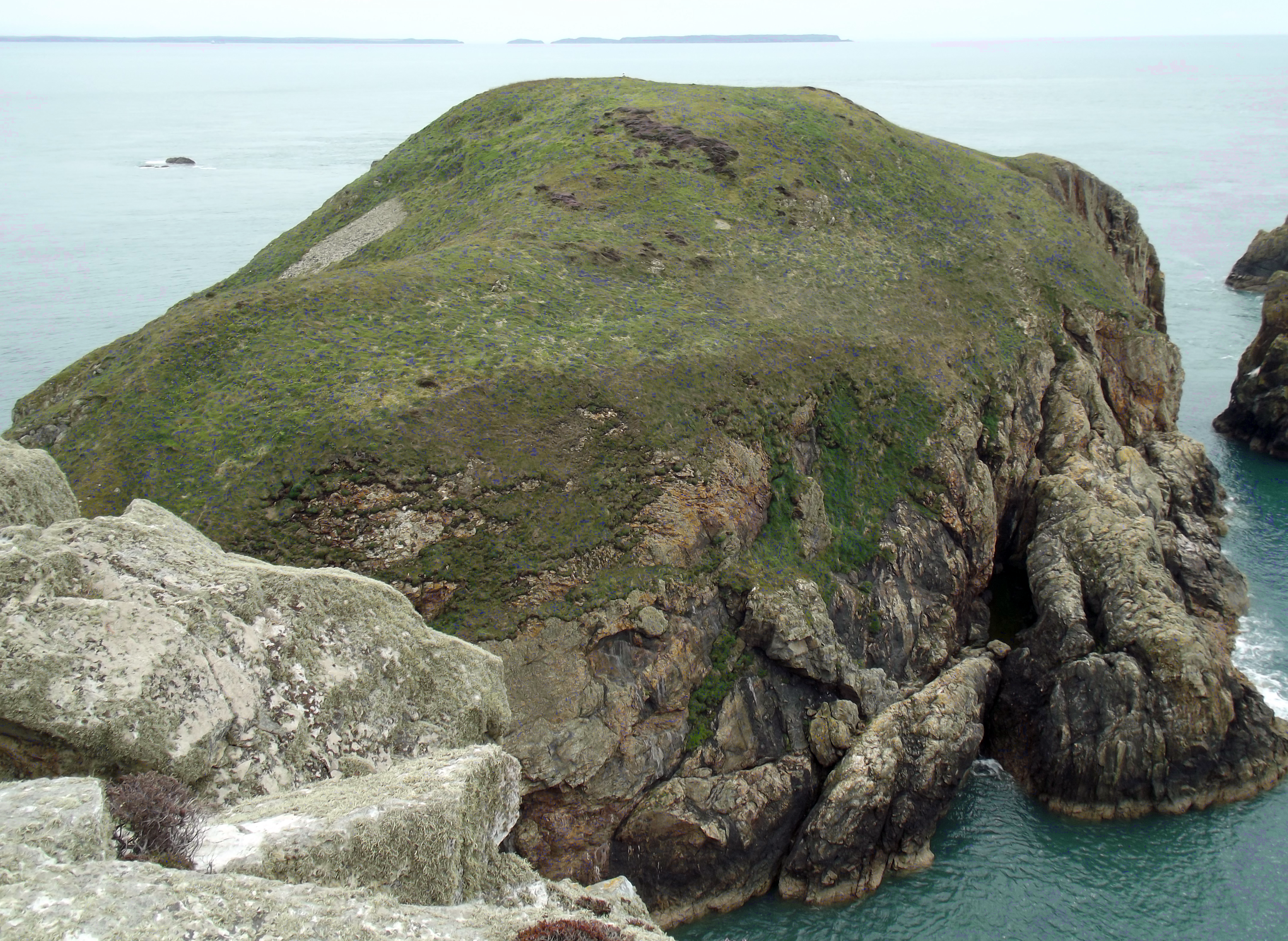
Ynys Cantwr seen from Ramsey Island

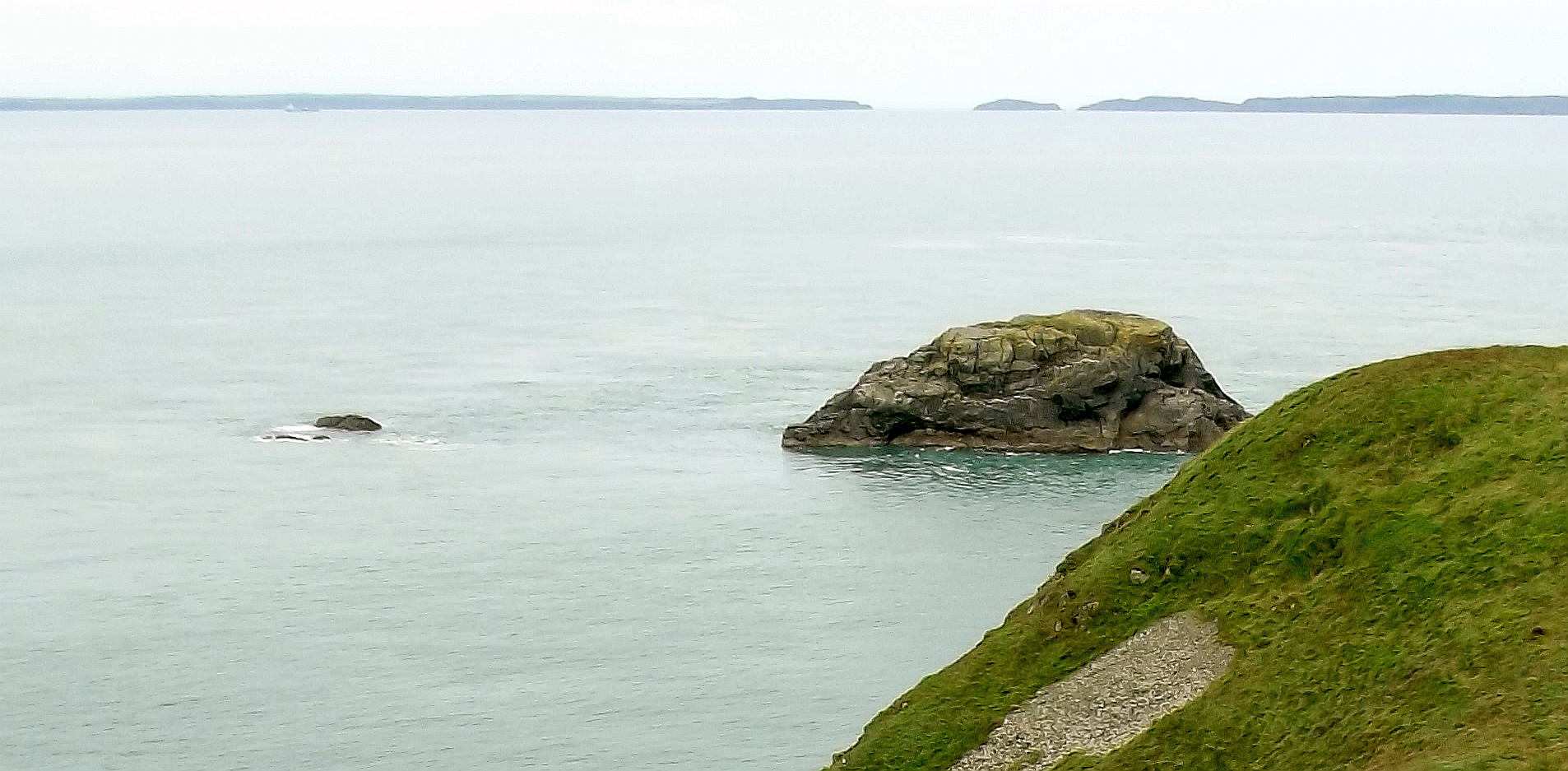
Ynys Eilun (r) and Pont yr Eilun (just visible, l), from Ynys Cantwr

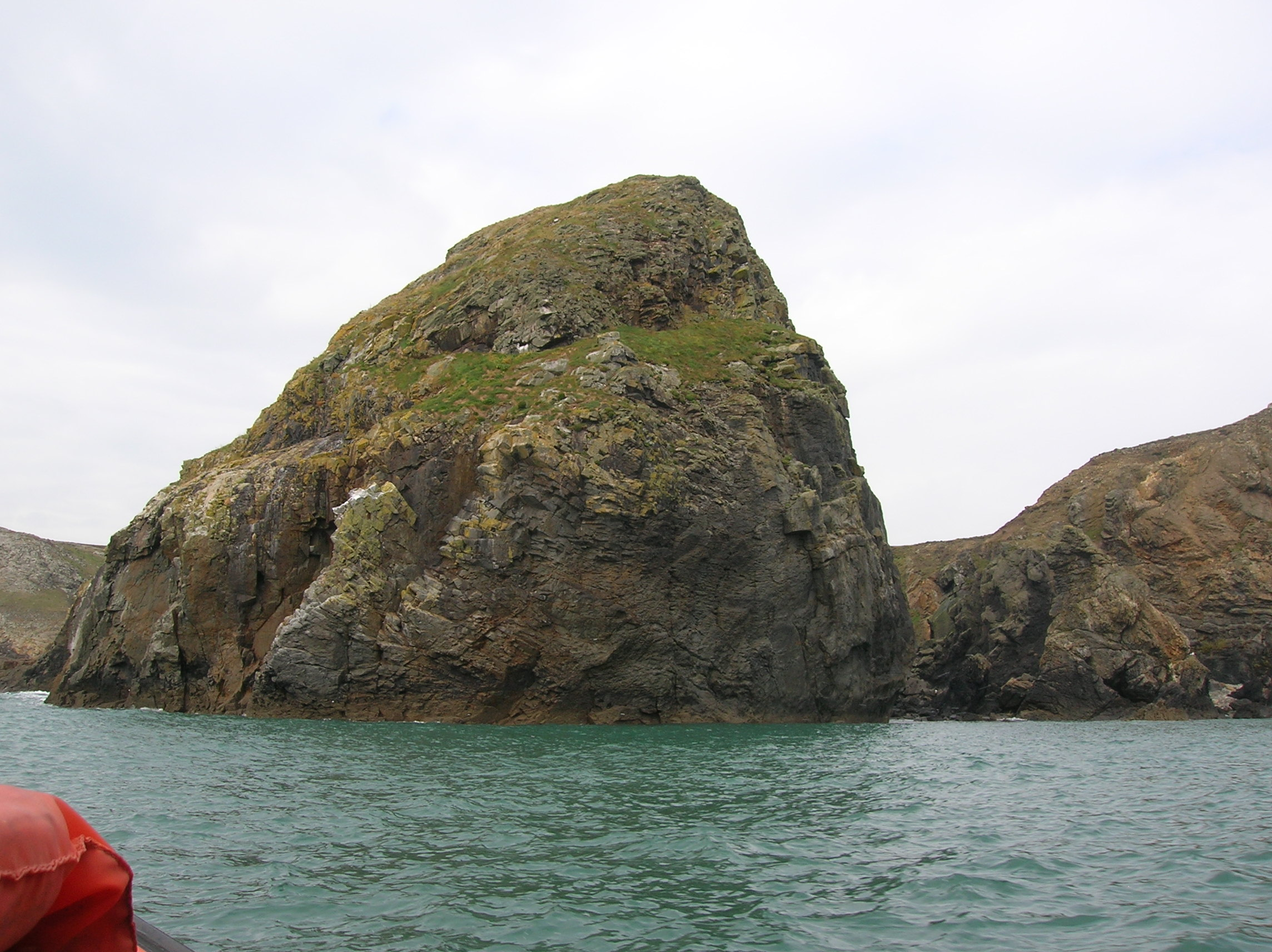
Ynys Gwelltog, viewed from the sea

The waters around the island have significant tidal effects, and tidal waterfalls occur between The Bitches. The asymmetrical underwater flow can be 3.8 m/s (12 ft/s) northward (flood) and 1.9 m/s (6.2 ft/s) southward (ebb), with some turbulence. The sound reaches some 66 metres (217 feet; 36 fathoms) deep, although a tidal island called Horse Rock protrudes from the water at low tide; the name of the rock was recorded as early as 1583, on an Elizabethan map.

A 400 kW tidal power turbine project was planned from 2014 and the first turbine of three was installed in December 2015. Unfortunately the turbine developed faults shortly after installation, and the developer Tidal Energy Ltd was placed into administration in October 2016.

Ramsey Island is surrounded by a number of smaller islands, islets and rock clusters, including:

- Bancyn-ffald
- The Bitches
- The Bishops and Clerks group, including:
  - Carreg Rhoson and Maen Rhoson
  - Carreg-trai
  - Cribog
  - Daufraich and Maen Daufraich
  - Emsger or South Bishop (37 metres, 121 feet)
  - Llechau-isaf and Llechau-uchaf
  - Moelyn
  - North Bishop (44 metres, 144 feet)
- Carreg-gwylan
- Meini Duon (Black Rocks) is the name given to three sea rocks approximately 5/8 mile (1.0 kilometre) south of Ramsey Island, not far from the Bishops and Clerks. They are made of acid intrusive rock, and are the furthest south-west of the group of small islets and rocks off this coast.
- Trwynmynachdy
- Ynys Bery (Falcon Island) (71 metres, 233 feet)
- Ynys Cantwr (Precentor's Island; formerly owned by the precentors of St David's.), a small tidal island south of Ramsey Island. Its highest point is 54 metres (177').
- Ynys Eilun (5 acres (2 hectares), length 850 feet (260 metres)) and Pont yr Eilun are two islets about 1/4 mile (400 metres) east of Ynys Bery. Visiting the island is not easy because of its difficult landing. The surrounding waters are swept by a northeast current caused by Ynys Eilun itself.
- Ynys Gwelltog (Grassy Island; 56 metres, 184 feet), a tidal island, in the past considered suitable for pasturing two sheep.
