= Emsger =

Island in Pembrokeshire, Wales

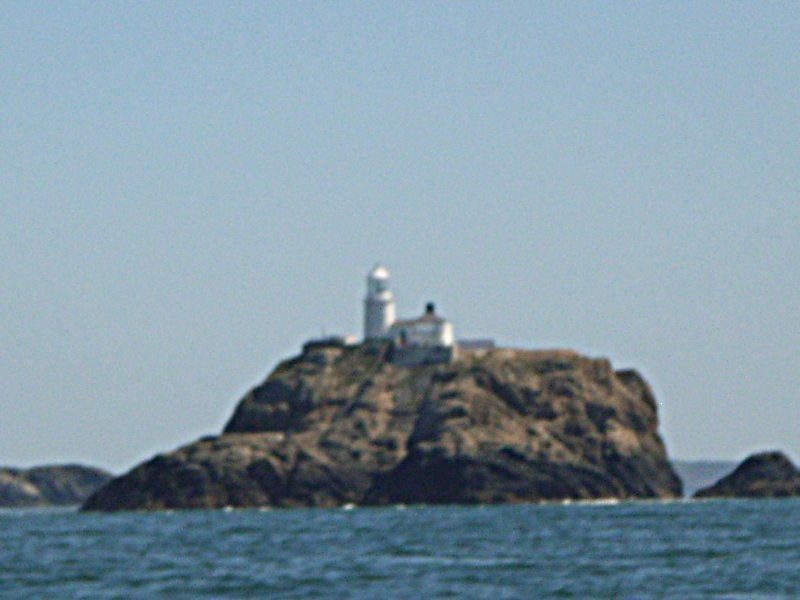

- Location within Wales

Geography
- Coordinates: 51°51′05.51″N 5°24′43.88″W
- Archipelago: Bishops and Clerks
- Area: 1.4 ha (3.5 acres)

Administration
- Wales
- County: Pembrokeshire

Demographics
- Population: 0

Emsger or South Bishop is an islet situated west of Ramsey Island, Pembrokeshire, Wales. It is the largest of the Bishops and Clerks group of islets and rocks.

== Etymology ==
Its name can also be shown as Em-sger, Emskir or Emskyr. The second element is from Old Norse sker – a skerry, an isolated rock in the sea.

== Lighthouse ==
The South Bishop Lighthouse, designed by James Walker, was built on the island and started operating in 1839.

It reaches a height of 37 metres (121 feet), North Bishop reaching 44 metres (144 feet).
