= St Justinian =

Place in Pembrokeshire, Wales

Coordinates: 51°52′40″N 05°18′36″W

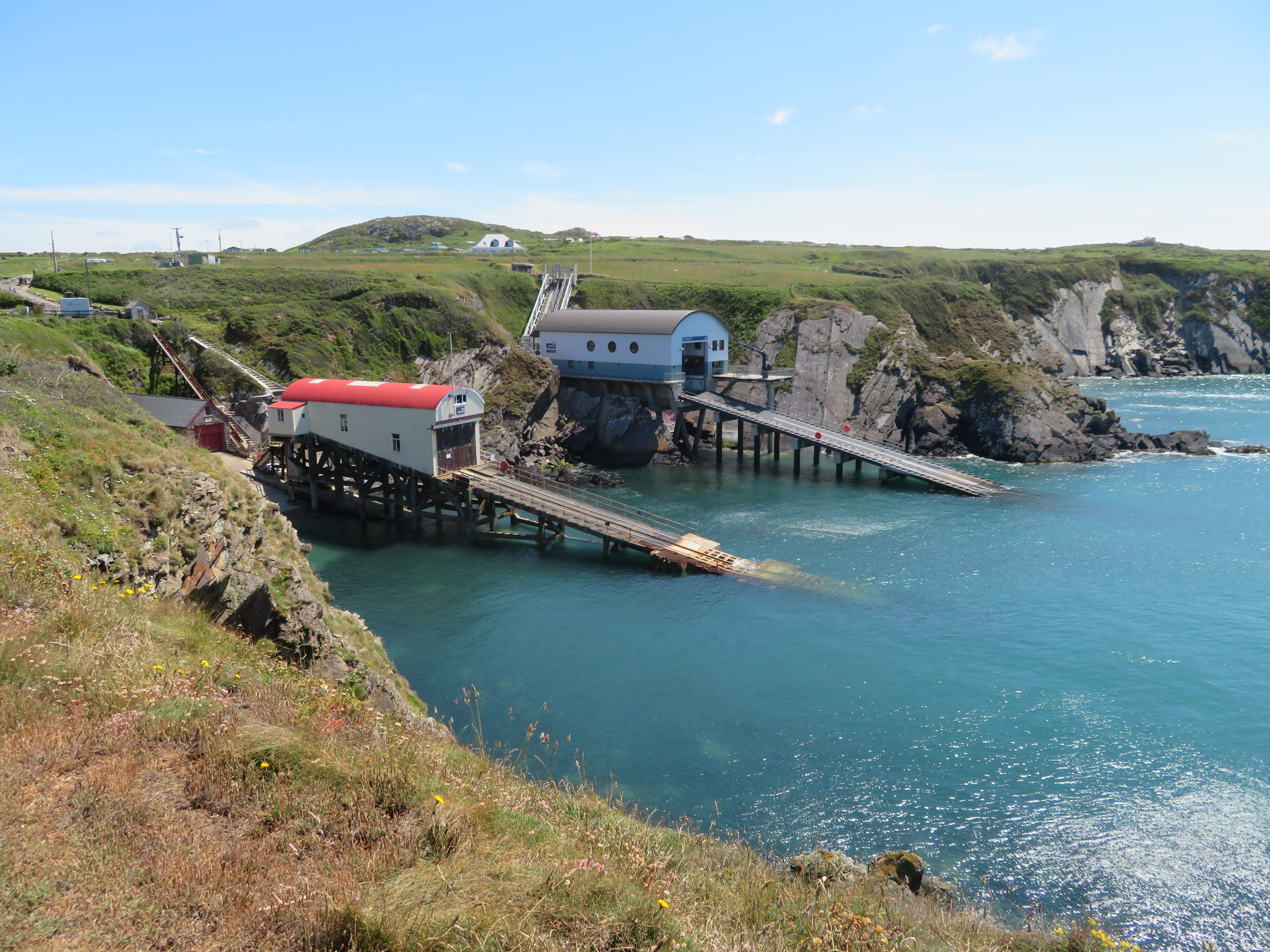
Lifeboat Stations at St Justinian harbour

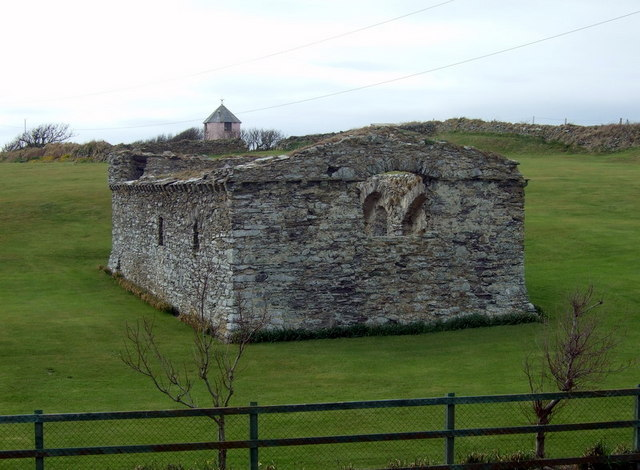
The ruined chapel of St Justinian

St Justinian (or St Justinian's or St Justinians; Welsh: Porth Stinan) is a coastal location of indeterminate area in the extreme northwest of Pembrokeshire, Wales, in the community of St Davids and the Cathedral Close.

== Name ==
The area is named for Stinan (later Anglicised to Justinian), a 6th-7th century monk who was a contemporary of St David. Legend says that he was murdered by beheading and that his skull had miraculous properties.

== Description ==
There is a small harbour, Porthstinan, housing the current St Davids Lifeboat Station, two former lifeboat stations and a private residence. The harbour is used for boat trips to Ramsey Island, and for kayaking and speedboat trips. It is a popular access point for the Pembrokeshire Coast Path.

== History ==
St Justinian (as Sct. Stenans) appears on a 1578 parish map of Pembrokeshire.

== Listed buildings ==
The ruined chapel of St Justinian is a Grade I listed building. The 1870s old lifeboat house, 1911 lifeboat house, an early 20th century watchtower and St Justinian's Well (a 19th-century stone enclosure over an ancient spring), are all Grade II listed.

== Geography ==
The bay on which St Justinian stands is known as Porthstinian.
