= St Davids Lifeboat Station =

RNLI lifeboat station in Pembrokeshire, Wales

- Gorsaf Bad Achub Tyddewi

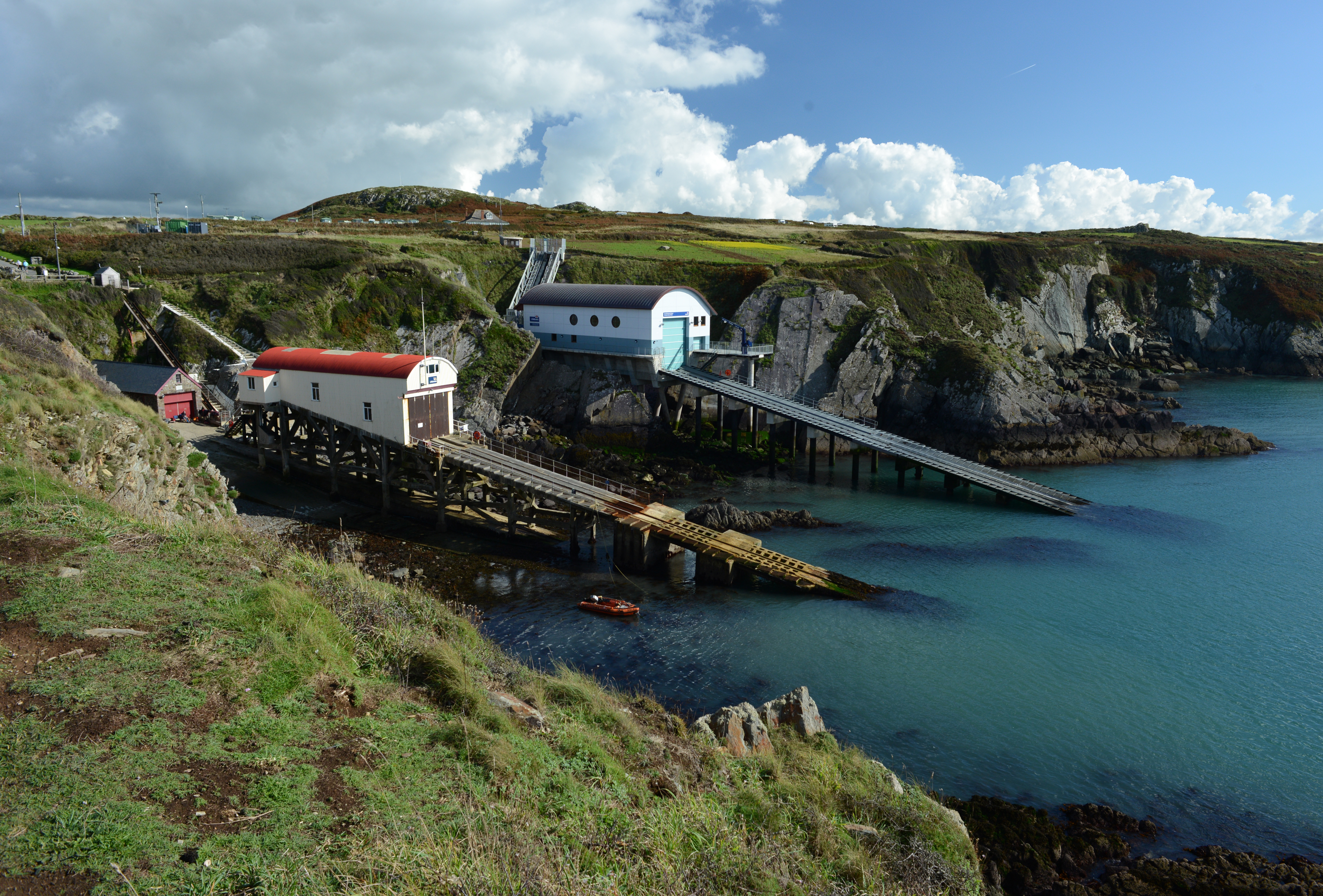
- Three boathouses shown in 2016 (newest on right)

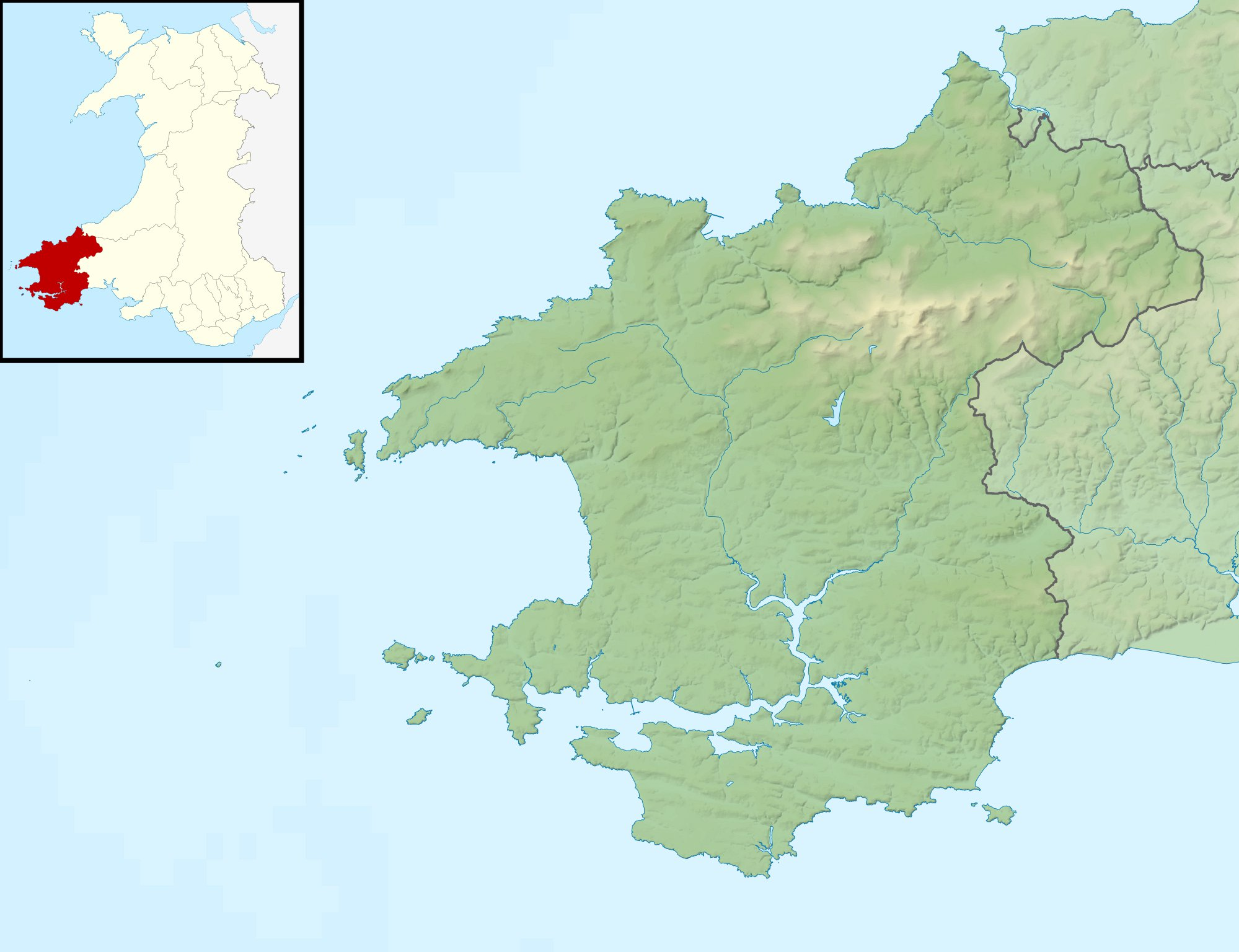
- Location within Pembrokeshire

General information
- Type: RNLI Lifeboat Station
- Location: St Justinian, St Davids, Pembrokeshire, Wales, SA62 6PY, UK
- Coordinates: 51.87905°N 5.30897°W
- Opened: 1869
- Owner: Royal National Lifeboat Institution

Website
- St Davids RNLI Lifeboat Station

St Davids Lifeboat Station (Welsh: Gorsaf Bad Achub Tyddewi) is located at St Justinian, overlooking Ramsey Sound to Ramsey Island, approximately 2.5 miles (4.0 km) west of the cathedral city of St Davids, in the county of Pembrokeshire, West Wales.

A lifeboat was first placed at St Davids in 1869, by the Royal National Lifeboat Institution (RNLI). By 2010, it had been involved in saving over 360 lives at sea, having launched more than 420 times.

The station currently operates a Tamar-class All-weather lifeboat (ALB), 16-26 Norah Wortley (ON 1306), on station since 2013, and the much smaller D-class (IB1) inshore lifeboat (ILB), Marian and Alan Clayton (D-840), on station since 2019.

== History ==
At a meeting of the RNLI committee of management on 5 November 1868, it was decided to dispatch the Inspector of Lifeboats to visit St David's, Pembrokeshire, following a letter from H. Hicks, surgeon, who had stated the necessity of a lifeboat in the area. At a later meeting on 3 December 1868, on receipt of the Inspector's report, it was decided to establish a station at St David's, "where it would be in a central position, and command the whole of St. Bride's Bay; and where it could be launched from several beaches on either side of St. David's". It was also decided to appropriate to the station, the sum of £420, presented to the Institution by the Earl of Dartmouth and his tenantry, for the purchase of a lifeboat.

In April 1869, a new 32-foot self-righting 'Pulling and Sailing' (P&S) lifeboat, one with sails and (10) oars, was transported to Pattingham in Staffordshire, to be exhibited at Patshull Hall, home of the Earl of Dartmouth. There the lifeboat was named Augusta, after Augusta Legge, Countess of Dartmouth, before being launched on trial in the 75-acre Great Lake. The lifeboat was then transported to Haverfordwest, first being launched on display at Solva, before arriving at St David's.

It was also resolved to establish a lifeboat station at both St David's and at Solva, both managed by the St David's lifeboat committee. Each was to use the same crew, to be exercised in alternate quarters.

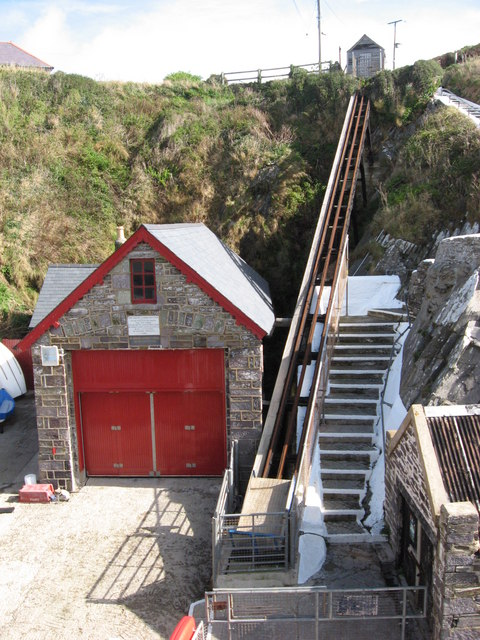
The 1869 boathouse at St. Justinian

A boathouse was built at the bottom of the cliff at St Justinian, at a cost of £179-10s, but wasn't completed before the lifeboat arrived. During construction, the lifeboat was kept in premises in the town.

St David's lifeboat Augusta was launched about 13:00 on 15 October 1880, to reports of the brigantine Messenger of Exeter drifting, with her sails blown away. The vessel, on passage from Teignmouth to Runcorn with a cargo of clay, struck the Wain Garrig rock, 2 mi (3.2 km) north of Ramsey Island. Three crew scrambled onto the rocks, only for the vessel to come free, and drift away, with the Master and two crew still aboard. The lifeboat rescued the three men from the rock, but there was no sign of the Messenger. It was later discovered that the vessel had foundered whilst making for Milford Haven, but the three men aboard had landed safely at St Ann's Head.

Augusta remained in service until 1885, saving 23 lives.

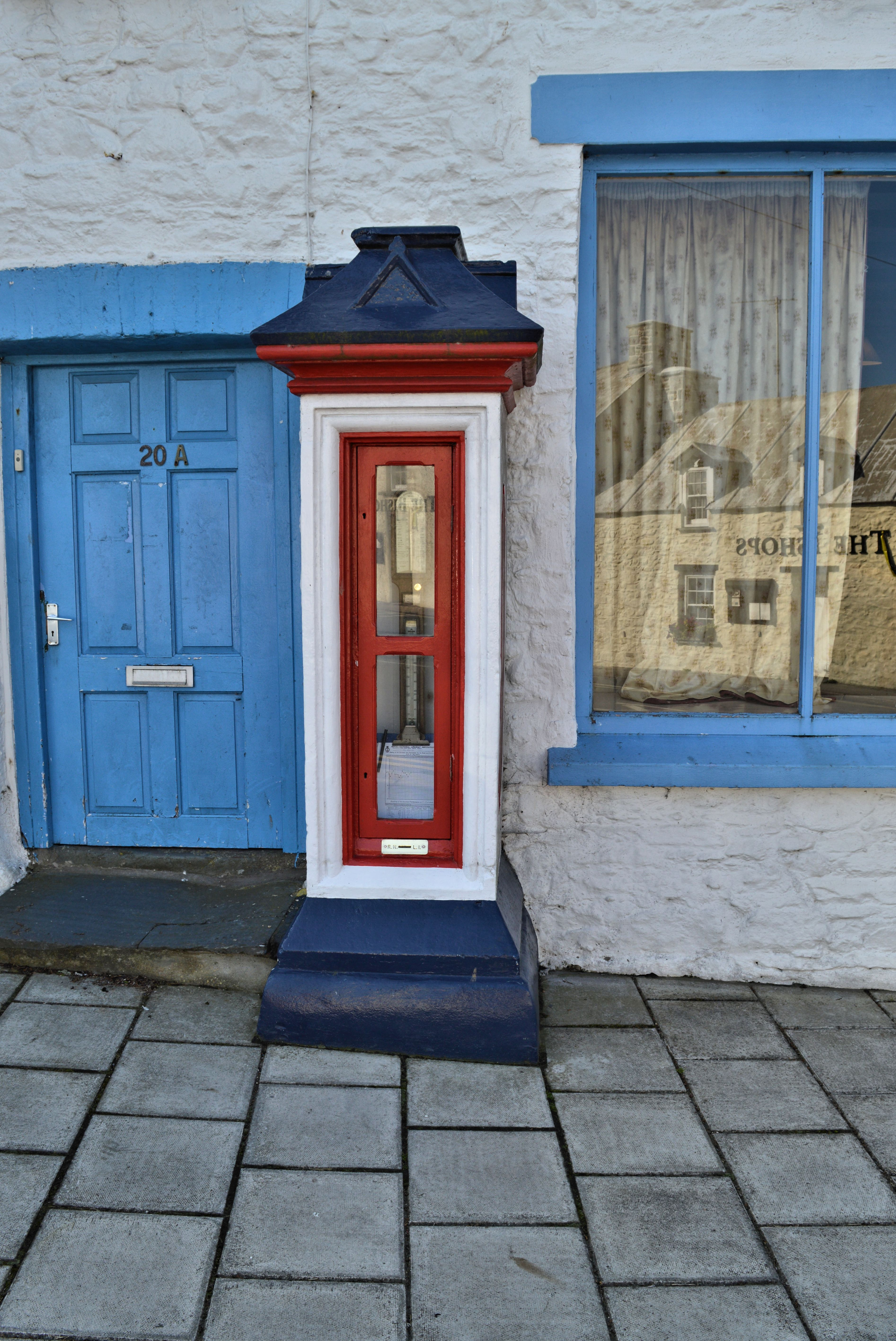
RNLI Barometer

In 1860, the RNLI decided to issue Barometers to lifeboat stations. The idea was simple; prevention was better than cure. If the local seafaring population could be advised that the weather was likely to turn, they would be less inclined to set sail, and therefore be less likely to need rescuing. There was no requirement for a barometer at St Justinian, but a barometer was issued to Solva in 1871, where there was a harbour. It is not known when the barometer was relocated, likely sometime after the Solva lifeboat station closed in 1887, but it now sits in a special cabinet, in the centre of St David's.

From 1885 to 1910, 16 lives were saved by the crew of the station's new lifeboat, Gem (ON 59). The lifeboat was wrecked on The Bitches reef during a rescue on 13 October 1910, and three crewmen drowned: Coxswain John Stephens, and lifeboatmen Henry Rowlands and James Price. Papers concerning the loss are held at Pembrokeshire Record Office (Ref:DX/93/11).

A temporary lifeboat, Charlotte (ON 46), was stationed at Porthclais for two years, whilst a new station and slipway were constructed to accommodate the station's first motor-powered lifeboat, General Farrell (ON 614), which arrived on station in 1912.

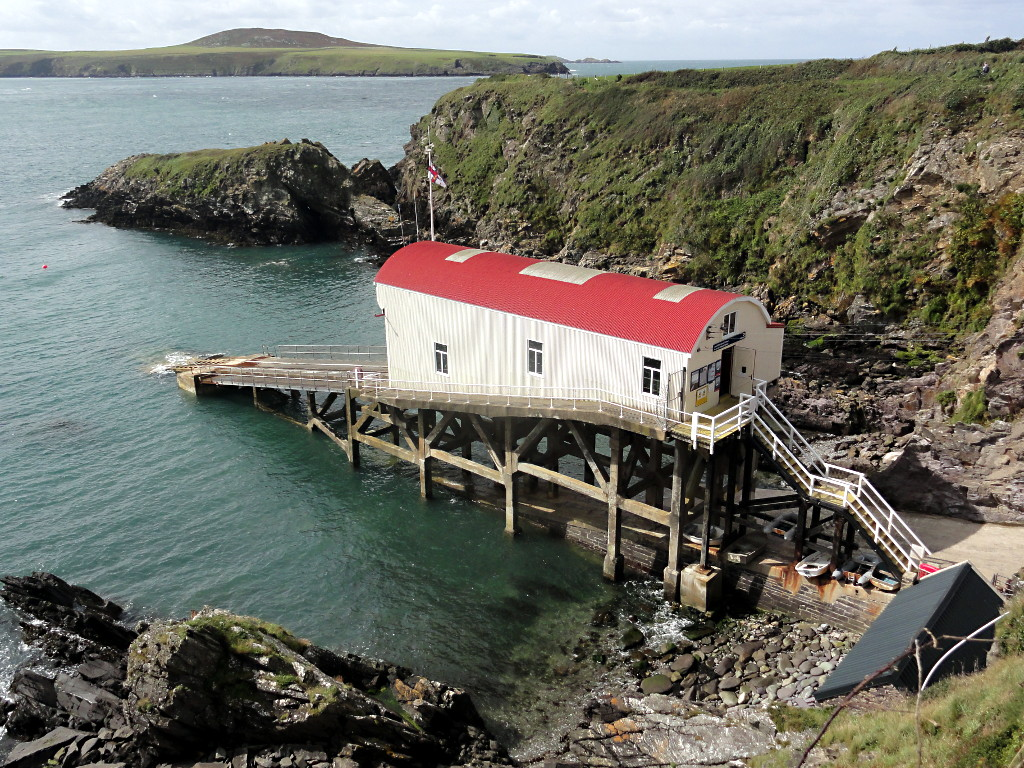
1912 Lifeboat House

General Farrell remained on station until 1936, her crew saving 17 lives in the intervening years. She was replaced by Civil Service No.6, later to be named Swn-y-Mor (Civil Service No.6), which saw one of the busiest periods in the station's history, her crews saving 108 lives in her 26 years of service, although marked by the loss of lifeboatman Ieuan Bateman in 1956. A couple of years earlier, on the 27 November 1954, the tanker World Concord broke in two in hurricane-force winds; a combined effort by the lifeboats from St Davids and Rosslare Harbour saw 42 people rescued from the tanker.

Swn-y-Mor had been donated by the Civil Service Lifeboat Fund, and the same organisation donated the next lifeboat, Joseph Soar (ON 971), in 1963. Already fitted with some innovative equipment, she was converted for self-righting in 1974, and during her tenure the crew saved 45 lives.

Joseph Soar had been named in honour of Dr. Joseph Soar, MBE, former footballer with Derby County F.C., organist at St Davids Cathedral, Honorary Secretary and crew member of St David's lifeboat, and holder of the RNLI Bronze Medal. The lifeboat was transferred to Dunbar in 1985, and sold by the RNLI in 1992, when she was given a civic send-off at Poole. Undergoing a complete 18-month refit in 2012–2013, the boat is still operating as a pleasure craft based in Northern Ireland. She is now almost exclusively used in promotion and fundraising for the RNLI, visits dozens of RNLI Stations each year.

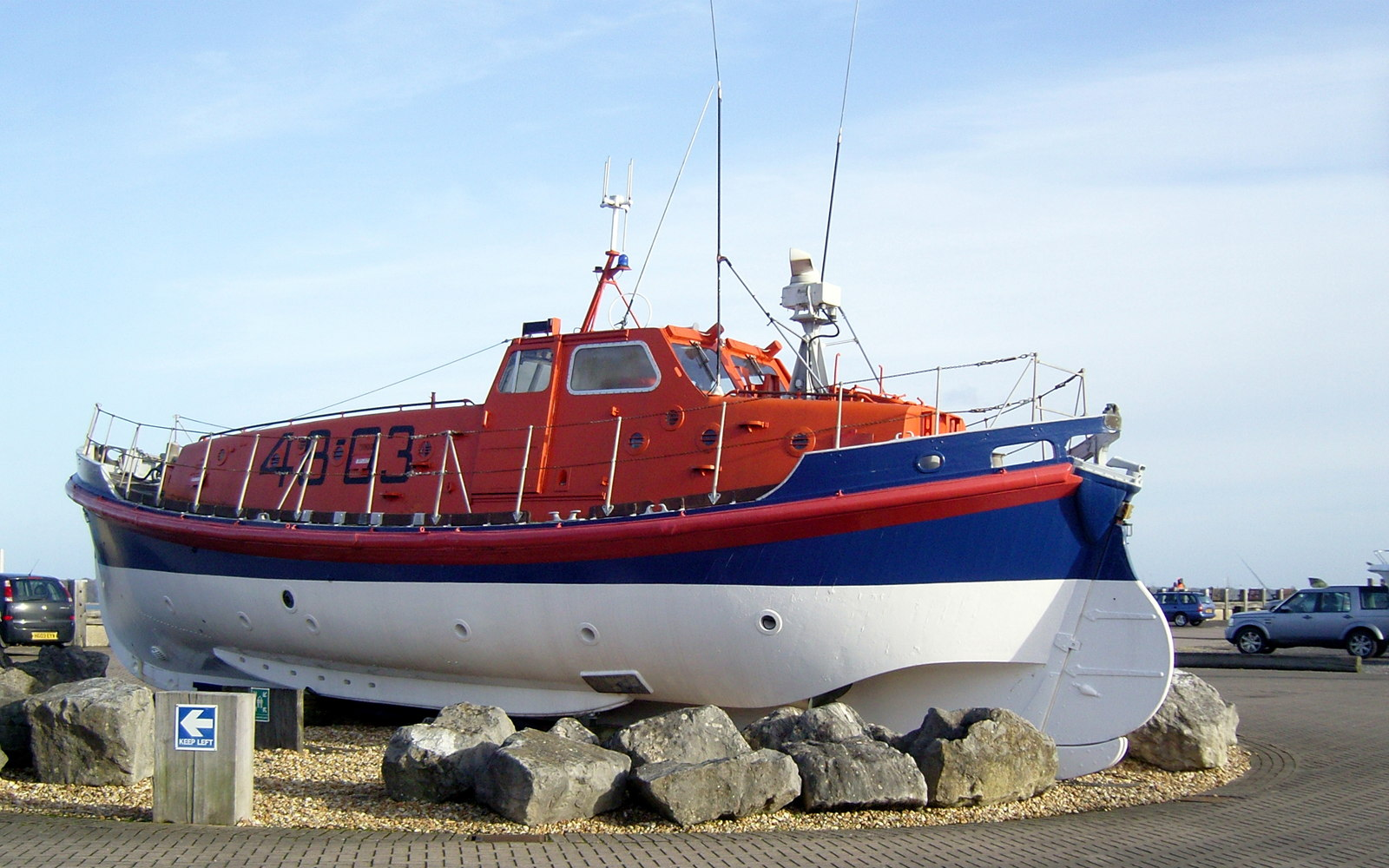
Oakley lifeboat Ruby and Arthur Reed (ON 990), on permanent display at Hythe Marina, Southampton

From 1985 to 1988, the station's All-weather lifeboat was Ruby and Arthur Reed (ON 990), formerly on station at Cromer, where she had already been involved in saving 58 lives. A further nine lives would be saved at St Davids. She was replaced by 47-026 Garside (ON 1139), a new Tyne-class lifeboat which, until superseded in 2013 by the Tamar-class lifeboat Norah Wortley, had been launched more than 160 times.

After the withdrawal of the RAF Rescue Service helicopter from nearby RAF Brawdy, St Davids trialed an Inshore lifeboat in 1997, and the following year took possession of a permanent addition to the station of a D-class ILB, Dewi Sant (D-543) (Saint David). This was replaced in 2008 by Myrtle & Trevor Gurr (D-704). The lifeboat station and slipways were modernised extensively in the 1990s. In April 2013, St. David's new Tamar-class lifeboat was placed on station, temporarily moored afloat, pending construction of the new boathouse and slipway. In certain weather conditions, the Tamar had to be removed to a safe anchorage and for this reason the Tyne class Garside remained on station in the 1912 boathouse, with St Davids in the unusual situation of operating two ALBs at the same time.

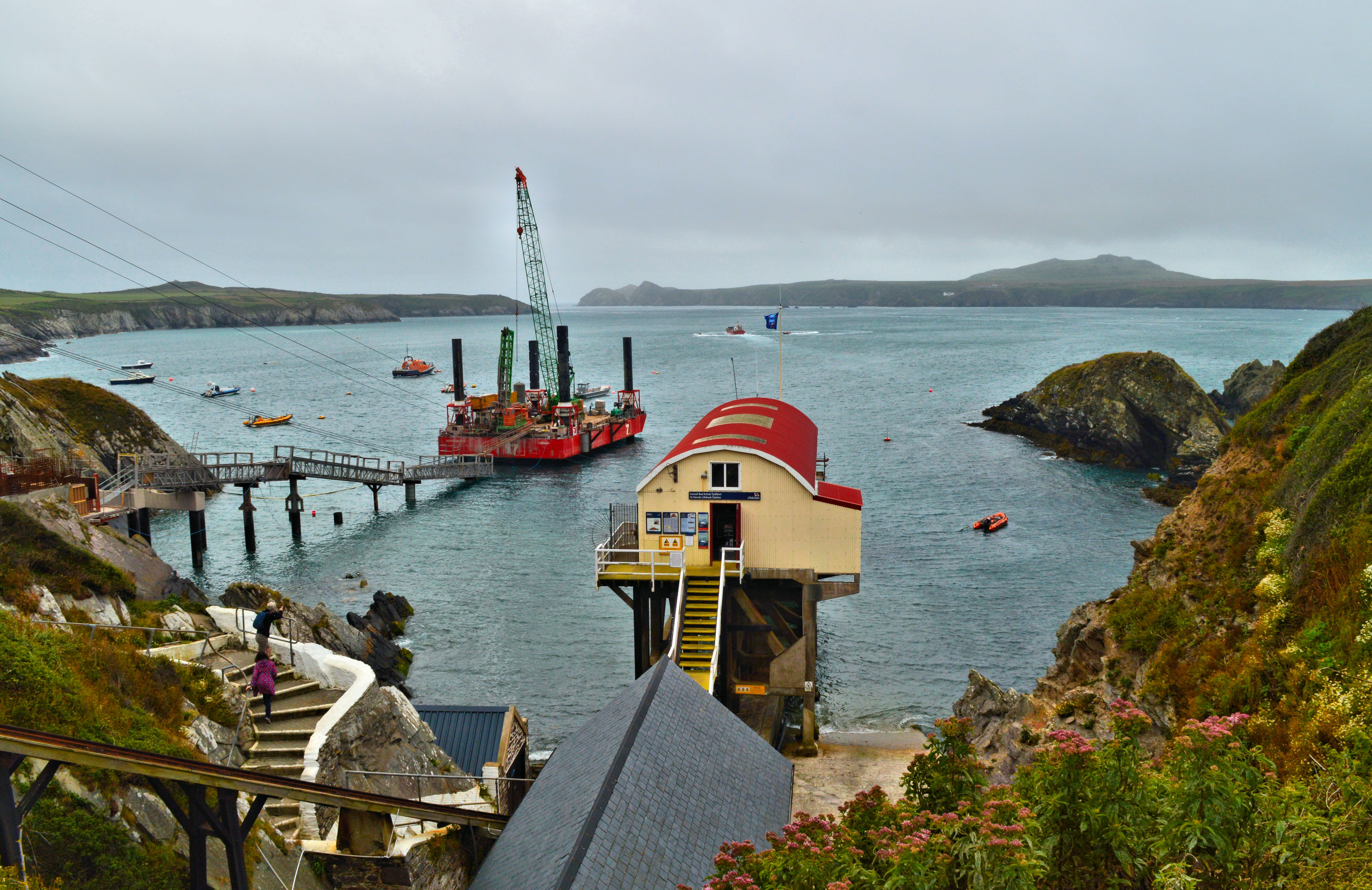
Construction of the new station

In 2014, construction started on a new larger lifeboat house and slipway capable of accommodating the Tamar, with improved access for bringing in equipment and evacuating casualties and more extensive modern facilities; the cost is in the region of £9.5 million. The new facility is a short distance from the existing boathouse which remained in service until the new boathouse was completed.

With completion of the new boathouse, Garside was launched down the slipway of the old boathouse for the last time on 21 October 2016, before heading back to the RNLI headquarters at Poole to join the relief fleet.

The new Tamar-class all-weather lifeboat, 16-26 Norah Wortley (ON 1306), was launched from the new station for the first time on 21 October 2016; her naming ceremony took place on 14 March 2017 on the occasion of the official opening of the new station.

== Today ==
The station employs two full-time members, Coxswain and Mechanic. The remaining crew, all volunteers, and who all live within about 3 miles (4.8 km) of the station, are contacted by pager when needed. Neighbouring lifeboat stations are Fishguard to the north, Little and Broad Haven to the south and Rosslare Harbour in Ireland to the west.

The lifeboat station is the embarkation point for ferries to Ramsey Island.

== Station honours ==
The following are awards made at St Davids:

- RNLI Silver Medal
  David Hicks, Coxswain – 1892
  William Narbett, Acting Coxswain – 1903
  Sidney Mortimer, fisherman – 1910
  William Watts Williams, Coxswain – 1955
- Silver Medal - first class, awarded by the French Government
  Ieuan M. Bateman, crew member – 1956 (posthumous)
- RNLI Bronze Medal
  Dr Joseph Soar, DMus, Honorary Secretary – 1943
  Gwillym Jenkin Davies, crew member – 1943
  William Watts Williams, Coxswain – 1943
  George G. Jordan, Motor Mechanic – 1955
  Gwillym Jenkin Davies, Assistant Mechanic – 1955
  David John Lewis, Coxswain – 1956
  William Thomas Morris, Coxswain – 1978
  Frederick George John, Coxswain – 1982
  David Chant, Coxswain/Mechanic – 1989
- Bronze Medal, of the French Lifeboat Society
  Ieuan M. Bateman, crew member – 1956 (posthumous)
- The Thanks of the Institution inscribed on Vellum
  David Lewis, Second Coxswain – 1955
  William Rowlands, Acting Bowman – 1955
  Howell H. Roberts, Emergency Mechanic – 1955
  William Morris, crew member – 1955
  Richard Chisholm, crew member – 1955
  Frederick John, Coxswain/Mechanic – 1985
  Frederick John, Coxswain/Mechanic – 1987
  Malcolm Gray, Coxswain – 1999
  Malcolm Gray MBE, Coxswain – 2005
  David John, Coxswain – 2008
- A Framed Letter of Thanks signed by the Chairman of the Institution
  Neil Thomas, Helm – 2005
  Clive Hayes, Second Coxswain – 2008
- A Collective Letter of Thanks signed by the Chairman of the Institution
  Nicholas Phillips, Helm – 2008
  Simon Thornton, Helm – 2008
  Simon Twitchen, crew member – 2008
  Gareth Morris, crew member – 2008
- Member, Order of the British Empire (MBE)
  Dr Joseph Soar, DMus, FRCO, ARCM – 1947NYH
  Malcolm Colborne Gray, Former Coxswain – 2005NYH

== Roll of honour ==
In memory of those lost whilst serving St Davids lifeboat:

- Lost from the lifeboat Gem (ON 59), wrecked on service, 13 October 1910.
  John Stephens, Coxswain (63)
  Henry Rowlands (51)
  James Price (48)
- Lost overboard from the lifeboat, on service to the French trawler Notre Dame de Fatima, 8 November 1956.
  Ieuan M. Bateman (21)

== St Davids lifeboats ==
=== Pulling and Sailing lifeboats ===
ON (Note: ON is the RNLI's Official Number of the boat.)	Name	Built	On station	Class	Comments
Pre-535	Augusta	1869	1869–1885	32-foot Prowse self-righting (P&S)	(Note: 32 ft 0 in (9.75 m) x 7 ft 6 in (2.29 m) (10-oared) Prowse-class self-righting (P&S) lifeboat, gift of The Earl of Dartmouth and tenantry, built by Forrestt of Limehouse, London, costing £247.); Sold in 1886.
59	Gem	1885	1885–1910	37-foot self-righting (P&S)	(Note: 37 ft 0 in (11.28 m) x 8 ft 0 in (2.44 m) (12-oared) self-righting (P&S) lifeboat, legacy of Mr J. Metcalfe of West Huntington Hall, York, built by Woolfe of Shadwell, London, costing £390.); Wrecked on 13 October 1910.
46	Reserve No. 6	1886	1910–1912	37-foot self-righting (P&S)	(Note: 37 ft 0 in (11.28 m) x 8 ft 0 in (2.44 m) (12-oared) self-righting (P&S) lifeboat, legacy of Miss A. F. Howie of Tulse Hill, London, built by Forrestt of Limehouse, London, costing £374.); Previously Charlotte at Porthoustock. Sold in 1912.

Pre ON numbers are unofficial numbers used by the Lifeboat Enthusiasts' Society to reference early lifeboats not included on the official RNLI list.

=== Motor lifeboats ===
ON	Op.No. (Note: Op. No. is the RNLI's Operational Number of the boat carried on the hull.)	Name	Built	On station	Class	Comments
614	–	General Farrell	1911	1912–1936	40-foot self-righting (Motor)	(Note: 40 ft 0 in (12.19 m) x 10 ft 6 in (3.20 m) self-righting (motor) lifeboat, with a single 40-hp Tylor engine, legacy of Miss A. F. Howie of Tulse Hill, London, built by Forrestt of Limehouse, London, costing £374.); Sold in 1936. Renamed Iona. Last reported at Great Yarmouth in 1983.
784	–	Civil Service No.6	1936	1936–1956	46-foot Watson	Renamed Swn-y-Mor (Civil Service No.6) in 1956.
784	–	Swn-y-Mor (Civil Service No.6)	1936	1956–1963	46-foot Watson	
971	–	Joseph Soar (Civil Service No.34)	1963	1963–1985	47-foot Watson	
990	48-03	Ruby and Arthur Reed	1966	1985–1988	Oakley	Previously at Cromer
1139	47-026	Garside	1988	1988–2013	Tyne	
1306	16-26	Norah Wortley	2013	2013–	Tamar	

More post-service details can be found on the respective lifeboat class pages.

=== St David's No. 2 ===
ON	Op.No.	Name	Built	On station	Class	Comments
1139	47-026	Garside	1988	2013–2016	Tyne	Retained as No. 2 lifeboat during construction of new station.

=== Inshore lifeboats ===
==== D class ====
Op. No.	Name	On station	Class	Comments
D-543	Dewi Sant	1998–2008	D-class (EA16)	
D-704	Myrtle & Trevor Gurr	2008–2019	D-class (IB1)	
D-840	Marian and Alan Clayton	2019–	D-class (IB1)	

== See also ==
- List of RNLI stations
- List of former RNLI stations
- Royal National Lifeboat Institution lifeboats
- List of Lifeboat Disasters in the British Isles
