= Bishops and Clerks =

Group of islets in Pembrokeshire, Wales

Coordinates: 51.87°N 5.395°W

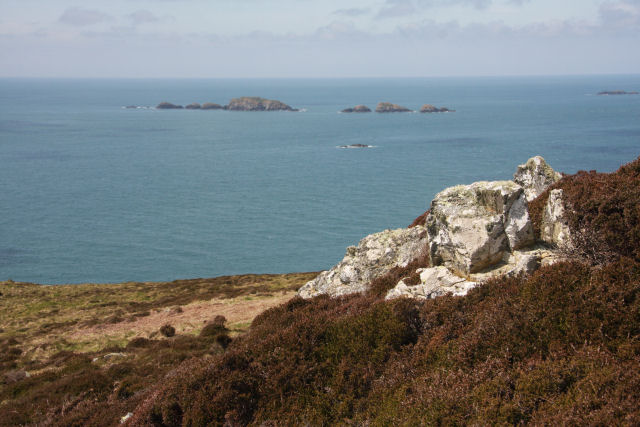
View northwest from Ramsey Island showing some of the islets around Carreg Rhoson

The Bishops and Clerks are a group of rocks and islets, approximately 1 1/2 miles (2.4 km) west of Ramsey Island, Pembrokeshire, Wales.

== Origins of the name ==
There was a local tradition that the name arose from the sixteenth century wreck of a fleet of merchant ships from which there were only three survivors: Miles Bishop, James Clerk and Henry Clerk. However, this derivation is now thought to be unlikely and that the name probably comes from there being a larger island surrounded by smaller islands. Similar names are used for islands in the Isles of Scilly and for the Bishop and Clerk Islets in the southwestern Pacific Ocean.

The islands are named as the Bisshoppis and his clerkis in the manuscript Sailing Directions for the Circumnavigation of England which dates from the middle fifteenth century or earlier. They are named The bisshop and his clarkes in a 1578 map of Pembrokeshire by Christopher Saxton.

An ecclesiastical link is supported by the Pembrokeshire antiquarian George Owen:

A seeboard this Iland Ramsey rangeth in order the Bushop and his clearkes being vij^{en} in Nomber, all wayes seene at lowe water who are not w^{th}out some small Quiristers, who shewe not themselves, but at spring tydes, and calm seas,

The chiefest of theis ys called by the inhabitantes the Bushops rocke one other Carreg y rossan, the third Divighe, the 4^{th} emskir, the rest as yet I haue not learned their names if they have anye... The Bushop and those clerkes preach deadly doctrine to their winter audience...

— George Owen of Henllys, The Description of Penbrokeshire (1594)

== Geography ==
There are four distinct groups of islets. From the north these are:

- North Bishop (44 metres, 144 feet)
- Carreg Rhoson (44 metres, 144 feet)
- Carreg Rhoson E Island (30 metres, 98 feet)
  - Maen Rhoson
- Daufraich
  - Maen Daufraich
  - Moelyn
  - Cribog
- Emsger or South Bishop (37 metres, 121 feet)

In addition, the three small wave-washed rocks of Carreg-trai, Llechau-isaf and Llechau-uchaf sit in the waters between the Bishops and Clerks and Ramsey Island and the Welsh mainland.

== Lighthouse ==
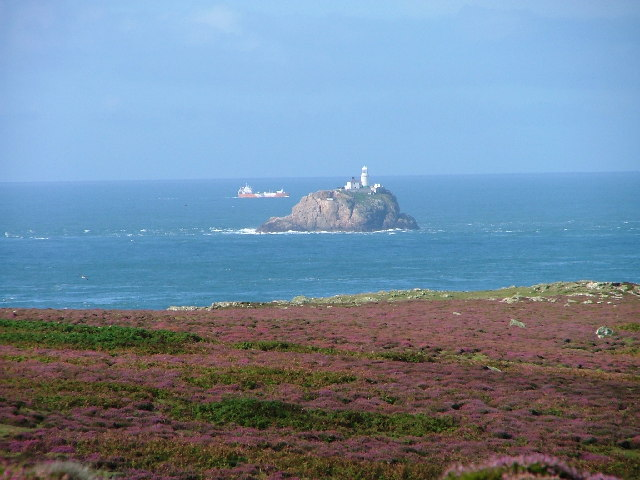
South Bishop Lighthouse on Emsger photographed from Ramsey Island

The islands and their neighbouring rocks are dangerous to shipping, and about thirteen shipwrecks are recorded in the waters immediately surrounding the islands, notably North Bishop. The South Bishop Lighthouse was built on Emsger (South Bishop) in 1839.

== Geology ==
The two northerly islet groups are formed from gabbro, a hard-wearing rock of igneous origin whilst those of the Daufraich group to their south (and indeed Llechau-isaf) are formed from microtonalite, another intrusive igneous rock. The most southerly, Emsger is formed from rhyolite. All these are of probable lower Palaeozoic origin. Llechau-uchaf is formed from the late Cambrian 'Lingula Flags' whilst Carreg-trai is formed from Ordovician acid tuffs of the Llanrian Volcanic Formation. The submarine geology between the main groups is formed by sandstones and mudstones of Cambro-Ordovician age, though the bedrock is partly covered by sand and gravel.
