= 2022 Swansea Council election =

2022 Welsh city and county of Swansea council election

- All 75 seats in Swansea Council; 38 seats needed for a majority
- Turnout: 36%
Party	Vote %	Seats	+/–
Labour	55%	45	−3
Liberal Democrats	14%	11	+4
Conservative	12%	7	−1
Independents	5%	5	+3
Uplands	4%	4	+2
Independents@Swansea	1%	2	−1
Greens	3%	1	+1
Plaid Cymru	4%	0	0
This lists parties that won seats. See the complete results below.
Map of the results of the 2022 Swansea Council election
Leader of the council before	Leader of the council after
Rob Stewart; Labour	Rob Stewart; Labour

The 2022 election to Swansea Council took place on 5 May 2022 as part of the 2022 Welsh local elections. Seventy five seats were up for election across 32 wards. The previous full election took place in 2017.

== Background ==
=== Ward changes ===
As the result of a ward boundary review, the number of wards were reduced from 36 to 32, but with the number of councillors increasing from 72 to 75, effective from the 2022 election. The changes were designed to make the ratio between councillors and voters more equal.

Fifteen ward boundaries would be unaffected though a significant number of wards were merged or amended. The Mawr ward ceased to exist, its communities divided amongst neighbouring wards and a new ward of Pontlliw and Tircoed created. A Mumbles ward was created by merging the Newton and Oystermouth wards. A Llwchwr ward was created by merging Kingsbridge, Lower Loughor and Upper Loughor. A new Waterfront ward was created from parts of the Castle ward and St Thomas ward. A new Waunarlwydd ward was created from part of Cockett. Dunvant, Killay North and Killay South were merged to create a Dunvant and Killay ward. The Gorseinon and Penyrheol wards were combined to become Gorseinon and Penyrheol.

== Results ==
Results
Party	Seats	Change
Labour Party	45	▼3
Liberal Democrats	11	▲4
Conservative Party	7	▼1
Independents	5	▲3
Uplands Party	4	▲2
Green Party	1	▲1

Seventy five seats were up for election and the Labour Party held onto power, despite losing three seats overall. The Labour council leader, Rob Stewart, partly blamed the recent ward boundary changes for their losses. In the Clydach ward, the Conservatives won a seat by eight votes, after two recounts. The Liberal Democrats gained four seats overall, while the council also gained its first ever Green Party councillor, in Mayals. The Uplands Party won an additional two seats off Labour in the Uplands ward, despite a candidate suffering a heart attack while out campaigning.

== Ward results ==
The following results were announced following the elections.

=== Bishopston (one seat) ===
Bishopston 2022
Party	Candidate	Votes	%	±%
Conservative	Lyndon Jones*	903	62.1	
Labour	Clare-Anna Mitchell	432	29.7	
Green	Karen Laurence	63	4.3	
Liberal Democrats	Howard Evans	56	3.9	
Turnout		1,454	52.6	–4.2
Conservative hold		Swing		

=== Bon-y-maen (two seats) ===
Bon-y-maen 2022
Party	Candidate	Votes	%	±%
Labour	Paul Lloyd*	1,072	78.2	
Labour	Mandy Evans*	1,056	77.0	
Independent	Richard Mylan	193	14.1	
Conservative	Miles Thomas	128	9.3	
Conservative	Jayne Isaac	106	7.7	
Turnout		1,371	24.6	–4.3
Labour hold		Swing		
Labour hold		Swing		

=== Castle (four seats) ===
Castle 2022
Party	Candidate	Votes	%	±%
Labour	Fiona Gordon*	1,613	68.0	
Labour	Hannah Lawson*	1,564	65.9	
Labour	Patience Bentu	1,533	64.6	
Labour	David Phillips*	1,475	62.2	
Plaid Cymru	Patrick Powell	452	19.0	
Green	John Pitans	376	15.8	
Independent	Heather Burdett	301	12.7	
Conservative	Elaine Hughes	290	12.2	
Conservative	Sonya Morris	267	11.3	
Liberal Democrats	Ben Williams	246	10.4	
TUSC	Gareth Bromhall	117	4.9	
Freedom Alliance	Katon Bouzalakos	110	4.6	
TUSC	Owen Lees	110	4.6	
Turnout		2,373	25.6	–4.2
Labour hold		Swing		
Labour hold		Swing		
Labour hold		Swing		
Labour hold		Swing		

Hannah Lawson had been councillor for the ward, since replacing the late Sybil Crouch at a 2021 by-election.

=== Clydach (three seats) ===
Clydach 2022
Party	Candidate	Votes	%	±%
Independent	Gordon Walker*	2,025	68.8	
Independent	Matthew Bailey	1,844	62.6	
Conservative	Brigitte Rowlands**	1,003	34.1	
Labour	Susan Powell	995	33.8	
Labour	Wez Morgan	951	32.3	
Labour	Dylan Williams	823	28.0	
Turnout		2,944	43.4	+15.0
Independent hold		Swing		
Independent gain from Labour		Swing		
Conservative win (new seat)				

Brigitte Rowlands was the councillor for the Mawr ward, which was partly incorporated into Clydach in 2022.

=== Cockett (three seats) ===
Cockett 2022
Party	Candidate	Votes	%	±%
Labour	Mike Durke*	1,414	63.7	
Labour	Oliver James*	1,378	62.0	
Labour	Elliott King*	1,310	59.0	
Green	Marie Greaves	408	18.4	
Liberal Democrats	Vivienne Samuel	395	17.8	
Conservative	Steve Norman	394	17.7	
Liberal Democrats	Rhian Russell	318	14.3	
Freedom Alliance	Kim Brooker	167	7.5	
Turnout		2,221	27.7	–5.0
Labour hold		Swing		
Labour hold		Swing		
Labour hold		Swing		

=== Cwmbwrla (three seats) ===
Cwmbwrla 2022
Party	Candidate	Votes	%	±%
Liberal Democrats	Peter Black*	1,455	74.6	
Liberal Democrats	Christopher Holley*	1,160	59.5	
Liberal Democrats	Graham Thomas*	1,136	58.2	
Labour	Margaret Greenaway	537	27.5	
Labour	Malcom Harrington	488	25.0	
Labour	Ian Isaac	431	22.1	
Green	Rhiannon Wall	106	5.4	
Conservative	Chris Griffiths	82	4.2	
Freedom Alliance	Ilona Gofmaniene	38	1.9	
Turnout		1,951	34.1	–4.1
Liberal Democrats hold		Swing		
Liberal Democrats hold		Swing		
Liberal Democrats hold		Swing		

=== Dunvant and Killay (three seats) ===
Dunvant and Killay 2022
Party	Candidate	Votes	%	±%
Liberal Democrats	Mary Jones**	1,442	41.9	
Liberal Democrats	Jeff Jones**	1,391	40.4	
Labour	Louise Gibbard**	1,335	38.8	
Labour	Mark Davies	1,319	38.3	
Labour	José Cifuentes	1,288	37.4	
Liberal Democrats	Beth Rowe	1,248	36.3	
Green	Jim Robinson	361	10.5	
Conservative	David Jeffreys	357	10.4	
Conservative	Jonathan Jones	340	9.9	
Conservative	Ross Lock	302	8.8	
Plaid Cymru	Rhiannon Barrar	278	8.1	
Plaid Cymru	Margot Morgan	177	5.1	
Plaid Cymru	Sharon-Rose Taylor	151	4.4	
Turnout		3,440	46.1	+4.1
Liberal Democrats win (new seat)				
Liberal Democrats win (new seat)				
Labour win (new seat)				

Ward formed by the merger of Dunvant, Killay North and Killay South wards. Gibbard was a sitting councillor for Dunvant, while Mary Jones and Jeff Jones were the sitting councillors in Killay North and Killay South respectively.

=== Fairwood (one seat) ===
Fairwood 2022
Party	Candidate	Votes	%	±%
Conservative	Paxton Hood‐Williams*	434	40.6	
Labour	Jane Harris	341	31.9	
Plaid Cymru	Matthew Ward	194	18.1	
Liberal Democrats	Philip Ebden	101	9.4	
Turnout		1074	47.1	–5.7
Conservative hold		Swing		

=== Gorseinon and Penyrheol (three seats) ===
Gorseinon and Penyrheol 2022
Party	Candidate	Votes	%	±%
Labour	Andrew Stevens**	2,073	74.6	
Labour	Jan Curtice**	2,018	72.7	
Labour	Nicola Matthews	1,800	64.8	
Conservative	Brett Roberts	511	18.4	
Green	Anthony James	453	16.3	
Liberal Democrats	Anthony Foligno	317	11.4	
Turnout		2,777	35.1	
Labour win (new seat)				
Labour win (new seat)				
Labour win (new seat)				

Curtice and Stevens won the two seats in the Penyrheol ward at the previous 2017 election. Labour won the Gorseinon seat at the same election.

=== Gower (one seat) ===
Gower 2022
Party	Candidate	Votes	%	±%
Conservative	Richard Lewis*	719	56.2	
Labour	Cynthia Phillips	334	26.1	
Green	Steven Davies	123	9.6	
Liberal Democrats	Patrick Furlong	103	8.1	
Turnout		1,289	50.0	–1.9
Conservative gain from Independent		Swing		

Sitting member Richard Lewis had been elected as an independent at the previous 2017 election.

=== Gowerton (two seats) ===
Gowerton 2022
Party	Candidate	Votes	%	±%
Independent	Susan Jones*	1,044	61.2	
Labour	Dai Jenkins	624	36.6	
Labour	Wilf Smith	407	23.8	
Liberal Democrats	Matthew Palmer	391	22.9	
Conservative	Alex Williams	380	22.3	
Plaid Cymru	Brian Edy	244	14.3	
Turnout		1,707	42.6	+13.8
Independent hold		Swing		
Labour win (new seat)				

=== Landore (two seats) ===
Landore 2022
Party	Candidate	Votes	%	±%
Labour	Beverley Hopkins*	1,044	79.1	
Labour	Mike White*	1,026	77.7	
Liberal Democrats	Helen Thomas	170	12.9	
Conservative	Owain Thomas	146	11.1	
Turnout		1320	26.7	–1.8
Labour hold		Swing		
Labour hold		Swing		

=== Llangyfelach (one seat) ===
Llangyfelach 2022
Party	Candidate	Votes	%	±%
Independent	Mark Tribe	750	65.9	
Labour	Robert Marshall	259	22.8	
Conservative	Euan Renesto	78	6.9	
Plaid Cymru	Adrian Roberts	51	4.5	
Turnout		1,138	50.2	+11.5
Independent hold		Swing		

=== Llansamlet (four seats) ===
Llansamlet 2022
Party	Candidate	Votes	%	±%
Labour	Ryland Doyle*	2,233	70.5	
Labour	Penny Matthews*	2,110	66.6	
Labour	Matthew Jones	1,924	60.8	
Labour	Alyson Pugh*	1,862	58.8	
Plaid Cymru	Trystan Gjertson	828	26.1	
Conservative	Jason Thomas	541	17.1	
Liberal Democrats	Derek Russell	436	13.8	
Turnout		3,167	27.8	–3.2
Labour hold		Swing		
Labour hold		Swing		
Labour hold		Swing		
Labour hold		Swing		

=== Llwchwr (three seats) ===
Llwchwr 2022
Party	Candidate	Votes	%	±%
Labour	Kelly Roberts	1,884	61.3	
Labour	Robert Smith**	1,790	58.2	
Labour	Adam Davis	1,741	56.6	
Plaid Cymru	Jason Lovell	597	19.4	
Plaid Cymru	Kieran Pritchard	505	16.4	
Conservative	Raymond Hinds	503	16.4	
Conservative	Barbara Jones	503	16.4	
Plaid Cymru	James Edy	393	12.8	
Gwlad	Wayne Erasmus	121	3.9	
TUSC	John Evans	78	2.5	
Turnout		3075	40.0	N/A
Labour win (new seat)				
Labour win (new seat)				
Labour win (new seat)				

Robert Smith was the councillor for the former ward of Upper Loughor.

=== Mayals (one seat) ===
Mayals 2022
Party	Candidate	Votes	%	±%
Green	Chris Evans	457	40.4	
Conservative	Louise Thomas	332	29.4	
Labour	Pam Erasmus	280	24.8	
Liberal Democrats	Daniel Guttery	62	5.5	
Turnout		1,138	51.4	–0.9
Green gain from Conservative		Swing		

=== Morriston (five seats) ===
Morriston 2022
Party	Candidate	Votes	%	±%
Labour	Ceri Evans*	2,741	74.6	
Labour	Rob Stewart*	2,665	72.6	
Labour	Robert Francis-Davies*	2,487	67.7	
Labour	Andrea Lewis*	2,471	67.2	
Labour	Yvonne Jardine*	2,366	64.3	
Conservative	Jake Harry	670	18.2	
Conservative	Ian Scott	668	18.2	
Independent	Gail John	546	14.9	
Liberal Democrats	Gareth Healey	538	14.6	
Turnout		3,676	29.6	–4.8
Labour hold		Swing		
Labour hold		Swing		
Labour hold		Swing		
Labour hold		Swing		
Labour hold		Swing		

=== Mumbles (three seats) ===
Mumbles 2022
Party	Candidate	Votes	%	±%
Conservative	Will Thomas**	1,760	51.9	
Conservative	Francesca O'Brien	1,510	44.5	
Conservative	Angela O'Connor	1,478	43.6	
Labour	Carrie Townsend Jones	1,234	36.4	
Labour	Martin O'Neill	1,156	34.1	
Labour	Richard Jarvis	1,155	34.0	
Green	Will Beasley	563	16.6	
Plaid Cymru	Patricia Sanderson	366	10.8	
Liberal Democrats	Allan Williams	273	8.0	
Turnout		3,393	50.4	N/A
Conservative win (new seat)				
Conservative win (new seat)				
Conservative win (new seat)				

Will Thomas was councillor for the former Newton ward prior to the election.

=== Mynydd-bach (three seats) ===
Mynydd-bach 2022
Party	Candidate	Votes	%	±%
Labour	Mike Lewis*	1,485	72.0	
Labour	Jess Pritchard	1,389	67.3	
Labour	Sam Pritchard*	1,313	63.6	
Conservative	Paul Morris	457	22.2	
Liberal Democrats	Ann Jamaluddin	352	17.1	
Turnout		2,063	31.0	–2.5
Labour hold		Swing		
Labour hold		Swing		
Labour hold		Swing		

=== Pen-clawdd (one seat) ===
Pen-clawdd 2022
Party	Candidate	Votes	%	±%
Labour	Andrew Williams	903	60.8	
Plaid Cymru	John Davies	337	22.7	
Conservative	Alex Lewis	152	10.2	
Liberal Democrats	Mike Sheehan	92	6.2	
Turnout		1,488	50.1	+6.0
Labour hold		Swing		

=== Penderry (three seats) ===
Penderry 2022
Party	Candidate	Votes	%	±%
Labour	Hazel Morris*	1,022	74.1	
Labour	Terry Hennegan*	1,019	73.9	
Labour	Erika Kirchner	967	70.1	
Conservative	Jasmine Rowlands-Lean	269	19.5	
Turnout		1,379	17.8	–3.9
Labour hold		Swing		
Labour hold		Swing		
Labour hold		Swing		

=== Penllergaer (one seat) ===
Penllergaer 2022
Party	Candidate	Votes	%	±%
Independent	Wendy Fitzgerald*	971	87.8	
Labour	Anthony Phillips	135	12.2	
Turnout		1,110	41.3	–6.4
Independent hold		Swing		

=== Pennard (one seat) ===
Pennard 2022
Party	Candidate	Votes	%	±%
Independent	Lynda James*	647	50.2	
Conservative	Ben Walker	334	25.9	
Labour	Cari Jones	309	24.0	
Turnout		1,293	47.6	–11.4
Independent hold		Swing		

=== Pontarddulais (two seats) ===
Pontarddulais 2022
Party	Candidate	Votes	%	±%
Independent	Kevin Griffiths*	1,217	56.4	
Labour	Philip Downing*	886	41.1	
Labour	Catherine Evans	808	37.5	
Independent	Roddy John	749	34.7	
Plaid Cymru	Jamie Johnstone	409	19.0	
Turnout		2,156	40.7	+15.1
Independent hold		Swing		
Labour hold		Swing		

=== Pontlliw and Tircoed (one seat) ===
Pontlliw and Tircoed 2022
Party	Candidate	Votes	%	±%
Labour	Victoria Holland	450	51.5	
Independent	Byron Lewis	424	48.5	
Turnout		880	41.6	N/A
Labour win (new seat)				

=== St Thomas (two seats) ===
St Thomas 2022
Party	Candidate	Votes	%	±%
Labour	Hayley Gwilliam	1,043	79.3	
Labour	Joe Hale*	1,013	77.0	
Conservative	Elizabeth Grace Thomas	253	19.2	
Liberal Democrats	Robert Hall	172	13.1	
Conservative	Jack Dean	158	12.0	
Freedom Alliance	Getrude Papaleni Shilongo	58	4.4	
Turnout		1,316	26.8	–3.5
Labour hold		Swing		
Labour hold		Swing		

=== Sketty (five seats) ===
Sketty 2022
Party	Candidate	Votes	%	±%
Liberal Democrats	Michael Day*	2,509	48.2	
Liberal Democrats	Cheryl Philpott*	2,358	45.3	
Liberal Democrats	Nicola Furlong	2,102	40.4	
Liberal Democrats	Michael Locke	2,028	38.9	
Liberal Democrats	James McGettrick	2,009	38.6	
Labour	Mahaboob Basha	1,987	38.2	
Labour	Sam Dredge	1,684	32.3	
Labour	Greg James	1,657	31.8	
Labour	Natalie Hussey	1,649	31.7	
Labour	Philip Thompson	1,433	27.5	
Conservative	Stephen Gallagher*	765	14.7	
Conservative	David Helliwell*	740	14.2	
Green	Nigel Bartolotti Hill	724	13.9	
Conservative	Stacey Norman	666	12.8	
Conservative	Jacob Derluk	647	12.4	
Conservative	Rebecca Singh	595	11.4	
Plaid Cymru	Dave Lewis	523	10.0	
Plaid Cymru	Sian Thomas	498	9.6	
Freedom Alliance	Simon Stern	76	1.5	
Turnout		5,208	46.6	+2.0
Liberal Democrats hold		Swing		
Liberal Democrats hold		Swing		
Liberal Democrats gain from Labour		Swing		
Liberal Democrats gain from Conservative		Swing		
Liberal Democrats gain from Conservative		Swing		

=== Townhill (three seats) ===
Townhill 2022
Party	Candidate	Votes	%	±%
Labour	Cyril Anderson*	955	76.0	
Labour	Lesley Walton*	903	71.8	
Labour	David Hopkins*	900	71.6	
Green	Steven Clegg	171	13.6	
Liberal Democrats	Cameron Shippam	139	11.1	
Conservative	Rob Thomas	118	9.4	
Freedom Alliance	Jacquelyn Haley	103	8.2	
Independent	Marguerite Tcheko	81	6.4	
Turnout		1,257	21.2	–4.2
Labour hold		Swing		
Labour hold		Swing		
Labour hold		Swing		

=== Uplands (four seats) ===
Uplands 2022
Party	Candidate	Votes	%	±%
Uplands	Peter May*	1,978	60.1	
Uplands	Sandra Joy	1,787	54.3	
Uplands	Stuart Rice	1,663	50.5	
Uplands	Allan Jeffery	1,641	49.8	
Labour	Rebecca Francis-Davies	1,279	38.8	
Labour	Libby Nolan	1,112	33.8	
Labour	Robyn Parker	1,038	31.5	
Labour	Ceri Powe	1,004	30.5	
Plaid Cymru	Adonis El-Salloukh	331	10.1	
Liberal Democrats	Chloe Hutchinson	178	5.4	
Liberal Democrats	Michael O'Carroll	153	4.6	
Liberal Democrats	Trudi Hancock	140	4.3	
Liberal Democrats	Benjamin Falkner	130	3.9	
Freedom Alliance	Michelle Valerio	95	2.9	
TUSC	Evan Vaughan	70	2.1	
TUSC	Oisin Mulhulland	69	2.1	
TUSC	Charlie Wells	61	1.9	
Turnout		3,293	31.8	–6.0
Uplands hold		Swing		
Uplands hold		Swing		
Uplands gain from Labour		Swing		
Uplands gain from Labour		Swing		

=== Waterfront (one seat) ===
Waterfront 2022
Party	Candidate	Votes	%	±%
Liberal Democrats	Sam Bennett	590	60.5	
Labour	Adam Gilbert	309	31.7	
Conservative	Austin Elias	77	7.9	
Turnout		981	36.8	N/A
Liberal Democrats win (new seat)				

=== Waunarlwydd (one seat) ===
Waunarlwydd 2022
Party	Candidate	Votes	%	±%
Labour	Wendy Lewis**	694	68.2	
Green	Stan Gurung	221	21.7	
Conservative	Matthew Gates	77	7.6	
Liberal Democrats	Edmund Sides	25	2.5	
Turnout		1,019	38.9	N/A
Labour win (new seat)				

Wendy Lewis was formerly a councillor for the Cockett ward, which until this election included Waunarlwydd.

=== West Cross (two seats) ===
West Cross 2022
Party	Candidate	Votes	%	±%
Labour	Rebecca Fogarty	1,241	57.0	
Labour	Sara Keeton	1,152	52.9	
Conservative	Emilie Cox	719	33.0	
Conservative	Thomas Beynon	692	31.8	
Green	Anna Pigott	258	11.8	
Turnout		2,178	46.5	+13.9
Labour hold		Swing		
Labour hold		Swing		

*' = sitting councillor in same ward prior to election **' = sitting councillor in a related former ward prior to election

== Changes ==
=== Penderry ===
April 27, 2023 Penderry by-election
Party	Candidate	Votes	%	±%
Labour	Mair Baker	485	53.4	−20.7
Liberal Democrats	Dan Burton	274	30.1	N/A
Conservative	Jake Harry	74	8.1	−11.4
Green	Craig Davies	42	4.6	N/A
Plaid Cymru	Ioan Macsen Gruffydd-Warlow	34	3.7	N/A
Turnout				
Labour hold		Swing		

=== Penllergaer ===
March 27, 2025 Penllergaer By-Election
Party	Candidate	Votes	%	±%
Independents @ Swansea	Anthony Fitzgerald	646	63.9	N/A
Liberal Democrats	Howard Evans	138	13.6	N/A
Reform	Gareth Turner	108	10.7	N/A
Labour	Marsha Claire Phillips	67	6.6	−5.6
Conservative	Jake Lloyd Thomas Harris	31	3.1	N/A
Green	William Dominic Beasley	18	1.8	N/A
Gwlad	Wayne Erasmus	3	0.3	N/A
Turnout				
Independents @ Swansea hold		Swing		

Elections took place due to death of incumbent councillor, Wendy Fitzgerald.

=== Fairwood ===
May 28, 2026 Fairwood By-Election
Party	Candidate	Votes	%	±%
Liberal Democrats	Beth Rowe	240	29.3%	+19.9
Labour	Nigel Evans	185	22.6%	−9.3
Reform	Stephen Taylor	139	17.0%	N/A
Independent	Dennis Paul	94	11.5	N/A
Conservative	David William Helliwell	84	10.3	−30.3
Independent	Matthew Alan Ward	77	9.4	N/A
Turnout		819		
Liberal Democrats gain from Conservative		Swing	+25.1	

=== Mumbles ===
June 18, 2026 Mumbles By-Election
Party	Candidate	Votes	%	±%
Conservative	Hannah Williams	933	37.3%	−4.7
Labour	David Lewis	460	18.4%	−11.0
Reform	Emilie Cox	458	18.3%	N/A
Plaid Cymru	Tricia Sanderson	268	4.7%	N/A
Green	Rich Williams	200	8.0%	−5.4
Liberal Democrats	Jim Hehir	66	2.6%	−3.9
Turnout		2503	18.9%	N/A
Conservative gain from Reform		Swing	+25.1	

=== Morriston ===
June 18, 2026 Morriston By-Election
Party	Candidate	Votes	%	±%
Labour	Rebecca Francis-Davies	908	35.2%	−25.8
Reform	Graham Ashby	822	N/A	−11.0
Plaid Cymru	Ioan Marc Warlow	569	21.9%	N/A
Green	Gareth Paul Schofield	107	4.1%	N/A
Liberal Democrats	Lewis Hayden	93	4.7%	−8.4
Conservative	Idin Ghotby	87	3.4%	−11.5
Turnout		2586		N/A
Labour hold		Swing		
