= 2004 City and County of Swansea Council election =

2004 Welsh local government election

Results of the 2004 City and County of Swansea Council election

The third election to the City and County of Swansea Council was held in May 2004. It was preceded by the 1999 election and followed by the 2008 election.

== Overview ==
All council seats were up for election. These were the third elections held following local government reorganisation and the abolition of West Glamorgan County Council. The Labour Party lost their majority on the authority.

== Candidates ==
The contests were fought by most of the main parties but Labour was the only one to contest the majority of seats.

== Overall result ==
City and County of Swansea Council election result 2004
Party	Seats	Gains	Losses	Net gain/loss	Seats %	Votes %	Votes	+/−
Labour	32							
Liberal Democrats	19							
Independent	12							
Plaid Cymru	5							
Conservative	4							
Green	0							

== Results by ward ==
* = sitting councillor in this ward prior to election

=== Bishopston (one seat) ===
Bishopston 2004
Party	Candidate	Votes	%	±%
Independent	Keith Edmund Marsh*	1,029		
Liberal Democrats	John Philip Bleay	168		
Green	Larch Ian Albert Frank Juckes Maxey	143		
Independent hold		Swing		

=== Bonymaen (two seats) ===
Bonymaen 2004
Party	Candidate	Votes	%	±%
Independent	John Brian Hague*	1093		
Labour	Mair Eluned Gibbs*	936		
Plaid Cymru	Philip Charles Couch	386		
Liberal Democrats	Vivienne Anne Samuel	224		
Independent hold		Swing		
Labour hold		Swing		

=== Castle (four seats) ===
Castle 2004
Party	Candidate	Votes	%	±%
Labour	Robert Alan Lloyd*	1,034		
Labour	Barbara Joyce Hynes*	943		
Labour	Erika Kirchner	897		
Labour	David Phillips*	876		
Plaid Cymru	Patrick John Powell	671		
Plaid Cymru	Hugh Nigel Parsons	656		
Liberal Democrats	Daniel John Davies	649		
Plaid Cymru	Farid Ali	644		
Liberal Democrats	Gareth Peter Jones	577		
Plaid Cymru	Clive Ian Gary Smith	548		
Green	Yvonne Marjorie Holley	534		
Conservative	Philip Malcolm Bray	477		
Conservative	Warren Michael Charles Jones	460		
Green	Derek Alexander McBrier	418		
Independent	David Verson Phillips	305		
Socialist Alternative	Alec Thraves	258		
Socialist Alternative	Robert Williams	227		
Labour hold		Swing		
Labour hold		Swing		
Labour hold		Swing		
Labour hold		Swing		

=== Clydach (two seats) ===
Sylvia Lewis had been elected as an Independent in 1999.

Clydach 2004
Party	Candidate	Votes	%	±%
Labour	Roger Llewellyn Smith*	1,107		
Liberal Democrats	Sylvia Mary Lewis*	761		
Plaid Cymru	James Vernon Davies	595		
Labour	Islwyn Hopkins	589		
Liberal Democrats	Julie Marlene Davies	486		
Conservative	Robert Andrew Evans	172		
Conservative	Jonathan Bray Stockting	131		
Labour hold		Swing		
Liberal Democrats hold		Swing		

=== Cockett (four seats) ===
Cockett 2004
Party	Candidate	Votes	%	±%
Plaid Cymru	William Keith Morgan*	1,452		
Plaid Cymru	Adrian Hugh Rees	1,406		
Plaid Cymru	John Rhodri Thomas	1,338		
Plaid Cymru	Enid Vanessa Webb	1,200		
Labour	Anna Mary Pennock	1,029		
Labour	Clive Keith Morgan	954		
Labour	John Abraham	861		
Labour	Hazel Mary Morris	820		
Liberal Democrats	Nicola Anne Holley	652		
Liberal Democrats	Tudor Richard Donne	555		
Green	Ann Elizabeth Cashman	331		
Green	Timothy Edward Pope	314		
Green	John Michael Thomas	288		
Green	Marguerite Esther White	287		
Plaid Cymru hold		Swing		
Plaid Cymru hold		Swing		
Plaid Cymru gain from Labour		Swing		
Plaid Cymru gain from Labour		Swing		

=== Cwmbwrla (three seats) ===
Cwmbwrla 2004
Party	Candidate	Votes	%	±%
Liberal Democrats	Peter Malcolm Black*	1,873		
Liberal Democrats	Christopher Ashleigh Holley*	1,621		
Liberal Democrats	Lewis Graham Thomas*	1,483		
Labour	John Alun James	339		
Labour	Terence James Hennegan	307		
Labour	Malcolm David Smith	278		
Green	Frederick Keith Coleman	155		
Green	Martin William Jones	129		
Liberal Democrats hold		Swing		
Liberal Democrats hold		Swing		
Liberal Democrats hold		Swing		

=== Dunvant (two seats) ===
Dunvant 2004
Party	Candidate	Votes	%	±%
Liberal Democrats	John Newbury*	1,163		
Liberal Democrats	Nicholas John Tregoning*	915		
Independent	Elizabeth Ann Davies	445		
Labour	Nigel Mark Rees	218		
Liberal Democrats hold		Swing		
Liberal Democrats hold		Swing		

=== Fairwood (one seat) ===
Elected as an Independent in 1995, John Bushell successfully defended the seat as a Conservative in 1999 but now again stood, unsuccessfully, as an Independent.

Fairwood 2004
Party	Candidate	Votes	%	±%
Conservative	Paxton Richard Hood‐Williams	470		
Independent	John Gunther Bushell*	405		
Labour	John Howell Guy	162		
Green	Rhodri Griffiths John	138		
Liberal Democrats	Andrew Whitt	57		
Conservative hold		Swing		

=== Gorseinon (one seat) ===
Gorseinon 2004
Party	Candidate	Votes	%	±%
Labour	Glyn Seabourne*	441		
Plaid Cymru	Darren Jeffery Thomas	207		
Independent	Giuseppe Vittorio Bruno	181		
Conservative	Carrie Baylis Cooper	110		
Labour hold		Swing		

=== Gower (one seat) ===
Gower 2004
Party	Candidate	Votes	%	±%
Independent	Richard David Lewis*	883		
Conservative	Marjorie Jennifer Stubbings	391		
Labour	David Raymond Beech	186		
Green	David Charles Howells	185		
Independent hold		Swing		

=== Gowerton (one seat) ===
Gowerton 2004
Party	Candidate	Votes	%	±%
Labour	Ronald Morgan Thomas*	612		
Conservative	Peter Davies	494		
Liberal Democrats	William James Cherrington	328		
Labour hold		Swing		

=== Killay North (one seat) ===
Killay North 2004
Party	Candidate	Votes	%	±%
Liberal Democrats	Mary Helen Jones*	699		
Conservative	David Nicholas Thomas	212		
Labour	Nigel Alan Robins	103		
Liberal Democrats hold		Swing		

=== Killay South (one seat) ===
Killay South 2004
Party	Candidate	Votes	%	±%
Liberal Democrats	Gerald Glyn Clement*	798		
Conservative	James Barrington Geen Harding	165		
Liberal Democrats hold		Swing		

=== Kingsbridge (one seat) ===
Kingsbridge 2004
Party	Candidate	Votes	%	±%
Labour	William Gethin Evans*	566		
Plaid Cymru	Pauline A. Selvage	305		
Conservative	Anthony Allan Winchester	284		
Liberal Democrats	Howard James Rees	200		
Labour hold		Swing		

=== Landore (two seats) ===
Landore 2004
Party	Candidate	Votes	%	±%
Liberal Democrats	Vivian Nigel Abbott	821		
Liberal Democrats	Robert Speht	775		
Labour	Thomas Michael White	694		
Labour	Nigel Shreeve	656		
Independent	Gerald Murphy	193		
Independent	Kenneth Philip Skinner	122		
Liberal Democrats gain from Labour		Swing		
Liberal Democrats gain from Labour		Swing		

=== Llangyfelach (one seat) ===
Llangyfelach 2004
Party	Candidate	Votes	%	±%
Independent	David Gareth Sullivan*	888		
Labour	Geoffrey Archer	272		
Conservative	Garath Donald John Williams	223		
Independent hold		Swing		

=== Llansamlet (four seats) ===
Elected as an Independent in 1999, June Evans subsequently joined the Independent group.

Llansamlet 2004
Party	Candidate	Votes	%	±%
Independent	June Evans*	1,176		
Labour	Dennis Henry James*	1,063		
Labour	Lawrence David Bailey*	1,062		
Labour	Yvonne Veronica Jardine	975		
Labour	Penelope Margaret Matthews	939		
Plaid Cymru	Carolyne Shan Couch	770		
Liberal Democrats	Christopher Cuff	598		
Conservative	Stephen Neil Hughes	566		
Conservative	Christian John Holliday	509		
Conservative	Andrew David Morgan	504		
Independent hold		Swing		
Labour hold		Swing		
Labour hold		Swing		
Labour hold		Swing		

=== Lower Loughor (one seat) ===
Lower Loughor 2004
Party	Candidate	Votes	%	±%
Labour	Daniel Raymond James*	218		
Independent	Clive Ernest Watters	196		
Conservative	Robert John Charles Fisher	92		
Plaid Cymru	John William Griffiths	73		
Independent	Richard Gordon Evans	66		
Liberal Democrats	Margaret Elaine Cherrington	14		
Labour hold		Swing		

=== Mawr (one seat) ===
Mawr 2004
Party	Candidate	Votes	%	±%
People's Representative	Ioan Merritt Richard*	620		
Conservative	Simon Jeffrey Trick	82		
Others hold		Swing		

=== Mayals (one seat) ===
Mayals 2004
Party	Candidate	Votes	%	±%
Liberal Democrats	Rene Harwood Kinzett	708		
Conservative	Dorian Gerald Rowbottom	206		
Independent	David Charles Evans*	179		
Labour	Jeffrey William Walton	64		
Plaid Cymru	Eiry Miles	56		
Green	Philip Joel Swinnerton	33		
Liberal Democrats gain from Independent		Swing		

=== Morriston (five seats) ===
Morriston 2004
Party	Candidate	Votes	%	±%
Labour	Michael John Hedges*	1,958		
Labour	Robert John Lloyd*	1,813		
Labour	William John Francis Davies*	1,758		
Labour	Robert Francis-Davies*	1,738		
Labour	Robert Charles Stewart	1,726		
Liberal Democrats	Helen Ceri Jones	1,443		
Liberal Democrats	Debra Louise Anthony	1,414		
Liberal Democrats	Steven John Moss	1,300		
Liberal Democrats	Stuart Anthony Vaughan	1,234		
Liberal Democrats	Jacob Mbu Oben	1,051		
Plaid Cymru	Charlotte Aull Davies	732		
Conservative	William Hughes	691		
Conservative	Thomas Patrick Morgan	576		
Conservative	Paul Raymond Morris	462		
Conservative	Sonya Winifred Rachel Morris	446		
Green	Deborah James	398		
Green	Colin Keith Donnan	337		
Green	John Rasbridge	308		
Labour hold		Swing		
Labour hold		Swing		
Labour hold		Swing		
Labour hold		Swing		
Labour hold		Swing		

=== Mynyddbach (three seats) ===
Mynyddbach 2004
Party	Candidate	Votes	%	±%
Independent	Audrey Rose Ann Clement	1,512		
Labour	Ceinwen Thomas*	1,141		
Independent	Austin Raymond Welsby	1,119		
Labour	Byron George Owen*	1,081		
Labour	Charles Glyndwr White*	925		
Liberal Democrats	Lesley Jayne Price	628		
Independent gain from Labour		Swing		
Labour hold		Swing		
Independent gain from Labour		Swing		

=== Newton (one seat) ===
Newton 2004
Party	Candidate	Votes	%	±%
Liberal Democrats	Susan Mary Waller*	652		
Conservative	Anthony Charles Saunders Colburn	636		
Green	Karen Anne Laurence	112		
Liberal Democrats hold		Swing		

=== Oystermouth (one seat) ===
Oystermouth 2004
Party	Candidate	Votes	%	±%
Conservative	Joan Thyrza Gwenllian Peters*	702		
Labour	John Roger Warren Evans	383		
Liberal Democrats	Zoe Francesca James‐Williams	252		
Green	Paul Stewart Wimbush	145		
Conservative hold		Swing		

=== Penclawdd (one seat) ===
Penclawdd 2004
Party	Candidate	Votes	%	±%
Independent	David Paul Tucker	890		
Labour	Terence John Snell	386		
Conservative	Gordon Howells	126		
Green	Walter Raymond Stock	95		
Independent hold		Swing		

=== Penderry (three seats) ===
Penderry 2004
Party	Candidate	Votes	%	±%
Labour	June Elizabeth Burtonshaw*	913		
Labour	Grenville Phillips*	871		
Labour	Doreen Jones*	870		
Green	James Anthony Young	472		
Green	Linda Beynon	423		
Liberal Democrats	Gaynor Meehan	402		
Green	Christine Mary Norman	349		
Labour win (new seat)				
Labour win (new seat)				
Labour win (new seat)				

=== Penllergaer (one seat) ===
Penllergaer 2004
Party	Candidate	Votes	%	±%
Independent	Elizabeth Wendy Fitzgerald	595		
Labour	Dennis Joseph Lawlor	205		
Conservative	Janice Birch	99		
Independent hold		Swing		

=== Pennard (one seat) ===
Pennard 2004
Party	Candidate	Votes	%	±%
Independent	Margaret Smith*	574		
Liberal Democrats	Andrew Crawford Thomas	402		
Green	Lawrence Daniel Fancourt	161		
Labour	Andrew John Jones	101		
Independent hold		Swing		

=== Penyrheol (two seats) ===
Penyrheol 2004
Party	Candidate	Votes	%	±%
Labour	Alison Marsha Seabourne	694		
Labour	David Islwyn Elfed Jones*	676		
Independent	Peter William Woollard	564		
Liberal Democrats	David Anthony Griffiths	321		
Conservative	Paul Curtis De La Mare	304		
Conservative	Eleanor Mary Davies	270		
Labour hold		Swing		
Labour hold		Swing		

=== Pontarddulais (two seats) ===
Pontarddulais 2004
Party	Candidate	Votes	%	±%
Labour	John Treharne Miles*	1,239		
Labour	Philip Downing	983		
Plaid Cymru	Eifion Davies	959		
Conservative	Lyndon Richard Jones	299		
Conservative	Margaret Chegwin Jones	231		
Labour hold		Swing		
Labour hold		Swing		

=== Sketty (five seats) ===
Sketty 2004
Party	Candidate	Votes	%	±%
Liberal Democrats	Rosina June Stanton*	2,366		
Liberal Democrats	Arthur Michael Day*	1,940		
Conservative	Thomas Huw Rees*	1,628		
Liberal Democrats	Cheryl Lynne Philpott	1,445		
Conservative	Anthony Trevor Lloyd*	1,398		
Conservative	Keith Houston Meyrick Crawford	1,322		
Liberal Democrats	Paul Michael Meara	1,316		
Conservative	Hayden Edward Jones	1,305		
Conservative	David William Helliwell	1,274		
Liberal Democrats	Edward Whittaker	1,156		
Labour	Joseph Brian Cainen	889		
Labour	Geraint Owens	840		
Labour	Parvaiz Arshad Ali	793		
Labour	Maureen Clough‐Stuckey*	762		
Labour	Peter Leonard Rowlands	726		
Plaid Cymru	Sian Thomas	592		
Green	Heather Brooks	407		
Green	Sandra Christina Shrewsbury	367		
Green	Nicholas Gregory Gaylor	358		
Green	Neil Robert Hooper	270		
Green	Howard John Jago	231		
Liberal Democrats hold		Swing		
Liberal Democrats hold		Swing		
Conservative hold		Swing		
Liberal Democrats hold		Swing		
Conservative hold		Swing		

=== St. Thomas (two seats) ===
St Thomas 2004
Party	Candidate	Votes	%	±%
Independent	David Alan Robinson	1,150		
Labour	Alan Rees Richards*	742		
Labour	Cyril Frederick Johnstone*	648		
Green	Teresa Brzoza	521		
Liberal Democrats	Jonathan Clarke	277		
Independent gain from Labour		Swing		
Labour hold		Swing		

=== Townhill (three seats) ===
Townhill 2004
Party	Candidate	Votes	%	±%
Labour	David Henry Hopkins*	689		
Labour	Geoffrey Hugh Burtonshaw	665		
Labour	William Edwin Alan Jones	653		
Independent	Terence Porter	444		
Liberal Democrats	Andrew Paul Jones	344		
Plaid Cymru	Gregory Lee Evans	299		
Liberal Democrats	Phillip Richard Stanford	284		
Plaid Cymru	Hazel Pauline McKnight	259		
Liberal Democrats	Forbes Neil Lopez	216		
Green	Christopher Scott Warwick	122		
Green	Kingsley Vincent Evans	120		
Green	Marcus Kit Petz	85		
Labour hold		Swing		
Labour hold		Swing		
Labour hold		Swing		

=== Uplands (four seats) ===
Uplands 2004
Party	Candidate	Votes	%	±%
Liberal Democrats	Peter May	1,373		
Liberal Democrats	Stuart James Rice	1,354		
Liberal Democrats	Claire Margaret Waller	1,230		
Liberal Democrats	Jayne Woodman	1,120		
Labour	Derek James*	769		
Labour	Gwion Iqbal Malik	710		
Labour	Hardev Aswani	692		
Labour	Moira Ann Singh*	676		
Independent	Dick Phillips	649		
Green	Martyn John Shrewsbury	616		
Independent	Angela Lewis	600		
Conservative	Richard Oliver John	507		
Independent	Susan Rosemary Sturgess	493		
Independent	Lavinia Gay Mitchell	493		
Independent	Phillip Norman Stapleton	482		
Conservative	Philip David Helliwell	472		
Green	463	816		
Plaid Cymru	Christian Downing	440		
Plaid Cymru	Omer Williams	436		
Plaid Cymru	Nicholas Atkin‐Walsh	419		
Plaid Cymru	Harri Llwyd Roberts	414		
Green	Andrew Niel Hammond	376		
Green	Mary Roberta Marquand	352		
Democratic Alliance	Nortridge Perrott	83		
Liberal Democrats gain from Labour		Swing		
Liberal Democrats gain from Labour		Swing		
Liberal Democrats gain from Labour		Swing		
Liberal Democrats gain from Labour		Swing		

=== Upper Loughor (two seats) ===
Possible boundary change. the number of seats was reduced from two to one

Upper Loughor 2004
Party	Candidate	Votes	%	±%
Plaid Cymru	Darren Price	404		
Labour	David Alcwyn Evans*	305		
Liberal Democrats	James Bernard Kelleher	113		
Conservative	Nigel Thomas Packer	79		
Plaid Cymru gain from Labour		Swing		

=== West Cross (two seats) ===
West Cross 2004
Party	Candidate	Votes	%	±%
Labour	Desmond Wilfred William Thomas	909		
Labour	Mark Clive Child*	939		
Conservative	Vera Margaret Duncan	702		
Conservative	David Monro Donaldson	688		
Independent	Christopher Leonard McNeff	474		
Liberal Democrats	Christopher Gareth Davies	354		
Liberal Democrats	Jonathan Owain Burchell	309		
Green	Steve Heydon	166		
Green	Geraldine Sara Noott	147		
Labour hold		Swing		
Labour hold		Swing		
