= 1999 City and County of Swansea Council election =

1999 Welsh local government election

The second election to City and County of Swansea Council was held in May 1999. It was preceded by the 1995 election and followed by the 2004 election.

== Overview ==
All council seats were up for election. These were the second elections held following local government reorganisation and the abolition of West Glamorgan County Council.

== Boundaries ==
There were some changes in ward boundaries for this election. The numbers of councillors changed in some wards, resulting in an overall increase in councillors to 72, as a result of The City and County of Swansea (Electoral Arrangements) Order 1998.

== Candidates ==
The contests were fought by most of the main parties but Labour was the only one to contest the majority of seats.

== Results and election summary ==
City and County of Swansea Council election result 1999
Party	Seats	Gains	Losses	Net gain/loss	Seats %	Votes %	Votes	+/−
Labour	47				65.2			
Liberal Democrats	10				13.8			
Conservative	4				5.5			
Plaid Cymru	2				2.7			
Independent	7				9.7			
Independent Labour	1				1.3			
Other Parties	1				1.3			
Green	0				0.0		1,616	

== Results by ward ==
* = sitting councillor in this ward prior to election

=== Bishopston (one seat) ===
Bishopston 1999
Party	Candidate	Votes	%	±%
Independent	Keith Edmund Marsh	Unopposed		
Independent gain from Liberal Democrats				

=== Bonymaen (two seats) ===
The Independent candidate had captured the seat from Labour at a by-election.

Bonymaen 1999
Party	Candidate	Votes	%	±%
Independent	John Brian Hague*	1,246		
Labour	Mair Eluned Gibbs*	1,240		
Labour	Wyndham Parry Davies	632		
Liberal Democrats	Nora Maria O'Sullivan	311		
Independent hold		Swing		
Labour hold		Swing		

=== Castle (four seats) ===
Possible boundary change. The number of seats increased from three to four. David Phillips had previously represented the Uplands ward.

Castle 1999
Party	Candidate	Votes	%	±%
Labour	Robert Alan Lloyd*	1,622		
Labour	Barbara Joyce Hynes*	1,579		
Labour	David Phillips	1,477		
Labour	Dereck John Roberts*	1,440		
Plaid Cymru	Yvonne Marie Davies	1,111		
Liberal Democrats	Yvonne Marjorie Holley	937		
Green	Benjamin David Grigg	632		
Conservative	Paul Raymond Morris	503		
Conservative	Sonya Winifred R. Morris	477		
United Socialists	David Richard Warren	273		
Labour hold		Swing		
Labour hold		Swing		
Labour win (new seat)				
Labour hold		Swing		

=== Clydach (two seats) ===
Possible boundary change. The number of seats increased from one to two.

Clydach 1999
Party	Candidate	Votes	%	±%
Independent	Sylvia Mary Lewis*	963		
Labour	Roger Llewellyn Smith	845		
Labour	Bryan Edwin Ayres*	844		
Plaid Cymru	James Vernon Davies	764		
Plaid Cymru	Diana Owen	697		
Independent	Denise Preece	509		
Independent win (new seat)				
Labour hold		Swing		

=== Cockett (four seats) ===
Dai Lloyd had won a seat from Labour at a by-election.

Cockett 1999
Party	Candidate	Votes	%	±%
Plaid Cymru	David Rhys Lloyd*	2,366		
Labour	Lilian Maud Hopkin*	1,902		
Plaid Cymru	William Keith Morgan	1,581		
Labour	Victor Cyril Alexander*	1,528		
Plaid Cymru	Adrian Hugh Rees	1,478		
Plaid Cymru	Nicholas Walsh	1,381		
Labour	Ann Pennock	1,343		
Labour	Clive Keith Morgan*	1,231		
Liberal Democrats	Tudor Richard Donne	639		
Plaid Cymru hold		Swing		
Labour hold		Swing		
Plaid Cymru gain from Labour		Swing		
Labour hold		Swing		

=== Cwmbwrla (three seats) ===
Possible boundary change. The number of seats increased from two to three.

Cwmbwrla 1999
Party	Candidate	Votes	%	±%
Liberal Democrats	Peter Malcolm Black*	2,172		
Liberal Democrats	Christopher Ashleigh Holley*	1,909		
Liberal Democrats	Lewis Graham Thomas	1,722		
Labour	Carolyn Harris	867		
Labour	Brian Trevor George Ludlam	722		
Labour	Robert Mark Ludlam	657		
Liberal Democrats hold		Swing		
Liberal Democrats hold		Swing		
Liberal Democrats win (new seat)				

=== Dunvant (two seats) ===
Possible boundary change. The number of seats increased from one to two. Labour had held the single seat ward in 1995.

Dunvant 1999
Party	Candidate	Votes	%	±%
Liberal Democrats	John Newbury	1,083		
Liberal Democrats	Nicholas John Tregoning	627		
Independent	Elizabeth Ann Davies	491		
Labour	Hardev Aswani	395		
Labour	Diana Samuel	370		
Conservative	David Nicholas Thomas	219		
Liberal Democrats gain from Labour		Swing		
Liberal Democrats win (new seat)				

=== Fairwood (one seat) ===
Elected as an Independent in 1995, John Bushell successfully defended the seat as a Conservative.

Fairwood 1999
Party	Candidate	Votes	%	±%
Conservative	John Gunther Bushell*	655		
Labour	John Sydney Mills	514		
Conservative hold		Swing		

=== Gorseinon (one seat) ===
The former wards of Gorseinon Central and Gorseinon East were combined. Glyn Seabourne was councillor for Gorseinon East prior to this election.

Gorseinon 1999
Party	Candidate	Votes	%	±%
Labour	Glyn Seabourne*	558		
Plaid Cymru	Darren Jeffery Thomas	401		
Conservative	Eleanor Mary Davies	89		
Labour hold		Swing		

=== Gower (one seat) ===
Gower 1999
Party	Candidate	Votes	%	±%
Independent	Richard David Lewis*	770		
Labour	Anthont John Beddow	366		
Liberal Democrats	Hildegarde Ann Roberts	296		
Conservative	Gordon Howells	185		
Independent hold		Swing		

=== Gowerton (one seat) ===
The former wards of Gowerton East and Gowerton West were combined. Ronald Thomas was councillor for Gowerton East prior to this election.

Gowerton 1999
Party	Candidate	Votes	%	±%
Labour	Ronald Morgan Thomas*	722		
Plaid Cymru	Alan Morgan Griffiths	395		
Independent	Peter Davies	335		
Conservative	Keith Roberts	121		
Green	David Charles Howells	68		
Labour hold		Swing		

=== Killay North (one seat) ===
Killay North 1999
Party	Candidate	Votes	%	±%
Liberal Democrats	Mary Helen Jones	396		
Labour	Perry Stephen Buck*			
Independent	George Smith Gunn	292		
Independent	Stuart James Rice	230		
Conservative	Philip David Helliwell	167		
Liberal Democrats gain from Labour		Swing		

=== Killay South (one seat) ===
Killay South 1999
Party	Candidate	Votes	%	±%
Liberal Democrats	Gerald Glyn Clement*	790		
Labour	Jeffrey William Walton	203		
Conservative	Sarah Jane Cadogan	131		
Liberal Democrats hold		Swing		

=== Kingsbridge (one seat) ===
Possible boundary change. The number of seats reduced from two to one. Labour had held both seats in 1995.

Kingsbridge 1999
Party	Candidate	Votes	%	±%
Labour	William Gethin Evans*	650		
Plaid Cymru	Katherine Mary Stock	590		
Liberal Democrats	Michael John Barry	220		
Labour hold		Swing		

=== Landore (two seats) ===
Landore 1999
Party	Candidate	Votes	%	±%
Labour	Derek Herbert Cox*	913		
Labour	Holland William Ayres*	900		
Liberal Democrats	Robert Speht	516		
Labour hold		Swing		
Labour hold		Swing		

=== Llangyfelach (one seat) ===
Possible boundary change. The number of seats reduced from two to one. Independents had held both seats in 1995. Phil Downing had been elected for the now-abolished

Llangyfelach 1999
Party	Candidate	Votes	%	±%
Independent	David Gareth Sullivan*	644		
People's Representative	Audrey R.A. Clement*	538		
Labour	Philip Downing*	283		
Conservative	William H.E. Alabaster	65		
Independent hold		Swing		

=== Llansamlet (four seats) ===
Possible boundary change. The number of seats increased from three to four.

Llansamlet 1995
Party	Candidate	Votes	%	±%
Labour	Lawrence David Bailey*	1,682		
Labour	June Evans*	1,646		
Labour	Paul Lloyd*	1,410		
Labour	Dennis Henry James	1,260		
Liberal Democrats	Richard David George	903		
Community First	Kevin Adrian John	747		
Community First	Margaret Lydia Harris	686		
Community First	Peter Gilbert Harris	558		
Community First	Frederick S. Lewis	552		
Conservative	Robert William Megson	471		
Labour win (new seat)				
Labour win (new seat)				
Labour win (new seat)				
Labour win (new seat)				

=== Lower Loughor (one seat) ===
Lower Loughor 1999
Party	Candidate	Votes	%	±%
Labour	Daniel Raymond James*	unopposed		
Labour hold		Swing		

=== Mawr (one seat) ===
Mawr 1999
Party	Candidate	Votes	%	±%
People's Representative	Ioan Merritt Richard*	646		
Labour	Brian Charles Kennedy	164		
Liberal Democrats	Michael Haller	61		
People's Representative gain from Plaid Cymru				

=== Mayals (one seat) ===
Mayals 1999
Party	Candidate	Votes	%	±%
Independent	David Charles Evans	386		
Conservative	Michael George Shellard	358		
Liberal Democrats	Neil Sinclair Lewis	273		
Labour	David Ian Collins	209		
Independent gain from Liberal Democrats		Swing		

=== Morriston (five seats) ===
Possible boundary change. The number of seats increased from four to five.

Morriston 1999
Party	Candidate	Votes	%	±%
Labour	Michael John Hedges*	2,939		
Labour	William John F. Davies*	2,869		
Labour	Robert Francis-Davies*	2,798		
Labour	Robert John Lloyd*	2,687		
Labour	Valerie Lloyd	2,576		
Liberal Democrats	John Philip Bleay	1,527		
Conservative	William Hughes	1,201		
Labour hold		Swing		
Labour hold		Swing		
Labour hold		Swing		
Labour hold		Swing		
Labour win (new seat)				

=== Mynyddbach (three seats) ===
Mynyddbach 1999
Party	Candidate	Votes	%	±%
Labour	Ceinwen Thomas*	1,984		
Labour	Byron George Owen*	1,826		
Labour	Charles Glyndwr White	1,616		
Plaid Cymru	Laurence Douthwaite John	1,082		
Liberal Democrats	Elwyn Vernon Jones	759		
Conservative	Martyn Ford	490		
Labour hold		Swing		
Labour hold		Swing		
Labour hold		Swing		

=== Newton (one seat) ===
Newton 1999
Party	Candidate	Votes	%	±%
Liberal Democrats	Susan Mary Waller*	745		
Conservative	Anthony Charles Saunders Colburn	475		
Labour	Jane Melanie Thomas	259		
Liberal Democrats hold		Swing		

=== Oystermouth (one seat) ===
Oystermouth 1999
Party	Candidate	Votes	%	±%
Conservative	Joan Thyrza Peters*	709		
Labour	Aubrey Jones	482		
Liberal Democrats	Alexander James	211		
Plaid Cymru	Mari Elin Waddington	206		
Conservative hold		Swing		

=== Penclawdd (one seat) ===
Penclawdd 1999
Party	Candidate	Votes	%	±%
Independent	Howard John Morgan*	975		
Labour	Owen James Guy	671		
Independent hold		Swing		

=== Penderry (three seats) ===
Possible boundary change. The number of seats reduced from four to three. Doreen Jones represented Mynyddbach from 1995 until 1999

Penderry 1999
Party	Candidate	Votes	%	±%
Labour	Doreen Jones*	1,461		
Labour	June Elizabeth Burtonshaw*	1,422		
Labour	Grenville Phillips*	1,414		
Liberal Democrats	Gaynor Meehan	611		
Conservative	Jason Peter Morgan	348		
Labour hold		Swing		
Labour hold		Swing		
Labour hold		Swing		

=== Penllergaer (one seat) ===
Penllergaer 1999
Party	Candidate	Votes	%	±%
Labour	Dennis Lawlor	581	71.0	+11.8
Conservative	J. Lowe	237	29.0	+29.0
Labour hold		Swing		

=== Pennard (one seat) ===
Pennard 1999
Party	Candidate	Votes	%	±%
Independent	Margaret Smith*	unopposed		
Independent hold		Swing		

=== Penyrheol (two seats) ===
Penyrheol 1995
Party	Candidate	Votes	%	±%
Labour	David Thomas Vernon Davies*	950		
Labour	David Islwyn Elfed Jones*	772		
Independent	Carloine Ann Arthur	703		
Liberal Democrats	Stephen Josef Neesmann	431		
Conservative	John Timothy	181		
Labour hold		Swing		
Labour hold		Swing		

=== Pontarddulais (two seats) ===
Boundary Change. The number of seats increased from one to two. John Miles represented the Talybont ward which was abolished.

Pontarddulais 1999
Party	Candidate	Votes	%	±%
Labour	Gareth Williams*	1,355		
Labour	John Treharne Miles*	1,278		
Independent	David Thomas Howells	791		
Independent	Owen Leroy Evans	677		
Liberal Democrats	Janine Linda Evans	252		
Conservative	Dorothy Roberta Gardiner	121		
Labour hold		Swing		
Labour win (new seat)				

=== Sketty (five seats) ===
Possible boundary change. The number of seats increased from four to five. June Stanton was elected as an Independent in 1995 but subsequently joined the Liberal Democrats.

Sketty 1999
Party	Candidate	Votes	%	±%
Liberal Democrats	Rosina June Stanton*	3,037		
Labour	Mehar Chand Verma*	1,853		
Liberal Democrats	Arthur Michael Day	1,725		
Conservative	Thomas Huw Rees	1,526		
Conservative	John Philip Glew	1,465		
Labour	Gordon Carruthers*	1,426		
Liberal Democrats	Tracey Anne Dunford	1,274		
Labour	Anthea Priscilla Symonds	1,247		
Labour	Patrick Richard Ellis	1,142		
Liberal Democrats	Lilian Mary Pritchard	1,132		
Independent	Anthony Trevor Lloyd	1,129		
Conservative	Philip Malcolm Bray	1,111		
Liberal Democrats	Dyfed E.F. Alsop	1,105		
Conservative	Mark Roy Burgess	1,101		
Labour	Leonard Bayzile Howell*	1,060		
Plaid Cymru	Ian Richard Titherington	1,043		
Plaid Cymru	Sara Eirwen Reid	1,036		
Liberal Democrats win (new seat)				
Labour win (new seat)				
Liberal Democrats win (new seat)				
Conservative win (new seat)				
Conservative win (new seat)				

=== St Thomas (two seats) ===
St Thomas 1995
Party	Candidate	Votes	%	±%
Labour	Cyril Frederick Johnstone*	1,154		
Labour	Alan Rees Richards*	1,124		
Independent	David Alan Robinson	747		
Liberal Democrats	Paul Courtney Jones	268		
Conservative	Jonathan Geoffrey Bidmead	195		
Labour hold		Swing		
Labour hold		Swing		

=== Townhill (three seats) ===
Possible boundary change. The number of seats increased from two to three.

Townhill 1999
Party	Candidate	Votes	%	±%
Labour	Tyssul Lewis*	968		
Labour	David Hopkins*	913		
Labour	William Frederick Stuckey	724		
Liberal Democrats	Beryl Edwards	693		
Plaid Cymru	Gregory Lee Evans	377		
Independent	Anthony Roper	351		
Liberal Democrats	Gordon C. Manning	338		
Independent	Margaret Louvane Abraham	297		
Labour win (new seat)				
Labour win (new seat)				
Labour win (new seat)				

=== Uplands (four seats) ===
Uplands 1999
Party	Candidate	Votes	%	±%
Labour	Jennifer Caryl Hood	1,352		
Labour	Derek James	1,349		
Labour	Maureen Clough Stuckey*	1,336		
Labour	Moira Ann Singh	1,302		
Conservative	Dick Phillips	1,226		
Plaid Cymru	Harri Lloyd Roberts	1,126		
Plaid Cymru	Clive Ian Gary Smith	1,062		
Conservative	Jean Margaret Taverner	1,010		
Liberal Democrats	Peter Richard Brooks	1,002		
Independent	Susan Rosemary Sturgess	882		
Neighbourhood Independent	Peter May	877		
Conservative	Robert James Buckland	875		
Conservative	Brian Hill-Mackintosh	846		
Green	Simon Mark Clegg	816		
Labour hold		Swing		
Labour hold		Swing		
Labour hold		Swing		
Labour hold		Swing		

=== Upper Loughor (two seats) ===
Possible boundary change. the number of seats was reduced from two to one

Upper Loughor 1999
Party	Candidate	Votes	%	±%
Labour	David Alcwyn Evans*	516		
Plaid Cymru	John Griffiths	390		
Labour hold		Swing		

=== West Cross (two seats) ===
The Liberal Democrats won a by-election following the election of previous member Martin Caton as MP for Gower.

West Cross 1999
Party	Candidate	Votes	%	±%
Labour	Desmond Wilfred W. Thomas	1,094		
Labour	Mark Clive Child	1,004		
Liberal Democrats	Rene Harood Kinzett*	649		
Conservative	Lynne Davies	609		
Liberal Democrats	Reginald C. Edwards	565		
Conservative	Vera Margaret Duncan	512		
Plaid Cymru	Dafydd Rhys Robert	367		
Labour hold		Swing		
Labour gain from Liberal Democrats		Swing		
