= 2017 City and County of Swansea Council election =

City and County of Swansea Council

Results of the 2017 City and County of Swansea Council election

The 2017 election to the City and County of Swansea Council was held on 4 May 2017 as part of wider local elections across Wales. The election was preceded by the 2012 election. Labour maintained control of the authority.

The next full council elections took place in May 2022.

== Results ==
City and County of Swansea Council election result 2017
Party	Seats	Gains	Losses	Net gain/loss	Seats %	Votes %	Votes	+/−
Labour	48	2	3	-1				
Liberal Democrats	7	0	5	-5				
Independent	7	2	1	+1				
Conservative	8	4	0	+4				
Plaid Cymru	0							
Green	0			0				
Uplands	2	2	0	+2				
TUSC	0			0				
People's Representative	0	0	1	-1				

== Ward results ==
The following results were announced following the elections. In the case of wards electing more than one councillor the percentage figures reflect the number of ballot papers issued rather than the total number of votes.

=== Bishopston (one seat) ===
Bishopston 2017
Party	Candidate	Votes	%	±%
Conservative	Lyndon Jones	620		
Independent	Keith Marsh*	440		
Labour	Adam Gilbert	397		
Green	Karen Laurence	63		
Majority				
Turnout			56.8	+16.7
Conservative gain from Independent		Swing		

Independent Keith Marsh lost the seat he had held for eighteen years.

=== Bonymaen (two seats) ===
Bonymaen 2017
Party	Candidate	Votes	%	±%
Labour	Mandy Evans*	1,050		
Labour	Paul Lloyd*	1,010		
Plaid Cymru	Geraint Couch	249		
Conservative	Elaine Hughes	227		
Conservative	Wendy Olsen	210		
Turnout			28.9	−3.3
Labour hold		Swing		
Labour hold		Swing		

=== Castle (four seats) ===
Castle 2017
Party	Candidate	Votes	%	±%
Labour	Sybil Crouch*	1,820		
Labour	Erika Kirchner*	1,772		
Labour	Fiona Gordon*	1,763		
Labour	David Phillips*	1,716		
Conservative	Paul Morris	568		
Conservative	Sonya Morris	534		
Conservative	Mohammad Amin Doha	425		
Conservative	Akshit Sanjiv Khanna	411		
Plaid Cymru	Shan Couch	349		
Plaid Cymru	Damian Martin	254		
UKIP	Stan Robinson	247		
Liberal Democrats	Charlene Anika	237		
Liberal Democrats	Owen Roberts	235		
Green	David Smith	220		
Plaid Cymru	Harri Roberts	210		
Liberal Democrats	Thomas Davies	203		
Plaid Cymru	David Richards	191		
Liberal Democrats	Benjamin Williams	191		
TUSC	Alec Thraves	112		
TUSC	Claire Job	97		
TUSC	Colin John	89		
Turnout			29.8	+0.8
Labour hold		Swing		
Labour hold		Swing		
Labour hold		Swing		
Labour hold		Swing		

=== Clydach (two seats) ===
Clydach 2017
Party	Candidate	Votes	%	±%
Independent	Gordon Walker*	1,211		
Labour	Paulette Smith*	1,134		
Labour	Julie Davies	825		
Plaid Cymru	Elgan Davies-Jones	387		
Conservative	David Rowlands-Lean	311		
Conservative	Roda Ali	230		
Turnout			28.4	−8.0
Independent hold		Swing		
Labour hold		Swing		

=== Cockett (four seats) ===
Cockett 2017
Party	Candidate	Votes	%	±%
Labour	Mike Durke	1,839		
Labour	Wendy Lewis	1,792		
Labour	Oliver James	1,714		
Labour	Elliott King	1,528		
Conservative	Keith Hedges	791		
Conservative	Deidre Lomer-Hedges	721		
Conservative	Jack Powell	674		
Conservative	Jack Huang	622		
Liberal Democrats	Nicola Holley	510		
Plaid Cymru	Patricia Sanderson	494		
Plaid Cymru	Adrian Rees	476		
Plaid Cymru	David Lewis	417		
Liberal Democrats	Jon Coffey	349		
Liberal Democrats	James Kelleher	328		
Liberal Democrats	William Morgan	279		
Turnout			32.7	−0.2
Labour hold		Swing		
Labour hold		Swing		
Labour hold		Swing		
Labour hold		Swing		

=== Cwmbwrla (three seats) ===
Cwmbwrla 2017
Party	Candidate	Votes	%	±%
Liberal Democrats	Peter Black*	1,430		
Liberal Democrats	Christopher Holley*	1,239		
Liberal Democrats	Lewis Thomas*	1,199		
Labour	Ann Cook	674		
Labour	Isobel Norris	626		
Labour	Andrew Crowley	583		
Conservative	Robert Dowdle	147		
Conservative	Mark Lloyd	134		
Conservative	Henri Davies	98		
Turnout			38.2	+3.0
Liberal Democrats hold		Swing		
Liberal Democrats hold		Swing		
Liberal Democrats hold		Swing		

=== Dunvant (two seats) ===
Dunvant 2017
Party	Candidate	Votes	%	±%
Labour	Louise Gibbard	694		
Labour	Jennifer Raynor*	680		
Conservative	Matthew Gates	436		
Conservative	Andrew Silvertsen	403		
Liberal Democrats	Hugh Tregoning	313		
Liberal Democrats	Nicholas Tregoning	220		
Turnout			42.0	+3.1
Labour gain from Liberal Democrats		Swing		
Labour hold		Swing		

=== Fairwood (one seat) ===
Fairwood 2017
Party	Candidate	Votes	%	±%
Conservative	Paxton Hood‐Williams*	819		
Labour	Steve Hopkins	274		
Green	Abi Cherry-Hamer	95		
Turnout			52.8	+3.1
Conservative hold		Swing		

=== Gorseinon (one seat) ===
Gorseinon 2017
Party	Candidate	Votes	%	±%
Labour	Kelly Roberts	501		
Plaid Cymru	Darren Thomas	241		
Conservative	Rebecca Walters	209		
Independent	Stuart Hemsley-Rice	141		
Turnout			33.4	+0.7
Labour hold		Swing		

=== Gower (one seat) ===
Gower 2017
Party	Candidate	Votes	%	±%
Independent	Richard Lewis*	864		
Labour	Thomas Dunn	359		
Conservative	Thomas Jones	278		
Turnout			51.9	+4.4
Independent gain from Liberal Democrats		Swing		

Sitting member Richard Lewis switched back from the Lib Dems to the Independents.

=== Gowerton (one seat) ===
Gowerton 2012
Party	Candidate	Votes	%	±%
Independent	Susan Jones*	818		
Labour	Nicola Matthews	637		
Conservative	Christopher Elvins	268		
Turnout			28.8	−8.2
Independent hold		Swing		

=== Killay North (one seat) ===
Killay North 2017
Party	Candidate	Votes	%	±%
Liberal Democrats	Mary Jones*	371		
Labour	Angela James	184		
Conservative	Denise Howard	157		
Plaid Cymru	Rhydian Fitter	87		
Turnout			40.5	+16.8
Liberal Democrats hold		Swing		

=== Killay South (one seat) ===
Killay South 2017
Party	Candidate	Votes	%	±%
Liberal Democrats	Jeffrey Jones*	327		
Conservative	Martin Quaile	305		
Labour	Greg James	272		
Turnout			49.1	+5.4
Liberal Democrats hold		Swing		

=== Kingsbridge (one seat) ===
Kingsbridge 2017
Party	Candidate	Votes	%	±%
Labour	William Evans*	722		
Conservative	Stephen Phillips	484		
Independent	Aimee Hemsley-Rice	256		
Turnout			28.1	−8.2
Labour hold		Swing		

=== Landore (two seats) ===
Landore 2017
Party	Candidate	Votes	%	±%
Labour	Beverley Hopkins*	1,054		
Labour	Michael White*	1,015		
Conservative	Elizabeth Thomas	225		
Conservative	David Thomas	208		
UKIP	Mozid Abdul	117		
Turnout			28.5	−6.6
Labour hold		Swing		
Labour hold		Swing		

=== Llangyfelach (one seat) ===
Llangyfelach 2017
Party	Candidate	Votes	%	±%
Independent	David Sullivan*	564		
Labour	Wayne Morgan	509		
Conservative	Paul Doughton	424		
Turnout			38.7	+8.8
Independent hold		Swing		

=== Llansamlet (four seats) ===
Llansamlet 2017
Party	Candidate	Votes	%	±%
Labour	Ryland Doyle*	1,899		
Labour	Penelope Matthews*	1,882		
Labour	Alyson Pugh	1,765		
Labour	Mo Sykes	1,414		
Independent	Tony Paget	852		
Conservative	William Davies	777		
Conservative	Stephanie Whitehead	610		
Conservative	George Field	592		
Liberal Democrats	Helen Thomas	551		
Conservative	Jake Wrightson	510		
UKIP	Linda Farrell	464		
Labour hold		Swing		
Labour hold		Swing		
Labour hold		Swing		
Labour hold		Swing		
Turnout			31.0	+0.7

=== Lower Loughor (one seat) ===
Lower Loughor 2017
Party	Candidate	Votes	%	±%
Labour	Julie Richards*	602		
Conservative	Raymond Hinds	107		
Turnout			40.6	+7.6
Labour hold		Swing		

=== Mawr (one seat) ===
Mawr 2017
Party	Candidate	Votes	%	±%
Conservative	Brigette Rowlands	265		
Plaid Cymru	Linda Frame	193		
Labour	John Bidwell	167		
Independent	Geraint Turner	115		
Conservative gain from Independent		Swing		
Turnout			52.9	+8.1

=== Mayals (one seat) ===
Mayals 2017
Party	Candidate	Votes	%	±%
Conservative	Linda Tyler-Lloyd*	627		
Independent	Helen Mitchell	271		
Labour	Joanne Fitton	207		
Conservative hold		Swing		
Turnout			52.3	+6.2

=== Morriston (five seats) ===
Morriston 2017
Party	Candidate	Votes	%	±%
Labour	Robert Stewart*	2,434		
Labour	Ceri Evans	2,396		
Labour	Robert Francis-Davies*	2,111		
Labour	Andrea Lewis*	2,051		
Labour	Yvonne Jardine	2,025		
Conservative	Daniel Boucher	1,509		
Conservative	Robert James	1,200		
Conservative	Matthew Lloyd	1,117		
Plaid Cymru	Steffan Phillips	1,076		
Conservative	Jayne Isaac	870		
Conservative	Thabo Khumalo	851		
Labour hold		Swing		
Labour hold		Swing		
Labour hold		Swing		
Labour hold		Swing		
Labour hold		Swing		
Turnout			34.4	+4.4

=== Mynyddbach (three seats) ===
Mynyddbach 2017
Party	Candidate	Votes	%	±%
Labour	Mike Lewis	1,605		
Labour	Samuel Pritchard	1,275		
Labour	Gloria Tanner*	1,190		
Conservative	Thomas Morgan	625		
Conservative	Marina Howells	565		
Conservative	Thomas Howells	549		
Labour hold		Swing		
Labour hold		Swing		
Labour hold		Swing		
Turnout			33.5	−1.4

=== Newton (one seat) ===
Newton 2017
Party	Candidate	Votes	%	±%
Conservative	William Thomas	861		
Labour	Rob Marshall	540		
Independent	Tracey Duffy	114		
Green	Raymond Laurence	43		
Conservative hold		Swing		
Turnout			56.8	+10.9

=== Oystermouth (one seat) ===
The previous Conservative candidate stood as an Independents@Swansea candidate.

Oystermouth 2017
Party	Candidate	Votes	%	±%
Conservative	Myles Langstone	645		
Labour	Stephen Williams	526		
Independent	Anthony Colburn*	213		
Independent	Dorian Davies	123		
Independent	Paul Whittaker	91		
Green	Anna Pigott	75		
Conservative hold		Swing		
Turnout			51.6	+4.4

=== Penclawdd (one seat) ===
Penclawdd 2017
Party	Candidate	Votes	%	±%
Labour	Mark Thomas*	712		
Conservative	Gordon Howells	440		
Plaid Cymru	John Davies	130		
Labour hold		Swing		
Turnout			44.1	−2.5

=== Penderry (three seats) ===
Penderry 2017
Party	Candidate	Votes	%	±%
Labour	June Burtonshaw*	1,101		
Labour	Terry Hennegan*	1,100		
Labour	Hazel Morris*	1,084		
Conservative	Peter Trotman	336		
Green	James Young	319		
Conservative	Paul Hambly	314		
Conservative	Taryn Trotman	279		
Labour hold		Swing		
Labour hold		Swing		
Labour hold		Swing		
Turnout			21.7	−0.5

=== Penllergaer (one seat) ===
Penllergaer 2017
Party	Candidate	Votes	%	±%
Independent	Elizabeth Fitzgerald*	1,035		
Labour	Michelle Morgan	143		
Conservative	Roberta Jones	36		
Independent hold		Swing		
Turnout			47.7	+5.2

=== Pennard (one seat) ===
Pennard 2017
Party	Candidate	Votes	%	±%
Independent	Lynda James*	564		
Conservative	Fred Cunliffe	408		
Labour	Susan Rodaway	323		
Independent hold		Swing		
Turnout			59.0	+6.7

=== Penyrheol (two seats) ===
Penyrheol 2017
Party	Candidate	Votes	%	±%
Labour	Jan Curtice*	1,013		
Labour	Andrew Stevens	967		
Plaid Cymru	Jim Dunckley	455		
Conservative	Laura Gilbert	440		
Conservative	Elizabeth Trotman	346		
Plaid Cymru	Patrick Powell	166		
Labour hold		Swing		
Labour hold		Swing		
Turnout			39.9	+5.7

=== Pontarddulais (two seats) ===
Pontarddulais 2017
Party	Candidate	Votes	%	±%
Independent	Kevin Griffiths	832		
Labour	Philip Downing*	801		
Labour	Jane Harris*	667		
Independent	Byron Lewis	634		
Conservative	Irene Wilkins	344		
Conservative	Mohammad Samer Saad	262		
UKIP	Ken Haynes	154		
Independent gain from Labour		Swing		
Labour hold		Swing		
Turnout			25.6	−13.4

=== Sketty (five seats) ===
Sketty 2017
Party	Candidate	Votes	%	±%
Labour	Peter Jones	1,645		
Liberal Democrats	Cheryl Philpott*	1,599		
Liberal Democrats	Michael Day*	1,593		
Conservative	Stephen Gallagher	1,531		
Conservative	David Helliwell	1,450		
Conservative	Rebecca Singh	1,360		
Labour	Geraint Owens	1,354		
Conservative	Mark Ritchie	1,331		
Liberal Democrats	Thomas Rees*	1,310		
Labour	Ben Jenkins	1,300		
Labour	Greg Kaminaris	1,265		
Conservative	Matthew Smith	1,218		
Liberal Democrats	Phil Hall	1,216		
Labour	Maciej Krzymieniecki	1,161		
Liberal Democrats	James McGettrick	905		
Plaid Cymru	Sian Thomas	618		
Independent	Matthew Jones	593		
Independent	Paula Pritchard	469		
Turnout			44.6	+6.6
Labour gain from Liberal Democrats		Swing		
Liberal Democrats hold		Swing		
Liberal Democrats hold		Swing		
Conservative gain from Liberal Democrats		Swing		
Conservative gain from Liberal Democrats		Swing		

=== St Thomas (two seats) ===
St Thomas 2017
Party	Candidate	Votes	%	±%
Labour	Joe Hale*	1,285		
Labour	Clive Lloyd*	1,235		
Conservative	Elizabeth Thomas	253		
Conservative	Owain Thomas	212		
UKIP	Clifford Johnson	151		
Labour hold		Swing		
Labour hold		Swing		
Turnout			30.3	+0.4

=== Townhill (three seats) ===
Townhill 2017
Party	Candidate	Votes	%	±%
Labour	Cyril Anderson	1,090		
Labour	David Hopkins*	1,044		
Labour	Lesley Walton*	1,009		
Conservative	Ross Lock	261		
UKIP	Gary North	243		
Conservative	Marguerite Tcheko	233		
TUSC	Owen Herbert	155		
Labour hold		Swing		
Labour hold		Swing		
Labour hold		Swing		
Turnout			26.4	+0.7

=== Uplands (four seats) ===
Uplands 2017
Party	Candidate	Votes	%	±%
Uplands	Peter May*	1,705		
Labour	Nick Davies*	1,247		
Uplands	Irene Mann	1,216		
Labour	Mary Sherwood	1,171		
Uplands	Rhys Morgan	1,137		
Labour	Uzo Iwobi	1,132		
Labour	Jamie White	1,104		
Uplands	Ewan May	1,023		
Green	Gareth Tucker	391		
Liberal Democrats	Jayne Woodman	386		
Liberal Democrats	Janet Thomas	379		
Women's Equality	Sally Smith	333		
Liberal Democrats	Mike O'Carroll	316		
Conservative	Lewys Phillips	280		
Conservative	John Evans	268		
Conservative	Adam Ganczakowski	262		
Conservative	Jack Simcock	259		
Uplands gain from Labour		Swing		
Labour hold		Swing		
Uplands gain from Labour		Swing		
Labour hold		Swing		
Turnout			37.8	+11.0

=== Upper Loughor (one seat) ===
Upper Loughor 2017
Party	Candidate	Votes	%	±%
Labour	Robert Smith*	638		
Conservative	Barbara Jones	235		
TUSC	Mark Evans	30		
Labour hold		Swing		
Turnout			42.5	+6.7

=== West Cross (two seats) ===
West Cross 2017
Party	Candidate	Votes	%	±%
Labour	Mark Child*	1,178		
Labour	Desmond Thomas*	1,085		
Conservative	Kate Smith	1,054		
Conservative	Matthew Gilbert	1,035		
Green	Christopher Evans	192		
UKIP	Colin Beckett	138		
Labour hold		Swing		
Labour hold		Swing		
Turnout			32.6	−6.3

* = sitting councillor in this ward prior to election

== By-elections ==
=== Castle ===
Castle: 6 May 2021
Party	Candidate	Votes	%	±%
Labour	Hannah Lawson	1,637	44.0	−7.2
Liberal Democrats	San Bennett	694	18.7	+12.0
Conservative	Jacob Derluk	424	11.4	−4.6
Plaid Cymru	Harri Roberts	423	11.4	+1.6
Green	Jon Pitans	185	5.0	−1.2
UKIP	Stan Robinson	120	3.2	−3.8
Independent	Mike Harcourt	105	2.8	N/A
Independent	Heather Burdett	73	2.0	N/A
TUSC	Gareth Bromhall	58	1.6	−1.6
Majority		943	25.3	
Turnout		3,719		
Labour hold		Swing	▼9.6	

=== Llansamlet ===
Llansamlet: 6 May 2021
Party	Candidate	Votes	%	±%
Labour	Matthew Jones	2,492	60.0	+18.2
Plaid Cymru	Ioan Gruffydd	887	21.3	N/A
Green	Rhiannon Wall	426	10.3	N/A
Liberal Democrats	David Jones	351	8.4	−3.7
Majority		1,605	38.7	
Turnout		4,156		
Labour hold		Swing	▲1.6	
