= 2008 City and County of Swansea Council election =

2008 Welsh local government election

Results of the 2008 City and County of Swansea Council election

The fourth election to the City and County of Swansea Council was held in May 2008. It was preceded by the 2004 election and followed by the 2012 election.

== Overview ==
All council seats were up for election. These were the fourth elections held following local government reorganisation and the abolition of West Glamorgan County Council. The Council remained under no overall control, the Labour Party having lost their majority on the authority in 2004.

== Candidates ==
The contests were fought by most of the main parties, with Labour and the Conservatives contesting all but one or two of the seats.

== Overall result ==
City and County of Swansea Council election result 2008
| Party | Seats | Gains | Losses | Net gain/loss | Seats % | Votes % | Votes | +/− |
|---|---|---|---|---|---|---|---|---|
| Labour | | | | | | | | |
| Conservative | | | | | | | | |
| Liberal Democrats | | | | | | | | |
| Plaid Cymru | | | | | | | | |
| Independent | | | | | | | | |
| Green | 0 | | | | | | | |

== Results by ward ==
* = sitting councillor in this ward prior to election

=== Bishopston (one seat) ===
Bishopston 2008
| Party | Candidate | Votes | % | ±% |
|---|---|---|---|---|
| Independent | Keith Edmund Marsh* | 730 | | |
| Conservative | Carole Maureen Hyde | 516 | | |
| Green | Rashid Malik | 110 | | |
| Turnout | | | 49.7 | |
| Independent hold | | Swing | | |

=== Bonymaen (two seats) ===
Bonymaen 2008
| Party | Candidate | Votes | % | ±% |
|---|---|---|---|---|
| Labour | Mair Eluned Gibbs* | 1,052 | | |
| Independent | John Brian Hague* | 893 | | |
| BNP | Sion Lynford Owens | 447 | | |
| Turnout | | | 34.2 | |
| Labour hold | | Swing | | |
| Independent hold | | Swing | | |

=== Castle (four seats) ===
Castle 2008
| Party | Candidate | Votes | % | ±% |
|---|---|---|---|---|
| Labour | Robert Alan Lloyd* | 1,105 | | |
| Labour | David Phillips* | 1,029 | | |
| Labour | Erika Theresa Kirchner* | 1,009 | | |
| Labour | Barbara Joyce Hynes* | 999 | | |
| Liberal Democrats | Gareth Peter Jones | 735 | | |
| Liberal Democrats | Stephanie David | 726 | | |
| Liberal Democrats | Tanya Auxiliadora May | 724 | | |
| Liberal Democrats | David Gerald Joseph | 702 | | |
| Plaid Cymru | Rhys Aeron Jones | 520 | | |
| Plaid Cymru | Hugh Nigel Parsons | 484 | | |
| Plaid Cymru | Patrick John Powell | 478 | | |
| Conservative | Harri Lloyd Davies | 432 | | |
| Plaid Cymru | Harri Lloyd Roberts | 411 | | |
| Conservative | Paul Raymond Morris | 388 | | |
| Conservative | Sonya Winifred Rachel Morris | 353 | | |
| Conservative | Alexander Stonor | 350 | | |
| Socialist Alternative | Alec Thraves | 172 | | |
| Independent | Colin John Davies | 151 | | |
| Independent | David Mark Davies | 115 | | |
| Communist | Michael Carty | 112 | | |
| The Left Party | Moodie Rachid Khaldi | 95 | | |
| Turnout | | | 28.3 | |
| Labour hold | | Swing | | |
| Labour hold | | Swing | | |
| Labour hold | | Swing | | |
| Labour hold | | Swing | | |

=== Clydach (two seats) ===
Clydach 2008
| Party | Candidate | Votes | % | ±% |
|---|---|---|---|---|
| Labour | Roger Llewellyn Smith* | 1,115 | | |
| Labour | Paulette Bradley Smith | 820 | | |
| Liberal Democrats | Sylvia Mary Lewis* | 710 | | |
| Independent | Julie Marlene Davies | 509 | | |
| Liberal Democrats | Janice Maureen Jarman | 322 | | |
| Conservative | Janice Birch | 248 | | |
| Conservative | Barry John Stubbings | 226 | | |
| Turnout | | | 38.1 | |
| Labour hold | | Swing | | |
| Labour gain from Liberal Democrats | | Swing | | |

=== Cockett (four seats) ===
Cockett 2008
| Party | Candidate | Votes | % | ±% |
|---|---|---|---|---|
| Liberal Democrats | Keith Morgan* | 1,102 | | |
| Liberal Democrats | Nicola Anne Holley | 1,047 | | |
| Liberal Democrats | James Bernard Kelleher | 996 | | |
| Liberal Democrats | Veronyca Anne Bates Hughes | 993 | | |
| Labour | Anna Mary Pennock | 985 | | |
| Labour | Andrew John Jones | 946 | | |
| Labour | Susan Grace Lewis | 932 | | |
| Plaid Cymru | John Rhodri Thomas* | 879 | | |
| Labour | John Abraham | 878 | | |
| Plaid Cymru | Adrian Hugh Rees* | 870 | | |
| Plaid Cymru | Enid Vanessa Webb* | 866 | | |
| Plaid Cymru | Jonathan Clive Howes | 835 | | |
| Conservative | Lisa Emma Gilmore | 363 | | |
| Conservative | David William Turner | 360 | | |
| Conservative | Craig James Robert Lawton | 348 | | |
| Conservative | William Mathew Ogborne | 345 | | |
| Turnout | | | 33.5 | |
| Liberal Democrats hold | | Swing | | |
| Liberal Democrats gain from Plaid Cymru | | Swing | | |
| Liberal Democrats gain from Plaid Cymru | | Swing | | |
| Liberal Democrats gain from Plaid Cymru | | Swing | | |

Plaid councilor Keith Morgan had defected to the Liberal Democrats since the previous election.

=== Cwmbwrla (three seats) ===
Cwmbwrla 2008
| Party | Candidate | Votes | % | ±% |
|---|---|---|---|---|
| Liberal Democrats | Peter Black* | 1,804 | | |
| Liberal Democrats | Christopher Holley* | 1,662 | | |
| Liberal Democrats | Lewis Graham Thomas* | 1,335 | | |
| Labour | Cyril Anderson | 526 | | |
| Labour | Peter David Meehan | 453 | | |
| Labour | Malcolm David Smith | 403 | | |
| Conservative | Peter James Demery | 139 | | |
| Conservative | Martin William Jones | 111 | | |
| Conservative | Margaret Jones | 103 | | |
| Turnout | | | 38.8 | |
| Liberal Democrats hold | | Swing | | |
| Liberal Democrats hold | | Swing | | |
| Liberal Democrats hold | | Swing | | |

=== Dunvant (two seats) ===
Dunvant 2008
| Party | Candidate | Votes | % | ±% |
|---|---|---|---|---|
| Liberal Democrats | John Newbury* | 992 | | |
| Liberal Democrats | Nicholas John Tregoning* | 855 | | |
| Independent | Roy Thomas Adams | 262 | | |
| Labour | Christine Mary Hosgood-Jones | 254 | | |
| Labour | Peter Leonard Rowlands | 198 | | |
| Conservative | James Barrington Geen Harding | 192 | | |
| Independent | Rowland Bevan | 165 | | |
| Conservative | David Rudolf Heinrich | 143 | | |
| Turnout | | | 45.8 | |
| Liberal Democrats hold | | Swing | | |
| Liberal Democrats hold | | Swing | | |

=== Fairwood (one seat) ===
Fairwood 2008
| Party | Candidate | Votes | % | ±% |
|---|---|---|---|---|
| Conservative | Paxton Hood‐Williams* | 607 | | |
| Liberal Democrats | David Henry Owen Elliott | 304 | | |
| Independent | John Gunther Bushell | 158 | | |
| Independent | Elisabeth Ann Davies | 66 | | |
| Green | Ana Rosa Boyain-Y-Goitia Griffiths | 48 | | |
| Turnout | | | 52.3 | |
| Conservative hold | | Swing | | |

=== Gorseinon (one seat) ===
Gorseinon 2008
| Party | Candidate | Votes | % | ±% |
|---|---|---|---|---|
| Labour | Glyn Seabourne* | 315 | | |
| Independent | Gillian Nansi Evans | 229 | | |
| Plaid Cymru | Darren Jeffery Thomas | 210 | | |
| Independent | Diane Christine Freeman | 148 | | |
| Conservative | William John Verney Ley | 119 | | |
| Turnout | | | 35.3 | |
| Labour hold | | Swing | | |

=== Gower (one seat) ===
Gower 2008
| Party | Candidate | Votes | % | ±% |
|---|---|---|---|---|
| Independent | Richard David Lewis* | 771 | | |
| Conservative | Marjorie Jennifer Stubbings | 587 | | |
| Labour | Michael John Shaw | 144 | | |
| Green | David Charles Howells | 136 | | |
| Turnout | | | 53.4 | |
| Independent hold | | Swing | | |

=== Gowerton (one seat) ===
Gowerton 2008
| Party | Candidate | Votes | % | ±% |
|---|---|---|---|---|
| Independent | Susan Mary Jones | 535 | | |
| Conservative | Lyndon Richard Jones | 491 | | |
| Labour | Ronald Morgan Thomas* | 475 | | |
| Liberal Democrats | Michael John Sheehan | 181 | | |
| Turnout | | | 41.9 | |
| Independent gain from Labour | | Swing | | |

=== Killay North (one seat) ===
Killay North 2008
| Party | Candidate | Votes | % | ±% |
|---|---|---|---|---|
| Liberal Democrats | Mary Helen Jones* | 646 | | |
| Conservative | Gareth Raymond Milne | 236 | | |
| Labour | Jason James Sannegadu | 192 | | |
| Turnout | | | 34.3 | |
| Liberal Democrats hold | | Swing | | |

=== Killay South (one seat) ===
Killay South 2008
| Party | Candidate | Votes | % | ±% |
|---|---|---|---|---|
| Liberal Democrats | Jeffrey William Jones | 463 | | |
| Conservative | Martyn Ford | 247 | | |
| Labour | Michael Edward Harper | 168 | | |
| Green | Peter Kenneth Jones | 119 | | |
| Turnout | | | 50.5 | |
| Liberal Democrats hold | | Swing | | |

=== Kingsbridge (one seat) ===
Kingsbridge 2008
| Party | Candidate | Votes | % | ±% |
|---|---|---|---|---|
| Labour | William Evans* | 541 | | |
| Independent | Catherine Emma Maiden | 458 | | |
| Plaid Cymru | Pauline Ann Selvage | 184 | | |
| Conservative | Phillip Edward Sillick | 314 | | |
| Turnout | | | 46.0 | |
| Labour hold | | Swing | | |

=== Landore (two seats) ===
Landore 2008
| Party | Candidate | Votes | % | ±% |
|---|---|---|---|---|
| Liberal Democrats | Vivian Nigel Abbott* | 836 | | |
| Liberal Democrats | Robert Speht* | 793 | | |
| Labour | Thomas Michael White | 585 | | |
| Labour | John Alun James | 552 | | |
| BNP | Susan Josephine Harwood | 189 | | |
| Conservative | Mark Anthony Burnett | 95 | | |
| Conservative | Henri Lloyd Davies | 71 | | |
| Turnout | | | 35.9 | |
| Liberal Democrats hold | | Swing | | |
| Liberal Democrats hold | | Swing | | |

=== Llangyfelach (one seat) ===
Llangyfelach 2008
| Party | Candidate | Votes | % | ±% |
|---|---|---|---|---|
| Independent | David Gareth Sullivan* | 894 | | |
| Conservative | Louise Margaret Alabaster | 306 | | |
| Green | John Edward Rasbridge | 180 | | |
| Turnout | | | 36,2 | |
| Independent hold | | Swing | | |

=== Llansamlet (four seats) ===
Llansamlet 2008
| Party | Candidate | Votes | % | ±% |
|---|---|---|---|---|
| Labour | Penelope Matthews | 1,119 | | |
| Labour | Dennis Henry James* | 1,109 | | |
| Labour | Christopher Ryland Doyle | 919 | | |
| Independent | June Evans* | 912 | | |
| Labour | Royston Richards | 877 | | |
| Independent | Carl William Lewis | 753 | | |
| Independent | Margaret Lydia Harris | 722 | | |
| BNP | Clive Bennett | 635 | | |
| Plaid Cymru | Carolyne Shan Couch | 616 | | |
| Conservative | Janine Michelle Ida Barnes | 520 | | |
| Conservative | Jonathan Kieth Barnes | 511 | | |
| Conservative | Christian John Holliday | 475 | | |
| Liberal Democrats | Rosemarie Bridgeman | 411 | | |
| Liberal Democrats | Mathew James Reacord | 379 | | |
| Conservative | Geoffrey Raymond Lloyd | 361 | | |
| Labour hold | | Swing | | |
| Labour hold | | Swing | | |
| Labour hold | | Swing | | |
| Independent hold | | Swing | | |
| Turnout | | | 31.2 | |

=== Lower Loughor (one seat) ===
Lower Loughor 2008
| Party | Candidate | Votes | % | ±% |
|---|---|---|---|---|
| Labour | Julie Christine Richards | 284 | | |
| Independent | Clive Ernest Watters | 141 | | |
| Conservative | Andrew Froude Fritche | 120 | | |
| Plaid Cymru | James Michael Dunckley | 110 | | |
| Labour hold | | Swing | | |
| Turnout | | | 36.7 | |

=== Mawr (one seat) ===
Mawr 2008
| Party | Candidate | Votes | % | ±% |
|---|---|---|---|---|
| People's Representative | Ioan Merritt Richard* | 450 | | |
| Plaid Cymru | Linda Mary Frame | 156 | | |
| Labour | Howard Owen Griffiths | 65 | | |
| Conservative | Andrew Patrick Sivertsen | 56 | | |
| Others hold | | Swing | | |
| Turnout | | | 48.6 | |

=== Mayals (one seat) ===
Mayals 2008
| Party | Candidate | Votes | % | ±% |
|---|---|---|---|---|
| Conservative | Rene Harwood Kinzett | 545 | | |
| Independent | Peter Geoffrey Birch | 465 | | |
| Labour | Juliet Anne Fortey | 190 | | |
| Conservative gain from Liberal Democrats | | Swing | | |
| Turnout | | | 54.7 | |

Elected as a Lib Dem in 2004, Rene Kinzett joined the Conservatives.

=== Morriston (five seats) ===
Morriston 2008
| Party | Candidate | Votes | % | ±% |
|---|---|---|---|---|
| Labour | Michael Hedges* | 2,159 | | |
| Labour | Robert John Lloyd* | 1,776 | | |
| Labour | Robert Charles Stewart | 1,768 | | |
| Labour | William John Francis Davies* | 1,741 | | |
| Labour | Robert Francis-Davies* | 1,669 | | |
| Liberal Democrats | Helen Ceri Clarke | 1,528 | | |
| Liberal Democrats | Jonathan Clarke | 1,427 | | |
| Liberal Democrats | Owen Roberts | 1,223 | | |
| Liberal Democrats | Rachael Elizabeth Hitchinson | 1,214 | | |
| Liberal Democrats | Robert Morrison Samuel | 1,142 | | |
| Plaid Cymru | Richard Jones Jones | 778 | | |
| BNP | Alan Bateman | 678 | | |
| Plaid Cymru | Hywel Rhys Couch | 619 | | |
| Conservative | Michael James Byrne | 584 | | |
| Conservative | Robert Ivor James | 574 | | |
| Conservative | Paul Frank Briggs | 557 | | |
| Conservative | Thomas Patrick Caradog Morgan | 523 | | |
| Conservative | Sheila Morgan | 500 | | |
| Labour hold | | Swing | | |
| Labour hold | | Swing | | |
| Labour hold | | Swing | | |
| Labour hold | | Swing | | |
| Labour hold | | Swing | | |
| Turnout | | | 34.7 | |

=== Mynyddbach (three seats) ===
Mynyddbach 2008
| Party | Candidate | Votes | % | ±% |
|---|---|---|---|---|
| Labour | Ceinwen Thomas* | 1,077 | | |
| Labour | Byron George Owen | 930 | | |
| Independent | Audrey Rose Ann Clement* | 911 | | |
| Independent | Austin Raymond Welsby* | 861 | | |
| Labour | Charles Glyndwr White | 855 | | |
| Independent | John Evans | 626 | | |
| Independent | Oswyn Clement | 589 | | |
| Conservative | Karan Cheryl Sivertsen | 362 | | |
| Conservative | Glyndwr Jones | 281 | | |
| Conservative | Martha Jones | 258 | | |
| Labour hold | | Swing | | |
| Labour gain from Independent | | Swing | | |
| Independent hold | | Swing | | |
| Turnout | | | 36.7 | |

=== Newton (one seat) ===
Newton 2008
| Party | Candidate | Votes | % | ±% |
|---|---|---|---|---|
| Liberal Democrats | Susan Mary Waller* | 718 | | |
| Conservative | David Nicholas Thomas | 497 | | |
| Green | Stephanie Cuff | 115 | | |
| Liberal Democrats hold | | Swing | | |
| Turnout | | | 47.9 | |

=== Oystermouth (one seat) ===
Oystermouth 2008
| Party | Candidate | Votes | % | ±% |
|---|---|---|---|---|
| Conservative | Anthony Charles Saunders Colburn | 556 | | |
| Liberal Democrats | Roger Barnabas Beynon | 436 | | |
| Green | Rhodri Griffiths | 263 | | |
| Independent | Joan Thyrza Gwenllian Peters* | 241 | | |
| Conservative hold | | Swing | | |
| Turnout | | | 42.9 | |

The former Conservative councillor Joan Peters stood as an Independent, but was defeated.

=== Penclawdd (one seat) ===
Penclawdd 2008
| Party | Candidate | Votes | % | ±% |
|---|---|---|---|---|
| Independent | David Paul Tucker* | 676 | | |
| Labour | John Hywel Guy | 499 | | |
| Conservative | Gordon Howells | 201 | | |
| Plaid Cymru | Robin Lowe | 112 | | |
| Independent hold | | Swing | | |
| Turnout | | | 49.6 | |

=== Penderry (three seats) ===
Penderry 2008
| Party | Candidate | Votes | % | ±% |
|---|---|---|---|---|
| Labour | Grenville Phillips* | 931 | | |
| Labour | June Elizabeth Burtonshaw* | 921 | | |
| Labour | Hazel Mary Morris | 850 | | |
| Green | James Anthony Young | 470 | | |
| Liberal Democrats | Vivienne Anne Samuel | 455 | | |
| Green | Linda Beynon | 411 | | |
| Liberal Democrats | Matthew James O'Grady | 387 | | |
| Liberal Democrats | Claire Margaret Smalley | 328 | | |
| Labour win (new seat) | | | | |
| Labour win (new seat) | | | | |
| Labour win (new seat) | | | | |
| Turnout | | | 23.2 | |

=== Penllergaer (one seat) ===
Penllergaer 2008
| Party | Candidate | Votes | % | ±% |
|---|---|---|---|---|
| Independent | Elizabeth Wendy Fitzgerald* | 873 | | |
| Labour | Nigel Mark Rees | 56 | | |
| Conservative | Paul Sivertsen | 48 | | |
| Green | Carol Smith | 27 | | |
| Independent hold | | Swing | | |
| Turnout | | | 45.6 | |

=== Pennard (one seat) ===
Pennard 2008
| Party | Candidate | Votes | % | ±% |
|---|---|---|---|---|
| Conservative | Margaret Smith* | 432 | | |
| Independent | Christopher Bede James | 288 | | |
| Independent | Alexander Richard Lewis | 183 | | |
| Independent | Andrew Crawford Thomas | 151 | | |
| Plaid Cymru | Dewi Richard Evans | 135 | | |
| Green | Peter John Middleton | 101 | | |
| Conservative gain from Independent | | Swing | | |
| Turnout | | | 57.2 | |

Margaret Smith previously sat as an Independent.

=== Penyrheol (two seats) ===
Penyrheol 2008
| Party | Candidate | Votes | % | ±% |
|---|---|---|---|---|
| Labour | David Islwyn Elfed Jones* | 574 | | |
| Independent | Alan Jopling | 553 | | |
| Labour | Alison Marsha Seabourne* | 531 | | |
| Independent | Peter William Woollard | 502 | | |
| Plaid Cymru | Sandra Eileen Monk | 349 | | |
| Conservative | Martin Werner Sivertsen | 233 | | |
| Conservative | Robert Bradshaw Wilkinson | 215 | | |
| Labour hold | | Swing | | |
| Independent gain from Labour | | Swing | | |
| Turnout | | | | |

=== Pontarddulais (two seats) ===
Pontarddulais 2008
| Party | Candidate | Votes | % | ±% |
|---|---|---|---|---|
| Labour | John Treharne Miles* | 656 | | |
| Independent | David Thomas Howells | 641 | | |
| Labour | Philip Downing* | 593 | | |
| Independent | Byron Calvin Lewis | 514 | | |
| Plaid Cymru | Eifion Davies | 479 | | |
| Plaid Cymru | Eiry Miles | 405 | | |
| Independent | John Mathias | 289 | | |
| Conservative | Glen Brian Routledge | 164 | | |
| Conservative | Robert Fisher | 123 | | |
| Labour hold | | Swing | | |
| Independent gain from Labour | | Swing | | |
| Turnout | | | 47.2 | |

=== Sketty (five seats) ===
Sketty 2008
| Party | Candidate | Votes | % | ±% |
|---|---|---|---|---|
| Liberal Democrats | Rosina June Stanton* | 2,604 | | |
| Liberal Democrats | Arthur Michael Day* | 2,201 | | |
| Liberal Democrats | Thomas Huw Rees* | 2,084 | | |
| Liberal Democrats | Cheryl Lynne Philpott | 2,076 | | |
| Liberal Democrats | Paul Michael Meara | 1,601 | | |
| Conservative | Anthony Trevor Lloyd* | 1,593 | | |
| Conservative | Lavinia Gay Mitchell | 1,443 | | |
| Conservative | David William Helliwell | 1,347 | | |
| Conservative | Alice Christina Sumner | 1,340 | | |
| Conservative | Robert Thornton Dowdle | 1,126 | | |
| Labour | Ian Anthony James | 888 | | |
| Labour | Jennifer Louise White | 723 | | |
| Labour | James Harwood White | 705 | | |
| Plaid Cymru | Sian Thomas | 693 | | |
| Labour | Ashaa Rasul Iftikhar | 686 | | |
| Labour | Yvonne Veronica Jardine | 666 | | |
| Green | Patricia Emma Helena Jones | 599 | | |
| Turnout | | | 43.5 | |
| Liberal Democrats hold | | Swing | | |
| Liberal Democrats hold | | Swing | | |
| Liberal Democrats hold | | Swing | | |
| Liberal Democrats hold | | Swing | | |
| Liberal Democrats gain from Conservative | | Swing | | |

Huw Rees was elected as a Conservative in 2004 but subsequently joined the Liberal Democrats.

=== St Thomas (two seats) ===
St Thomas 2008
| Party | Candidate | Votes | % | ±% |
|---|---|---|---|---|
| Independent | Mervyn Rhys Jones | 1,049 | | |
| Independent | David Alan Robinson* | 1,009 | | |
| Labour | Alan Rees Richards* | 780 | | |
| Labour | Patricia Mary Richards | 548 | | |
| Conservative | Jonathan Owain Burchell | 84 | | |
| Conservative | Darren Robert Hann | 82 | | |
| Independent gain from Labour | | Swing | | |
| Independent hold | | Swing | | |
| Turnout | | | 38.4 | |

=== Townhill (three seats) ===
Townhill 2008
| Party | Candidate | Votes | % | ±% |
|---|---|---|---|---|
| Labour | David Henry Hopkins* | 772 | | |
| Labour | Nicholas Stuart Bradley | 749 | | |
| Labour | William Edwin Alan Jones* | 682 | | |
| Liberal Democrats | Jacqueline Church | 382 | | |
| Liberal Democrats | James Sheridan | 375 | | |
| Independent | Terence Porter | 330 | | |
| Liberal Democrats | Thomas Caldas | 284 | | |
| Plaid Cymru | Hazel Pauline McKnight | 235 | | |
| Independent | Susan Rosemary Sturgess | 183 | | |
| Conservative | Simon David Clason Bevan | 119 | | |
| Conservative | Vincent Bishop | 109 | | |
| Conservative | Dayne Ryan Powell | 91 | | |
| Labour hold | | Swing | | |
| Labour hold | | Swing | | |
| Labour hold | | Swing | | |
| Turnout | | | 27.0 | |

=== Uplands (four seats) ===
Uplands 2008
| Party | Candidate | Votes | % | ±% |
|---|---|---|---|---|
| Liberal Democrats | Peter Nicholas May* | 1,828 | | |
| Liberal Democrats | Stuart James Rice* | 1,706 | | |
| Liberal Democrats | Jayne Woodman* | 1,495 | | |
| Liberal Democrats | Janet Mary Thomas | 1,488 | | |
| Labour | Sybil Edith Crouch | 817 | | |
| Labour | Andrew Daniel Connell | 792 | | |
| Labour | Ian William James Ross | 765 | | |
| Labour | Derek James | 729 | | |
| Conservative | Dick Phillips | 593 | | |
| Green | Andrew Russell Lumley Smith | 561 | | |
| Conservative | Simon Keith Bickley Bright | 500 | | |
| Conservative | David John Rodway | 472 | | |
| Plaid Cymru | Annest Wiliam | 404 | | |
| Conservative | Norman Thomas Whitlock | 403 | | |
| Green | Steven Mark Clegg | 391 | | |
| Green | Holly Machin | 346 | | |
| Independent | Jane Elizabeth McCarthy | 275 | | |
| Independent | Jeffrey Stuart Sampson | 236 | | |
| Independent | Nortridge Perrott | 165 | | |
| Independent | Nigel Alan Robins | 107 | | |
| Liberal Democrats hold | | Swing | | |
| Liberal Democrats hold | | Swing | | |
| Liberal Democrats hold | | Swing | | |
| Liberal Democrats hold | | Swing | | |
| Turnout | | | 29.8 | |

=== Upper Loughor (one seat) ===
Upper Loughor 2008
| Party | Candidate | Votes | % | ±% |
|---|---|---|---|---|
| Plaid Cymru | Darren Price* | 531 | | |
| Labour | Harding John Richards | 199 | | |
| Independent | Wynford Jones | 105 | | |
| Conservative | Alan Thomas Protheroe | 89 | | |
| Plaid Cymru hold | | Swing | | |
| Turnout | | 42.7 | | |

=== West Cross (two seats) ===
West Cross 2008
| Party | Candidate | Votes | % | ±% |
|---|---|---|---|---|
| Labour | Mark Clive Child* | 1,050 | | |
| Labour | Desmond Thomas* | 1,034 | | |
| Conservative | Elaine Hughes | 894 | | |
| Conservative | Philip Joel Swinnerton | 771 | | |
| Liberal Democrats | Simon Hugh Arthur | 440 | | |
| Liberal Democrats | William Keith Jones | 377 | | |
| Green | Marion Williams | 187 | | |
| Green | Erica Georgina Powell | 144 | | |
| Labour hold | | Swing | | |
| Labour hold | | Swing | | |
| Turnout | | | | |
