= Killay South =

Coordinates: 51.61836°N 4.02360°W

Killay South Ward
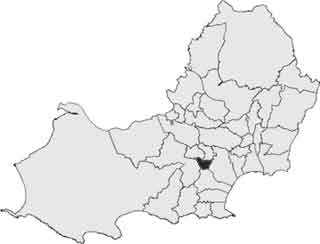
- Area: 1.24 km^{2} (0.48 sq mi)
- Population: 2,239 (2011 census)
  - Density: 1,806/km^{2} (4,680/sq mi)
- Principal area: Swansea
- Preserved county: West Glamorgan
- Country: Wales
- Sovereign state: United Kingdom
- UK Parliament: Swansea West
- Senedd Cymru – Welsh Parliament: Swansea West
- Councillors: Jeffrey William Jones (Liberal Democrats (UK))

Killay South (Welsh: Cilâ - De) was an electoral ward in the City and County of Swansea, Wales. The ward was mainly rural and consisted of some or all of the following areas: Dunvant, Ilston, Killay, Sketty and Upper Killay in the parliamentary constituency of Swansea West.

It was bounded by the wards of Dunvant and Killay North to the north; Sketty to the east; Mayals to the south; and Fairwood to the west.

== Election results ==
=== 2017 Election ===
results for the election held on 4th May 2017:

Killay South 2017
Party	Candidate	Votes	%	±%
Liberal Democrats	Jeff Jones	327	36	
Conservative	Martin Edward Quale	305	34	
Labour	Greg James	272	30	
Turnout		904	49	
Liberal Democrats hold		Swing		

=== 2012 Election ===
Results for the election held on 3rd May 2012:

Killay South 2012
Party	Candidate	Votes	%	±%
Liberal Democrats	Jeff Jones	429	49	
Labour	Peter Kenneth Jones	327	38	
Conservative	Graham Richard Coombs	111	13	
Turnout		867	44	
Liberal Democrats hold		Swing		

=== 2008 Election ===
Results for the election held on 1st May 2008:

Killay South 2008
Party	Candidate	Votes	%	±%
Liberal Democrats	Jeffrey William Jones	463		
Conservative	Martyn Ford	247		
Labour	Micheal Edward Harper	168		
Green	Peter Kenneth Jones	119		
Turnout			50.53	
Liberal Democrats hold		Swing		

=== 2004 Election ===
Results for the election held on 10th June 2004:

Killay South 2004
Party	Candidate	Votes	%	±%
Liberal Democrats	Gerald Glyn Clement	798	83	
Conservative	James Barrington Green Harding	165	17	
Turnout		963		
Liberal Democrats hold		Swing		

=== 1999 Election ===
Results for the election held on 6th May 1999:

Killay South 1999
Party	Candidate	Votes	%	±%
Liberal Democrats	Gerald Glyn Clement	790	70	
Labour	Jeffrey William Walton	203	18	
Conservative	Sarah Jane Cadogan	131	12	
Turnout		1,124		
Liberal Democrats hold		Swing		

=== 1995 Election ===
Results for the election held in 1995:

Killay South 1995
Party	Candidate	Votes	%	±%
Liberal Democrats	Gerald Glyn Clement	548	51.3	
Labour	R. Johnston	301	28.2	
Conservative	P. Williams	220	20.6	
Turnout			46.5	
Liberal Democrats win (new seat)				
