= Killay North =

Coordinates: 51.61836°N 4.02360°W

Killay North Ward
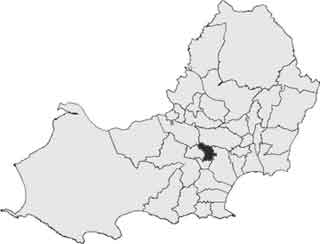
- Area: 1.99 km^{2} (0.77 sq mi)
- Population: 3,463 (2011 census)
  - Density: 1,740/km^{2} (4,500/sq mi)
- Principal area: Swansea
- Preserved county: West Glamorgan
- Country: Wales
- Sovereign state: United Kingdom
- UK Parliament: Swansea West
- Senedd Cymru – Welsh Parliament: Swansea West
- Councillors: Mary Helen Jones (Liberal Democrats (UK))

Killay North (Welsh: Cilâ - Gogledd) is a former electoral ward in the City and County of Swansea, Wales which consisted of some or all of the following areas: Killay, Olchfa and Waunarlwydd, in the parliamentary constituency of Swansea West. The village of Killay is located mainly in this ward, set high above sea level, about 3.5 miles west of Swansea city centre.

Killay North was bounded by Gowerton and Cockett to the north; Sketty to the east; Killay South to the south and Dunvant to the west.

== Election results ==
=== 2017 election ===
Results from the election held on 4th May 2017:

Killay North 2017
| Party | Candidate | Votes | % | ±% |
|---|---|---|---|---|
| Liberal Democrats | Mary Jones | 371 | 46 | −14 |
| Labour | Angela James | 184 | 23 | |
| Conservative | Denise Howard | 157 | 20 | |
| Plaid Cymru | Rhydian Fitter | 87 | 11 | |
| Turnout | | | 40.5 | |
| Liberal Democrats hold | | Swing | | |

=== 2012 election ===
Results from the election held in 2012:

Killay North 2012
| Party | Candidate | Votes | % | ±% |
|---|---|---|---|---|
| Liberal Democrats | Mary Helen Jones | 435 | | |
| Labour | Hannah Farrar | 198 | | |
| Conservative | Gareth Raymond Milne | 127 | | |
| Turnout | | | 22.66 | |
| Liberal Democrats hold | | Swing | | |

=== 2008 election ===
Results from the election held on 1st may 2008:

Killay North 2008
| Party | Candidate | Votes | % | ±% |
|---|---|---|---|---|
| Liberal Democrats | Mary Jones | 646 | 60 | |
| Conservative | Gareth Raymond Milne | 236 | 22 | |
| Labour | Jason James Sannegadu | 192 | 18 | |
| Turnout | | | 34.3 | |
| Liberal Democrats hold | | Swing | | |

=== 2004 election ===
Results from the election held on 10th June 2004

Killay North 2004
| Party | Candidate | Votes | % | ±% |
|---|---|---|---|---|
| Liberal Democrats | Mary Jones | 699 | 69 | |
| Conservative | David Nicholas Thomas | 212 | 21 | |
| Independent | Nigel Alan Robins | 103 | 10 | |
| Turnout | | | | |
| Liberal Democrats hold | | Swing | | |

=== 1999 election ===
results from the election held on 6th May 1999:

Killay North 1999
| Party | Candidate | Votes | % | ±% |
|---|---|---|---|---|
| Liberal Democrats | Mary Jones | 396 | 28 | |
| Labour | Perry Stephen Buck | 348 | 24 | |
| Independent | George Smith Gunn | 292 | 20 | |
| Independent | Stuart James Rice | 230 | 16 | |
| Conservative | Philip David Hellwell | 167 | 12 | |
| Turnout | | | | |
| Liberal Democrats gain from Labour | | Swing | | |

=== 1995 election ===
Results from the election held in 1995:

Killay North 1995
| Party | Candidate | Votes | % | ±% |
|---|---|---|---|---|
| Labour | P. Buck | 507 | 40.7 | |
| Conservative | G. Gunn | 409 | 32.8 | |
| Liberal Democrats | MS P. Bushell | 331 | 26.5 | |
| Turnout | | | | |
| Labour win (new seat) | | | | |
