= Welsh Coast Radio =

- Swansea (Tircoed Forest Village); United Kingdom
- Broadcast area: Tircoed, Penllergaer, Pontardulais, Gorseinon, Pontlliw and surrounding areas
- Frequencies: 106.5 MHz, Online
- Branding: For Swansea, For South Wales

Programming
- Languages: English, Welsh
- Format: Community Adult Contemporary

Ownership
- Owner: Tircoed Village Trust

History
- Founded: 2005
- First air date: 14 July 2007
- Former names: Radio Tircoed; SA Radio Live

Technical information
- Transmitter coordinates: 51.682102821550465°N 3.997469606380462°W

Links
- Webcast: Listen Live
- Website: Website

Welsh Coast Radio is a community radio station serving Tircoed, Penllergaer, Pontardulais, Gorseinon, Pontlliw and surrounding areas in the north and east of the City and County of Swansea, Wales.

The station, originally known as Radio Tircoed, broadcasts from studios at the Tircoed Village Hall.

It was founded in 2005 as a restricted service licence (RSL) station, transmitting on 106.5FM, 365 days a year.

== Programming ==
Programming output varies throughout the day with various music-led, talk and feature programmes alongside specialist output in the evenings and at weekends, sports coverage and weekly bilingual programmes in Welsh/English. The majority of the station's output is locally produced and presented, although some late-night programming is syndicated.

Presenters Include:

- Chris Smith “Smithy” - Steve Dewitt - Mike Kennedy - Steve Manley - Rob Pendry - Plastic Sam - Roy Davies - Andy Boyt - Clare-Anna Mitchell - Nathan Watters - Alex Tomuta - Cari Evans - Dave O’Rourke - Lady Kathy and Producer Dom - 'Big' Jim Hussell - Janet Francis-Jones - Steve Manley - Eileen Boyt - Jim Laws - Rhianedd Collins - Dennis Whitehead - Mark 'Fordy' Ford - Barrie Lewis - Martyn Kelly - Keith Milward - Mark Langdon - Lucy Sparks - John Grenfell - Karl Burtonshaw - Leighton Jones - Tim Cooper - Griff Harries - Mike Menner - Ken and MJ Rundel - Aaron Badgley and Tony Stewart - Richard Latto

== Rebranding ==
On 10 June 2024, it was announced that Radio Tircoed would be rebranded and relaunched as Swansea Live Radio on 30 September. However, after complaints from rival broadcasters about the choice of name, on 18 June, it was announced the station would rebrand as SA Radio Live.

The station rebrand took place at 7am on 30 September 2024, to coincide with the 50th anniversary of the launch of Swansea Sound - with many of the station's launch line-up consisting of former presenters from the commercial station.

On 17 June 2025, the SA Radio Live brand and format was discontinued, citing a lack of revenue, although the station continued to broadcast.

On 7 July 2025, the station rebranded again to Welsh Coast Radio.
