= Pontlliw and Tircoed =

Coordinates: 51.6902°N 4.0120°W

- Community
- Principal area: Swansea
- Country: Wales
- Sovereign state: United Kingdom
- Police: South Wales
- Fire: Mid and West Wales
- Ambulance: Welsh
- List of places UK Wales Swansea Map of the community

Pontlliw and Tircoed is a community and electoral ward in the north of the City and County of Swansea, Wales. It includes the villages of Pontlliw and Tircoed.

According to the 2011 UK Census Pontlliw and Tircoed had a population of 2,529.

== Governance ==
The community has a Community Council which comprises ten unpaid community councillors from the two villages.

Until 2022 Pontlliw and Tircoed was covered by the Llangyfelach electoral ward for elections to the City and County of Swansea Council. Following a local government boundary review, Pontlliw and Tircoed was separated to become its own electoral ward. The ward elects one county councillor.

2022 Swansea Council election
Party	Candidate	Votes	%	±%
Labour	Victoria Holland	450		
Independent	Byron Lewis	424		
Labour win (new seat)				
