= Tircoed forest village =

Suburb of Swansea, Wales

Coordinates: 51.68168°N 3.99885°W

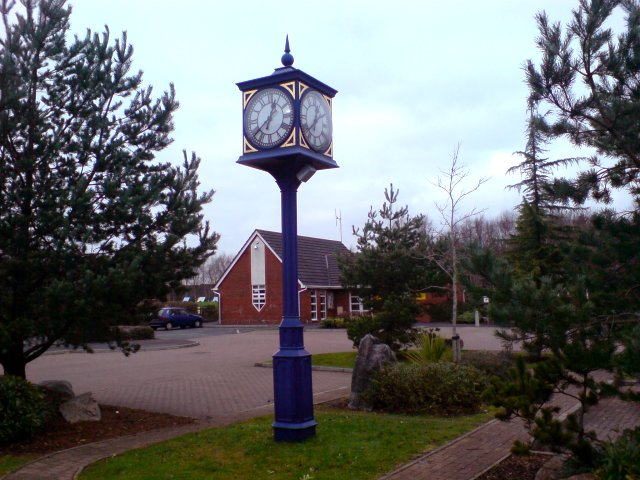
Tircoed Community Centre

Tircoed forest village is a suburb between the villages of Penllergaer and Pontlliw, Swansea, Wales. It is part of the Pontlliw and Tircoed community.

Built from the late 1980s onwards, Tircoed currently consists of 470 houses clustered around a village hall, pond and green, accessible from the A48 via a 1/2-mile-long (0.80 km) road. There is a convenience store and the village is within walking distance of Moto Services Swansea.

The village has its own local community radio station, originally Radio Tircoed, in 2025 rebranded as Welsh Coast Radio.

The population in 2011 was around 884 people.

The village is located in the Pontlliw and Tircoed electoral ward of Swansea.
