= Uplands (electoral ward) =

Coordinates: 51.61934°N 3.96586°W

Uplands Ward
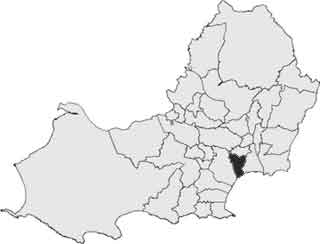
- Area: 2.31 km^{2} (0.89 sq mi)
- Population: 15,665 (2011 census)
  - Density: 6,781/km^{2} (17,560/sq mi)
- Principal area: Swansea
- Preserved county: West Glamorgan
- Country: Wales
- Sovereign state: United Kingdom
- UK Parliament: Swansea West
- Senedd Cymru – Welsh Parliament: Swansea West
- Councillors: Peter May (Uplands Party); Sandra Joy (Lib Dem); Stuart Rice (Uplands Party); Allan Jeffery (Lib Dem)

Uplands is name of an electoral ward coterminous with the community of Uplands, in the City and County of Swansea, Wales, UK.

== Description ==
The electoral ward consists of some or all of the following areas: Uplands, Brynmill, St. Helen's, Cwmgwyn, Ffynone, and The Lons. It is in the parliamentary constituency of Swansea West. The ward is bounded by the Sketty ward to the west, Townhill to the north, Castle and Waterfront to the east and the sea (Swansea Bay) to the south.

For electoral purposes Uplands is divided into the polling districts of: WU Uplands North, WV Glanmor, WW Ffynone, WX St. Helens, WY Brynmill and WZ Uplands South.

Uplands returns four councillors to the local City and County of Swansea Council.

== Uplands Party ==
The Uplands Party was formed in 2016 to contest local elections in the Uplands ward. It was founded by Peter May, who had previously stood as an independent candidate and as a Liberal Democrat. The Uplands Party campaigns on issues local to the ward, such as street cleaning and houses of multiple occupation, and avoids national politics. It won two of the four Uplands seats in May 2017 and all four seats at the May 2022 elections.

== Local election results ==
=== 2022 Swansea council elections ===
The Uplands Party won all four seats at the 2022 election, taking an additional two seats from Labour. This was despite one of the Uplands Party candidates, Allan Jeffery, suffering a heart attack whilst out campaigning and being hospitalised for the election result.

Since the 2022 election two Uplands Party Councillors - Alan Jeffery and Sandra Joy - have defected to the Liberal Democrats.

=== 2017 Swansea council elections ===
Uplands was identified as one of the key battlegrounds in the May 2017 council elections. Previously held by the Labour Party, it was predicted to become a multi-party ward, with challengers from the Uplands Party, including sitting councillor Peter May.

=== 2014 by-election ===
Following the resignation of Pearleen Sangha in late September 2014, a by-election was called for the fourth seat in the ward. The Independent politician Peter May was elected with 32.8% of the vote.

Swansea City Council By Election, 20 November 2014
Party	Candidate	Votes	%	±%
Independent	Peter May	671	32.8	
Labour	Fran Griffiths	533	26.1	
Liberal Democrats	Janet Thomas	215	10.5	
Green	Ashley Wakeling	179	8.8	
Independent	Pat Dwan	158	7.7	
Conservative	Josh Allard	154	7.5	
Plaid Cymru	Rhydian Fitter	104	5.1	
TUSC	Ronnie Job	31	1.5	
Majority		138	6.7	
Turnout		2,045		

=== 2012 Swansea council elections ===
The councillors elected in May 2012 were: Nick Davies, John Charles Bayliss, Neil Ronconi-Woollard and Pearleen Sangha, all of whom represent the Wales Labour Party. The results were:

Uplands 2012
Party	Candidate	Votes	%	±%
Labour	Nick Davies	1,302		
Labour	John Bayliss	1,207		
Labour	Neil Ronconi-Woollard	1,161		
Labour	Pearleen Sangha	1,099		
Liberal Democrats	Peter May*	1,089		
Liberal Democrats	Stuart Rice*	975		
Liberal Democrats	Janet Thomas*	812		
Liberal Democrats	Jayne Woodman*	782		
Green	Keith Ross	614		
Green	Andrew Smith	465		
Conservative	Millie Balkan	319		
Conservative	Christian Bickerstaff	313		
Conservative	Thomas Giffard	306		
Conservative	Sarah Bickerstaff	301		

=== 2008 Swansea council elections ===
In the 2008 local elections for Uplands, there were 20 candidates, each contesting for one of 4 seats in the Uplands. Candidates were fielded by the Conservatives, Labour and Plaid Cymru. All four current Liberal Democrat councillors sought re-election. Four of the candidates sought votes for just one issue - the Slip Bridge. The "Slip Bridge four" who are not party affiliated were campaigning for the reinstatement of a bridge crossing at the Slip and wider issues of preserving Swansea's green spaces and heritage.

The turnout for the 2008 elections for Uplands was 29.83%. The results were:

Candidate	Party	Votes	Status
Peter May	Liberal Democrats	1828	Liberal Democrats hold
Stuart Rice	Liberal Democrats	1706	Liberal Democrats hold
Jayne Woodman	Liberal Democrats	1495	Liberal Democrats hold
Janet Thomas	Liberal Democrats	1488	Liberal Democrats hold
Sybil Crouch	Labour	817	
Andrew Connell	Labour	792	
Ian Ross	Labour	765	
Derek James	Labour	729	
Dick Phillips	Conservative	593	
Andrew Smith	Green Party	561	
Simon Bright	Conservative	500	
David Rodway	Conservative	472	
Annest Wiliam	Plaid Cymru	404	
Norman Whitlock	Conservative	403	
Steven Clegg	Green Party	391	
Holly Machin	Green Party	346	
Jane McCarthy	Non-Aligned	275	
Jeffrey Sampson	Non-Aligned	236	
Nortridge Perrott	Non-Aligned	165	
Nigel Robins	Non-Aligned	107	
