= Cockett (electoral ward) =

Electoral ward in Wales

Coordinates: 51.63707°N 3.98107°W

Cockett Ward
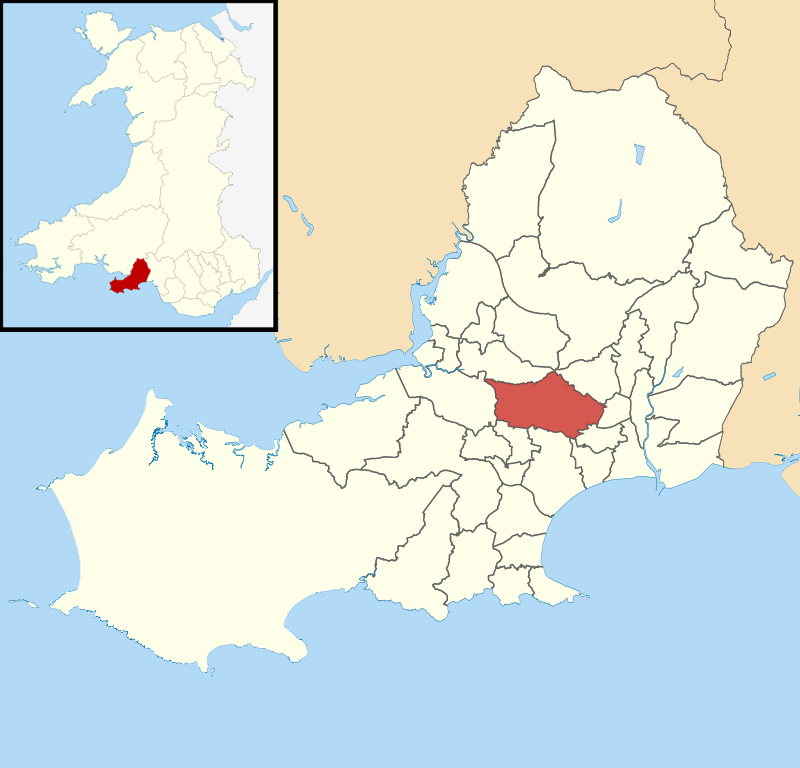
- Location of pre-2022 Cockett ward within the City and County of Swansea
- Area: 8.59 km^{2} (3.32 sq mi)
- Population: 13,362 (2011 census)
  - Density: 1,556/km^{2} (4,030/sq mi)
- Principal area: Swansea
- Preserved county: West Glamorgan
- Country: Wales
- Sovereign state: United Kingdom
- UK Parliament: Swansea West
- Senedd Cymru – Welsh Parliament: Gŵyr Abertawe

Cockett (Welsh: Coced) is an electoral ward in the City and County of Swansea, Wales, UK. The ward is coterminous with the Cockett community. It elects three councillors.

The electoral ward consists of some or all of the following areas: Cadle, Cwmdu, Coedweig, Gendros, Gors, Fforestfach and Cockett, in the parliamentary constituency of Swansea West. The ward is bounded by the wards of Kingsbridge and Penderry to the north; Cwmbwrla to the east; Townhill to the south east; Sketty and Killay North to the south; and Gowerton to the west.

Following a local government boundary review, effective from the 2022 local elections, Waunarlwydd was removed from the Cockett ward to become its own ward (and community). As a result, the number of councillors elected in Cockett reduced from four to three.

== Local Council Elections ==
=== 2022 ===
Turnout for the 2022 local election was 27.7%.

Cockett 2022
| Party | Candidate | Votes | % | ±% |
|---|---|---|---|---|
| Labour | Mike Durke | 1,414 | | |
| Labour | Oliver James | 1,378 | | |
| Labour | Elliott King | 1,310 | | |
| Green | Marie Greaves | 408 | | |
| Liberal Democrats | Vivienne Samuel | 395 | | |
| Conservative | Steve Norman | 394 | | |
| Liberal Democrats | Rhian Russell | 318 | | |
| Freedom Alliance | Kim Brooker | 167 | | |
| Labour hold | | Swing | | |
| Labour hold | | Swing | | |
| Labour hold | | Swing | | |

=== 2017 ===
Turnout for the 2017 local election was 32.73%.

| Candidate | Party | Votes |
|---|---|---|
| Mike Durke | Labour | 1839 |
| Wendy Lewis | Labour | 1792 |
| Oliver James | Labour | 1714 |
| Elliott King | Labour | 1528 |
| Keith Hedges | Conservative | 791 |
| Deidre Lomer-Hedges | Conservative | 721 |
| Jack Powell | Conservative | 674 |
| Jack Huang | Conservative | 622 |

=== 2015 by-election ===
The 2015 by-election results were announced alongside the 2015 UK General Election results, in the Swansea Maritime Quarter. The turnout was 6253 out of 10528 registered electors, i.e. 59.4%: almost double the 2012 turnout.

The results were:

| Candidate | Party | Votes | Share | Status |
|---|---|---|---|---|
| Elliott King | Welsh Labour | 2741 | 44% | Elected |
| David Lloyd | Plaid Cymru | 1345 | 22% | |
| Rebecca Singh | Welsh Conservative Party Candidate | 899 | 14% | |
| Nicola Holley | Welsh Liberal Democrats | 776 | 12% | |
| Mike Whittal | Green Party | 314 | 5% | |
| Dave Phillips | Trade Unionist and Socialist Coalition | 128 | 2% | |
| Spoilt votes | | 50 | 1% | |
| Total | | 6253 | | |

=== 2012 ===
The turnout for Cockett in the 2012 local council elections was 32.89%. The results were:

| Candidate | Party | Votes | Status |
|---|---|---|---|
| Ann Cook | Labour | 1949 | Labour gain |
| Andrew Jones | Labour | 1913 | Labour gain |
| Geraint Owens | Labour | 1707 | Labour gain |
| Mitchell Theaker | Labour | 1601 | Labour gain |
| Dai Lloyd | Plaid Cymru | 895 | |
| Nicola Holley | Liberal Democrat | 728 | |
| Keith Morgan | Liberal Democrat | 723 | |
| Jim Kelleher | Liberal Democrat | 637 | |
| Hazel Morgan | Liberal Democrat | 580 | |
| Patricia Sanderson | Plaid Cymru | 533 | |
| Vanessa Webb | Plaid Cymru | 498 | |
| Rhodri Thomas | Plaid Cymru | 484 | |
| Veronyca Hughes | Independent | 248 | |
| Matthew Johnson | Conservatives | 192 | |
| Liam Kelly | Conservatives | 166 | |
| Victoria Steventon | Conservatives | 155 | |
| Michael Overthrow | Conservatives | 154 | |

=== 1999 ===
In 1999, Dr Dai Lloyd, who had captured a seat from Labour at a by-election topped the poll and Plaid Cymru also captured a second seat.

Cockett 1999
| Party | Candidate | Votes | % | ±% |
|---|---|---|---|---|
| Plaid Cymru | David Lloyd* | 2,366 | | |
| Labour | Lilian Hopkin* | 1,902 | | |
| Plaid Cymru | William Morgan | 1,581 | | |
| Labour | Victor Alexander* | 1,528 | | |
| Plaid Cymru | Adrian Rees | 1,478 | | |
| Plaid Cymru | Nicholas Walsh | 1,381 | | |
| Labour | Ann Pennock | 1,343 | | |
| Labour | Clive Morgan | 1,231 | | |
| Liberal Democrats | Tudor Donne | 639 | | |
| Plaid Cymru hold | | Swing | | |
| Labour hold | | Swing | | |
| Plaid Cymru gain from Labour | | Swing | | |
| Labour hold | | Swing | | |

=== 1995 ===
The first election to the new unitary City and County of Swansea Council took place in 1995. All four seats were won by Labour although the Plaid Cymru candidate, local GP Dai Lloyd also polled strongly.

Cockett 1995
| Party | Candidate | Votes | % | ±% |
|---|---|---|---|---|
| Labour | Lilian Hopkin | 2,414 | | |
| Labour | Victor Alexander | 2,194 | | |
| Labour | David Anthony | 2,104 | | |
| Labour | Denzil Porter | 1,953 | | |
| Plaid Cymru | David Lloyd | 1,240 | | |
| Liberal Democrats | Stuart Ball | 458 | | |
| Liberal Democrats | Ken Shingleton | 411 | | |
| Liberal Democrats | Philip Stanford | 409 | | |
| Liberal Democrats | Arthur Westwood | 316 | | |
| Conservative | Timothy Phillips | 286 | | |
| Labour win (new seat) | | | | |
| Labour win (new seat) | | | | |
| Labour win (new seat) | | | | |
| Labour win (new seat) | | | | |

== Districts of Cockett ==
The suburb of Cockett is a residential area in the ward.

The suburb of Fforestfach lies immediately north of the suburb of Cockett.
