= Llangyfelach (electoral ward) =

Coordinates: 51.67350°N 3.95374°W

Llangyfelach Ward
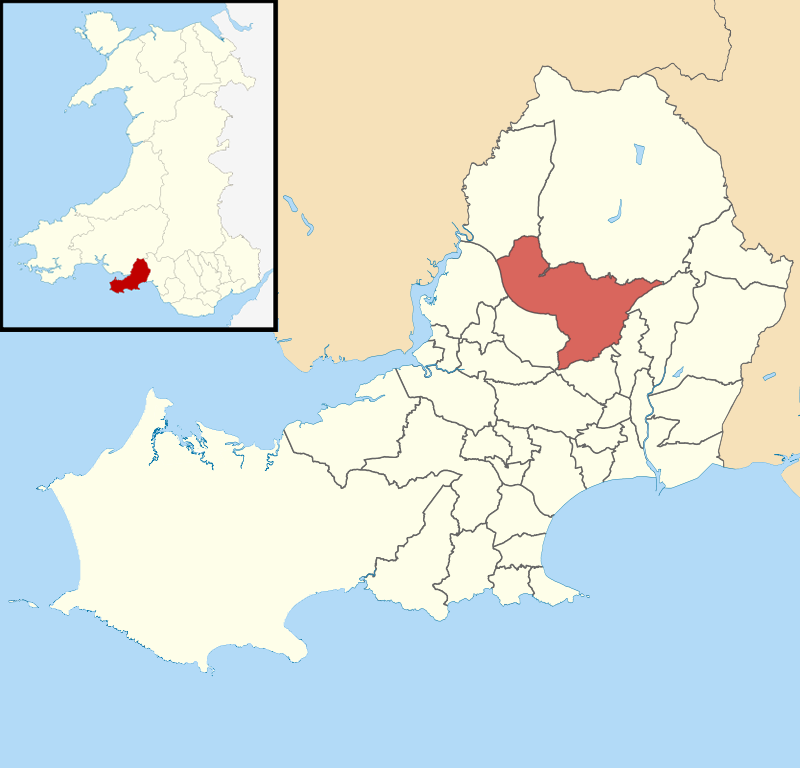
- Location of pre-2022 Llangyfelach ward within the City and County of Swansea
- Area: 17.12 km^{2} (6.61 sq mi)
- Population: 5,039 (2011 census)
  - Density: 294/km^{2} (760/sq mi)
- Principal area: Swansea
- Preserved county: West Glamorgan
- Country: Wales
- Sovereign state: United Kingdom
- UK Parliament: Gower
- Senedd Cymru – Welsh Parliament: Gŵyr Abertawe
- Councillors: Mark Tribe (Independent)

Llangyfelach is an electoral ward in the county of Swansea, Wales, UK. It covers the communities of Llangyfelach and part of Mawr.

The electoral ward consists of some or all of the following settlements: Llangyfelach, Pantlasau, Treboeth and Felindre, in the parliamentary constituency of Gower. The ward is bounded by the ward of Clydach to the east; Morriston, Mynydd-Bach and Penderry to the south east; Pontarddulais to te west; Pontlliw and Tircoed and Penllergaer to the south west.

== 2022 ward boundary changes ==
Following a local government boundary review the Llangyfelach ward significantly increased in size. Though it lost Pontlliw and Tircoed (which together became a new ward) it gained the community ward of Felindre from the former Mawr ward (which was disbanded).

== Local election results ==
At the May 2022 local council elections, the turnout for Llangyfelach increased to 50.28%, with independent candidate Mark Tribe winning the election for the Independents@Swansea group:

Candidate	Party	Votes	Status
Mark Tribe	Independent	750	Independent hold
Robert Marshall	Labour	259	
Euan Renesto	Conservative	78	
Adrian Roberts	Green	51	

For the May 2012 local council elections, the turnout for Llangyfelach was 29.93%. The election results were:

Candidate	Party	Votes	Status
Gareth Sullivan	Independent	776	Independent hold
Richard Simpson	Labour	344	
John Edward Rasbridge	Green Party	72	
