= Dunvant and Killay =

Coordinates: 51.62710°N 4.03843°W

- Area: 5.64 km^{2} (2.18 sq mi)
- Population: 10,085 (2011 census)
  - Density: 1,788/km^{2} (4,630/sq mi)
- Principal area: Swansea
- Preserved county: West Glamorgan
- Country: Wales
- Sovereign state: United Kingdom
- UK Parliament: Swansea West
- Senedd Cymru – Welsh Parliament: Gŵyr Abertawe
- Councillors: Mary Helen Jones (Liberal Democrats (UK)); Jeff Jones (Liberal Democrats (UK)); Louise Gibbard (Labour)

Dunvant and Killay, formerly Dunvant (Welsh: Dyfnant), is an electoral ward in the City and County of Swansea, Wales, UK. It is named after the village of Dunvant and neighbouring Killay, which lie within the ward.

The electoral ward consisted of some or all of the following areas, Derlwyn, Dunvant, Killay, in the parliamentary constituency of Swansea West. It is bounded by Fairwood to the west; Gowerton to the north; Sketty to the east.

== 2022 boundary changes ==
Until 2022, Dunvant and Killay consisted of three wards: Dunvant represented by two councillors; Killay North and Killay South represented by one councillor each. Following a local authority ward boundary review, the three wards were merged to become 'Dunvant and Killay', with an overall reduction in councillors to three. A local petition to oppose the changes was unsuccessful.

== 2012 Swansea Council election ==
In the 2012 local council elections the turnout for Dunvant was 38.94%. The results were:

| Candidate | Party | Votes | Status |
|---|---|---|---|
| John Newbury | Liberal Democrats | 575 | Liberal Democrats hold |
| Jennifer Raynor | Labour | 420 | Labour gain |
| Mick Harper | Labour | 354 | |
| Nick Tregoning | Independent | 351 | |
| Graham Isted | Liberal Democrat | 302 | |
| Dee May | Kintessack Elite | 231 | |
| Lis Davies | Independent | 213 | |
| Jordan Slater | Conservatives | 100 | |
| Robert Dowdle | Conservatives | 89 | |
