= Fairwood, Swansea =

Coordinates: 51.62659°N 4.06731°W

Fairwood Ward
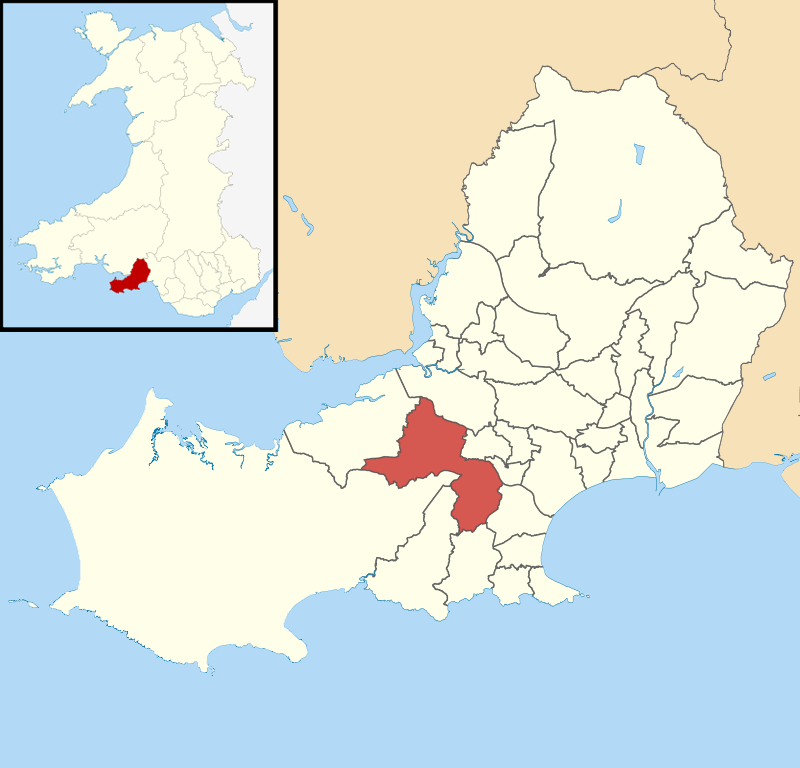
- Location of Fairwood within the City and County of Swansea
- Area: 13.44 km^{2} (5.19 sq mi)
- Population: 2,914 (2011 census)
  - Density: 217/km^{2} (560/sq mi)
- Principal area: Swansea
- Preserved county: West Glamorgan
- Country: Wales
- Sovereign state: United Kingdom
- UK Parliament: Gower
- Senedd Cymru – Welsh Parliament: Gŵyr Abertawe
- Councillors: Beth Rowe (Welsh Liberal Democrats)

The electoral ward of Fairwood, City and County of Swansea, Wales, UK consists of some or all of the following areas: Dunvant, Upper Killay, Poundffald and Three Crosses in the parliamentary constituency of Gower.

The ward is bounded by the wards of Gower and Pennard to the south west; Penclawdd to the north west; Gowerton to the north east; Dunvant and Killay to the east; Mayals to the south west and Bishopston to the south.

The village of Upper Killay is located in the Fairwood ward about 3.5 miles west of Swansea City Centre.

== Local council elections ==
In the Swansea local council elections for 2012, the voter turnout in Fairwood was 49.72%. The results of voting were:

Candidate	Party	Votes	Status
Paxton Richard Hood-Williams	Conservative	583	Conservative hold
John Bushell	Liberal Democrats	317	
Mike Durke	Labour	247	

The Conservatives held the Fairwood ward between 1995 and 2026. Following the death of Paxton Hood-Williams in 2026, a by-election was held in the Fairwood ward and Beth Rowe of the Welsh Liberal Democrats was elected.
