= Penderry =

Coordinates: 51.65529°N 3.96741°W

- Area: 4.04 km^{2} (1.56 sq mi)
- Population: 12,119 (2011 census)
  - Density: 3,000/km^{2} (7,800/sq mi)
- Principal area: Swansea
- Preserved county: West Glamorgan
- Country: Wales
- Sovereign state: United Kingdom
- Police: South Wales
- Fire: Mid and West Wales
- Ambulance: Welsh
- UK Parliament: Swansea East
- Senedd Cymru – Welsh Parliament: Swansea East
- Councillors: Terry Hennegan (Labour); June Elizabeth Burtonshaw (Labour); Hazel Mary Morris (Labour)
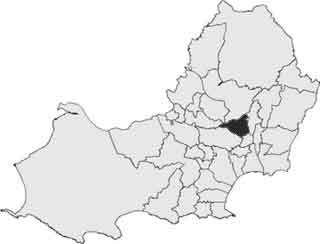
- List of places UK Wales Swansea

Penderry (Welsh: Penderi) is a community and an electoral ward in the City and County of Swansea, Wales. Penderry does not have a community council.

Penderry is bordered by the wards of Mynydd-Bach to the east; Cockett and Cwmbwrla to the south; and Kingsbridge, Penllergaer and Llangyfelach to the north.

For the purposes of local council elections, the ward is divided up into a number of polling districts, which are: Blaen-y-Maes, Caereithin, Mynydd Cadle, Penlan West, Penlan East and Clwyd.

Penderry returns three councillors to the local council. The current councillors representing Penderry are: June Burtonshaw (Labour), Doreen Jones (Labour) and Grenville Phillips (Labour).

The electoral ward consists of some or all of the following geographical areas: Penlan, Portmead, Blaen-y-Maes, Fforesthall, Caereithin and Tre-boeth, in the parliamentary constituency of Swansea East. The ward consists of mainly suburban residential areas.

== 2012 local council elections ==
The turnout for the 2012 local council elections in Penderry was 22.23%. The results were:

Candidate	Party	Votes	Status
Terry Hennegan	Labour	1216	Labour hold
June Elizabeth Burtonshaw	Labour	1182	Labour hold
Hazel Mary Morris	Labour	1092	Labour hold
James Anthony Young	Green Party	470	

== Districts ==
=== Penlan ===
Penlan is the largest area in the centre of the ward.

=== Blaen-y-Maes ===
Blaen-y-Maes is an area to the west of the ward.

=== Treboeth & Mynydd-bach ===
A small section of Treboeth and Mynydd-Bach falls towards the North the Penderry Electoral Ward.

The split for Mynydd-Bach is on Heol Ddu from the junction of Clos Ddu which continues to split along neighbouring Roger Street in Treboeth along the junction with Crwys Terrace.
