= Sketty (electoral ward) =

Coordinates: 51.61886°N 3.99473°W

Sketty Ward
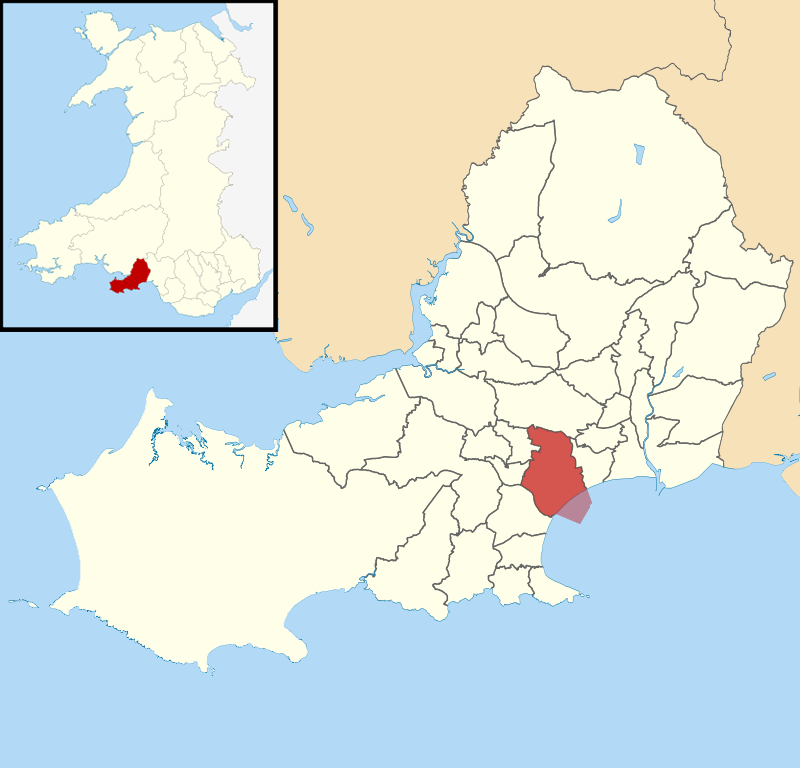
- Location of Sketty ward within the City and County of Swansea
- Area: 6.87 km^{2} (2.65 sq mi)
- Population: 14,301 (2011 census)
  - Density: 2,082/km^{2} (5,390/sq mi)
- Principal area: Swansea
- Preserved county: West Glamorgan
- Country: Wales
- Sovereign state: United Kingdom
- UK Parliament: Swansea West
- Senedd Cymru – Welsh Parliament: Gŵyr Abertawe
- Councillors: Rosina June Stanton (Liberal Democrats (UK)); Arthur Michael Day (Liberal Democrats (UK)); Huw Rees (Liberal Democrats (UK)); Cheryl Lynne Philpott (Liberal Democrats (UK)); Paul Michael Meara (Liberal Democrats (UK))

Sketty (Welsh: Sgeti) is an electoral ward (coterminous with the Sketty community and suburb) in the City and County of Swansea, Wales, UK. The electoral ward is coterminous with the community.

== Description ==
It is bounded to the following wards: north by Cockett, east by Uplands, south by the coast, southwest by Mayals and west by Killay North and Killay South.

The electoral ward is divided into a number of polling districts by the City and County of Swansea. They are Tycoch, Sketty Park, Vivian Road, Sketty Green, Derwen Fawr, Gwerneinon. It is the largest ward in the UK Parliament and Welsh Assembly Swansea West.

Due to the large size of Sketty, there are recognisable sub-divisions of Sketty. Whilst the boundaries used for electoral or postal purposes are clearly defined, although they do not always correspond, in the public mind the boundaries are not totally clear. Indeed, many residents of some of the sub-divisions would describe themselves as a residents of the sub-division rather than use the term Sketty. Indeed, residents of the western part of the Uplands would consider their vicinity as part of "Sketty", as indeed would the post office.

== History ==
Sketty first became an electoral ward in the late nineteenth century with the formation of Glamorgan County Council. The first county councillor to be elected in 1889 was the Liberal, John Powell. He was succeeded by Sir Robert Morris.

== Politics ==
The Sketty Ward is the largest in the Swansea West Parliamentary/ Welsh Assembly Constituency, and is one of only two five member wards for the purposes of City and County of Swansea Elections. This single ward five member structure allows the electorate to vote for up to five candidates, and electors are free to either put all their votes behind one party or to split their vote between parties.

The three main UK-wide parties seem to have reasonable local infrastructures in the area, and have contested the vast majority of seats since the first elections to the City and County of Swansea authority in 1995. The Conservative Party, which only contested four out of five seats in 1999, is an exception. A defeated independent candidate in those elections then stood, and won, as an official Conservative candidate in a 2000 by-election. Plaid Cymru, whilst it has not contested every seat, contests every election. There have in the past been a small number of non-party candidates, and in the 2004 elections the Green Party also put up a full slate of five candidates.

The area has seen considerable electoral volatility, and there appears to be evidence of split ticket voting. Whilst party factors remain strong, there seems to be evidence of voters taking into account other factors, such as personality and perhaps geographic factors due to the size of the ward. In recent elections, (post 1995) whilst there is evidence of considerable voting shifts between parties, no party has ever had the ignominy of its vote completely collapsing, and the area has seen some hotly contested local elections.

In 1995, the ward elected four councillors. This election was a "mid-term election" towards the end of the Conservative period in Government. Labour won three seats, and an Independent candidate won one. The Independent councillor later joined the Liberal Democrats. These elections were probably the worst for the Conservative Party in the area, and the best for Labour.

In 1999, the ward elected five councillors. This election was held the same day as the first elections to the National Assembly for Wales, and was set against a controversial backdrop concerning a Welsh Labour leadership election, and the Labour vote predictably suffered. The results were the most eclectic seen. The Conservatives won two seats, the Liberal Democrats also won two seats and Labour won one.

In 2000, there was a by-election caused by the death of the Labour Councillor. The seat was then won by the Conservatives. This election confirmed the previous year's re-emergence of the Conservatives, although of course this election took place on a lower turnout than the other elections.

In 2004, the ward again elected five councillors. These elections were set against the national backdrop of a controversial war in Iraq, and the local backdrop of the closure of Swansea Leisure Centre. These elections saw Labour lose control, and a coalition of Liberal Democrats, Conservatives, and independents take control of Swansea Council, the main local issue at the time was a planning issue concerning a proposed ASDA store in Derwen Fawr; however, there was little if any dispute between the parties on this matter. In Sketty, the Conservatives won two seats and the Liberal Democrats won three. In 2007, one of the two conservative councillors became an Independent when the Conservastive group left the ruling coalition. He joined the Liberal Democrats in 2008.

== 2008 local council elections ==
In the 2004 elections, Sketty returned two conservatives and three Liberal Democrat councillors. One of the Conservative councillors defected to the independents then became a Welsh Liberal Democrat. In the 2008 local council elections, Paul Meara of the Liberal Democrats ousted the sitting Conservative councillor Tony Lloyd. It was a clean sweep for the Liberal Democrats in the ward. The results were:

Candidate	Party	Votes	Status
Rosina June Stanton	Liberal Democrats	2604	Liberal Democrats hold
Arthur Michael Day	Liberal Democrats	2201	Liberal Democrats hold
Huw Rees	Liberal Democrats	2084	Liberal Democrats gain
Cheryl Lynne Philpott	Liberal Democrats	2076	Liberal Democrats hold
Paul Michael Meara	Liberal Democrats	1601	Liberal Democrats gain
Anthony Trevor Lloyd	Conservatives	1593	
Lavinia Gay Mitchell	Conservatives	1443	
David William Helliwell	Conservatives	1347	
Alice Christina Sumner	Conservatives	1340	
Robert Thornton Dowdle	Conservatives	1126	
Ian Anthony James	Labour	888	
Jennifer Louise White	Labour	723	
James Harwood White	Labour	705	
Sian Thomas	Plaid Cymru	693	
Ashaa Rasul Iftikhar	Labour	686	
Yvonne Veronica Jardine	Labour	666	
Patricia Emma Helena Jones	Green Party	599	

== See also ==
- Hendrefoilan, a village overlapping the communities of Sketty and Killay
- Singleton Park, the main park in Sketty
