= List of places along the Wales Coast Path =

This is a list of cities, towns, villages and hamlets on or near the Wales Coast Path, a long-distance walk which follows the coast of Wales from Chepstow to Chester. It is divided into sections corresponding to those used to market and promote the route.

Column 1 lists the settlements, column 2 shows in which administrative community the settlement is located and column 3 the principal area in which it is to be found.

== South Wales Coast and Severn Estuary Coastal section ==
From Chepstow west to Kenfig.

Town or village	Community	Unitary authority	OS Explorer map	OS Grid ref.
Chepstow	Chepstow	Monmouthshire	OL14
Mathern	Mathern	Monmouthshire	OL14
Portskewett	Portskewett	Monmouthshire	154
Sudbrook	Portskewett	Monmouthshire	154
Caldicot	Caldicot	Monmouthshire	154
Rogiet	Rogiet	Monmouthshire	154
Undy	Magor with Undy	Monmouthshire	154
Magor	Magor with Undy	Monmouthshire	154
Redwick	Redwick	Newport	152/154
Whitson	Goldcliff	Newport	152
Goldcliff	Goldcliff	Newport	152
Nash	Nash	Newport	152
Newport	Newport	Newport	152
Pillgwenlly	Pillgwenlly	Newport	152
Maesglas	Gaer	Newport	152
Duffryn	Tredegar Park	Newport	152
St Brides Wentlooge	Wentlooge	Newport	152
Peterstone Wentlooge	Wentlooge	Newport	152
Newton	Trowbridge	Cardiff	151/152
Rumney	Rumney	Cardiff	151/152
Pengam	Splott	Cardiff	151/152
Pengam Moors	Splott	Cardiff	151/152
East Moors	Splott	Cardiff	151
Atlantic Wharf	Butetown	Cardiff	151
Cardiff	Castle and various others	Cardiff	151
Butetown	Butetown	Cardiff	151
Grangetown	Grangetown	Cardiff	151
Cardiff West Moors	Grangetown	Cardiff	151
Penarth	Penarth	Vale of Glamorgan	151
Lower Penarth	Penarth	Vale of Glamorgan	151
Cosmeston	Sully	Vale of Glamorgan	151
Lavernock	Sully	Vale of Glamorgan	151
Swanbridge	Sully	Vale of Glamorgan	151
Sully	Sully	Vale of Glamorgan	151
Barry	Barry	Vale of Glamorgan	151
Palmerstown	Barry	Vale of Glamorgan	151
Barry Island	Barry	Vale of Glamorgan	151
Porthkerry	Rhoose	Vale of Glamorgan	151
Rhoose	Rhoose	Vale of Glamorgan	151
Font-y-gary	Rhoose	Vale of Glamorgan	151
East Aberthaw	Rhoose	Vale of Glamorgan	151
West Aberthaw	St Athan	Vale of Glamorgan	151
Gileston	St Athan	Vale of Glamorgan	151
Boverton	Llantwit Major	Vale of Glamorgan	151
Llantwit Major	Llantwit Major	Vale of Glamorgan	151
St Donats	St Donats	Vale of Glamorgan	151
Marcross	St Donats	Vale of Glamorgan	151
Monknash	St Donats	Vale of Glamorgan	151
Broughton	Wick	Vale of Glamorgan	151
Wick	Wick	Vale of Glamorgan	151
St Brides Major	St Brides Major (community)	Vale of Glamorgan	151
Southerndown	St Brides Major (community)	Vale of Glamorgan	151
Ogmore-by-Sea	St Brides Major (community)	Vale of Glamorgan	151
Ogmore	St Brides Major (community)	Vale of Glamorgan	151
Merthyr Mawr	Merthyr Mawr	Bridgend	151
Wig Fach	Porthcawl	Bridgend	151
Newton	Porthcawl	Bridgend	151
Porthcawl	Porthcawl	Bridgend	151
Kenfig	Cornelly	Bridgend	151/165
Mawdlam	Cornelly	Bridgend	151/165

== Gower and Swansea Bay Coast section ==
From Kenfig west around Swansea Bay and the Gower Peninsula to Loughor.

Town or village	Community	Unitary authority	OS Explorer map	OS Grid ref.
Margam	Margam Moors	Neath Port Talbot	165
Margam	Margam	Neath Port Talbot	165
Port Talbot	Port Talbot	Neath Port Talbot	165
Aberavon	Sandfields East	Neath Port Talbot	165
Aberavon	Aberavon	Neath Port Talbot	165
Sandfields	Sandfields East	Neath Port Talbot	165
Baglan	Baglan	Neath Port Talbot	165
Briton Ferry	Briton Ferry	Neath Port Talbot	165
Jersey Marine	Coedffranc	Neath Port Talbot	165
Port Tennant	St Thomas	Swansea	165
Dan-y-graig	St Thomas	Swansea	165
St Thomas	St Thomas	Swansea	165
Swansea	Swansea	Swansea	165
Uplands	Uplands	Swansea	164/165
Sketty	Sketty	Swansea	164/165
Lower Sketty	Sketty	Swansea	164/165
West Cross	Mumbles	Swansea	164/165
Oystermouth	Mumbles	Swansea	164/165
The Mumbles	Mumbles	Swansea	164/165
Thistleboon	Mumbles	Swansea	164/165
Langland	Mumbles	Swansea	164/165
Caswell	Bishopston	Swansea	164/165
Bishopston	Bishopston	Swansea	164
Southgate	Pennard	Swansea	164
Parkmill	Ilston	Swansea	164
Penmaen	Ilston	Swansea	164
Nicholaston	Ilston	Swansea	164
Penrice	Penrice	Swansea	164
Oxwich	Penrice	Swansea	164
Horton	Penrice	Swansea	164
Port Eynon	Port Eynon	Swansea	164
Overton	Port Eynon	Swansea	164
Pitton	Rhossili	Swansea	164
Middleton	Rhossili	Swansea	164
Rhossili	Rhossili	Swansea	164
Llangennith	Llangennith, Llanmadoc and Cheriton	Swansea	164
Llanmadoc	Llangennith, Llanmadoc and Cheriton	Swansea	164
Cheriton	Llangennith, Llanmadoc and Cheriton	Swansea	164
Landimore	Llangennith, Llanmadoc and Cheriton	Swansea	164
Leason	Llanrhidian Lower	Swansea	164
Oldwalls	Llanrhidian Lower	Swansea	164
Llanrhidian	Llanrhidian Lower	Swansea	164
Wernffrwd	Llanrhidian Higher	Swansea	164
Llanmorlais	Llanrhidian Higher	Swansea	164
Crofty	Llanrhidian Higher	Swansea	164
Pen-clawdd	Llanrhidian Higher	Swansea	164
Gowerton	Gowerton	Swansea	164
Loughor	Loughor	Swansea	164/178

== Carmarthenshire Coast section ==
From the Loughor estuary west around Carmarthen Bay to the Pembrokeshire border near Amroth.

Town or village	Community	Unitary authority	OS Explorer map	OS Grid ref.
Bynea	Llanelli Rural	Carmarthenshire	164/178
Morfa	Llanelli	Carmarthenshire	164/178
Llanelli	Llanelli	Carmarthenshire	164/178
Seaside	Llanelli	Carmarthenshire	164/178
Sandy	Llanelli Rural	Carmarthenshire	164/178
Pwll	Llanelli Rural	Carmarthenshire	164/178
Burry Port	Burry Port	Carmarthenshire	164/178
Pembrey	Cefn Sidan	Carmarthenshire	164/178
Kidwelly	Kidwelly	Carmarthenshire	177/178
Llansaint	St Ishmael	Carmarthenshire	177
St Ishmael	St Ishmael	Carmarthenshire	177
Ferryside	St Ishmael	Carmarthenshire	177/178
Croesyceiliog	Llandyfaelog	Carmarthenshire	177/178
Pen-sarn	Llangunnor	Carmarthenshire	177
Carmarthen	Carmarthen	Carmarthenshire	177
Johnstown	Carmarthen	Carmarthenshire	177
Llangain	Llangain	Carmarthenshire	177/178
Morfa Bach	Llanstephan	Carmarthenshire	177
Llansteffan	Llanstephan	Carmarthenshire	177
St Clears	St Clears	Carmarthenshire	177
Cross Inn	Laugharne Township	Carmarthenshire	177
Laugharne	Laugharne Township	Carmarthenshire	177
Plashett	Laugharne Township	Carmarthenshire	177
Brook	Llandowror	Carmarthenshire	177
Llanmiloe	Llandowror	Carmarthenshire	177
Pendine	Pendine	Carmarthenshire	177
Marros	Eglwyscummin	Carmarthenshire	177

== Pembrokeshire Coast Path section ==
From Amroth around the entire length of the national park to Cardigan. The inner estuary of the Cleddau is not included.

Town or village	Community	Unitary authority	OS Explorer map	OS Grid ref.
Amroth	Amroth	Pembrokeshire	177/OL36
Saundersfoot	Saundersfoot	Pembrokeshire	OL36
New Hedges	St Mary Out Liberty	Pembrokeshire	OL36
Tenby	Tenby	Pembrokeshire	OL36
Penally	Penally	Pembrokeshire	OL36
Lydstep	Manorbier	Pembrokeshire	OL36
Manorbier	Manorbier	Pembrokeshire	OL36
Jameston	Manorbier	Pembrokeshire	OL36
Freshwater East	Lamphey	Pembrokeshire	OL36
East Trewent	Stackpole	Pembrokeshire	OL36
Stackpole Elidor (or Cheriton)	Stackpole	Pembrokeshire	OL36
Stackpole	Stackpole	Pembrokeshire	OL36
Bosherston	Stackpole	Pembrokeshire	OL36
Merrion	Castlemartin	Pembrokeshire	OL36
Warren	Castlemartin	Pembrokeshire	OL36
Castlemartin	Castlemartin	Pembrokeshire	OL36
Angle	Angle	Pembrokeshire	OL36
Rhoscrowther	Hundleton	Pembrokeshire	OL36
Hundleton	Hundleton	Pembrokeshire	OL36
Monkton	Pembroke	Pembrokeshire	OL36
Pembroke	Pembroke	Pembrokeshire	OL36
Pembroke Dock	Pembroke Dock	Pembrokeshire	OL36
Pembroke Ferry	Pembroke Dock	Pembrokeshire	OL36
Burton Ferry	Burton	Pembrokeshire	OL36
Neyland	Neyland	Pembrokeshire	OL36
Llanstadwell	Llanstadwell	Pembrokeshire	OL36
Hazelbeach	Llanstadwell	Pembrokeshire	OL36
Waterston	Llanstadwell	Pembrokeshire	OL36
Milford Haven	Milford Haven	Pembrokeshire	OL36
Hubberston	Milford Haven	Pembrokeshire	OL36
Hakin	Milford Haven	Pembrokeshire	OL36
Herbrandston	Herbrandston	Pembrokeshire	OL36
St Ishmael's	St Ishmael's	Pembrokeshire	OL36
Dale	Dale	Pembrokeshire	OL36
Marloes	Marloes and St Brides	Pembrokeshire	OL36
Little Haven	The Havens	Pembrokeshire	OL36
Broad Haven	The Havens	Pembrokeshire	OL36
Druidston	Nolton and Roch	Pembrokeshire	OL36
Nolton	Nolton and Roch	Pembrokeshire	OL36
Nolton Haven	Nolton and Roch	Pembrokeshire	OL36
Newgale	Brawdy	Pembrokeshire	OL35/OL36
Penycwm	Brawdy	Pembrokeshire	OL35/OL36
Solva	Solva	Pembrokeshire	OL35
Llandruidion	St Davids and the Cathedral Close	Pembrokeshire	OL35
Trelerw	St Davids and the Cathedral Close	Pembrokeshire	OL35
St David's	St Davids and the Cathedral Close	Pembrokeshire	OL35
Cyffredin	Llanrhian	Pembrokeshire	OL35
Abereiddy	Llanrhian	Pembrokeshire	OL35
Porthgain	Llanrhian	Pembrokeshire	OL35
Llanrhian	Llanrhian	Pembrokeshire	OL35
Trefin	Llanrhian	Pembrokeshire	OL35
Abercastle	Mathry	Pembrokeshire	OL35
Mathry	Mathry	Pembrokeshire	OL35
Granston Treopert	Pencaer	Pembrokeshire	OL35
St Nicholas	Pencaer	Pembrokeshire	OL35
Trefasser	Pencaer	Pembrokeshire	OL35
Llanwnda	Pencaer	Pembrokeshire	OL35
Goodwick	Fishguard and Goodwick	Pembrokeshire	OL35
Fishguard	Fishguard and Goodwick	Pembrokeshire	OL35
Dinas Cross	Dinas Cross	Pembrokeshire	OL35
Bryn-henllan	Dinas Cross	Pembrokeshire	OL35
Cwm-yr-Eglwys	Dinas Cross	Pembrokeshire	OL35
Newport	Newport	Pembrokeshire	OL35
Nevern	Nevern	Pembrokeshire	OL35
Moylgrove	Nevern	Pembrokeshire	OL35
Cippyn	St Dogmaels	Pembrokeshire	OL35
St Dogmaels	St Dogmaels	Pembrokeshire	OL35

== Ceredigion Coast Path section ==
From Cardigan north along the Cardigan Bay coast to the Dyfi Estuary but including a further short section in Powys to Machynlleth.

Town or village	Community	Unitary authority	OS Explorer map	OS Grid ref.
Cardigan	Cardigan	Ceredigion	OL35/198
Gwbert	Y Ferwig	Ceredigion	OL35/198
Y Ferwig	Y Ferwig	Ceredigion	OL35/198
Parcllyn	Aberporth	Ceredigion	198
Aberporth	Aberporth	Ceredigion	198
Tresaith	Penbryn	Ceredigion	198
Penbryn	Penbryn	Ceredigion	198
Llangranog	Llangrannog	Ceredigion	198
Cwmtydu	Llandysiliogogo	Ceredigion	198
Cross Inn	Llanllwchaiarn	Ceredigion	198
New Quay	New Quay	Ceredigion	198
Gilfachreda	Llanarth	Ceredigion	198
Henfynyw	Henfynyw	Ceredigion	198
Aberaeron	Aberaeron	Ceredigion	198
Aberarth	Dyffryn Arth	Ceredigion	198/199
Llansantffraed	Llansantffraed	Ceredigion	198/199
Llanrhystud	Llanrhystyd	Ceredigion	199/213
Llanddeiniol	Llanrhystud	Ceredigion	213
Blaenplwyf (or Pont Lanio)	Llanfarian	Ceredigion	213
Penparcau	Aberystwyth	Ceredigion	213
Trefechan	Aberystwyth	Ceredigion	213
Aberystwyth	Aberystwyth	Ceredigion	213
Llangorwen (Cladach Bay)	Tirymynydd	Ceredigion	198
Borth	Borth	Ceredigion	213/OL23
Ynyslas	Borth	Ceredigion	OL23
Tre Taliesin	Llangynfelyn	Ceredigion	OL23
Tre'r-ddol	Llangynfelyn	Ceredigion	OL23
Furnace	Ysgubor-y-Coed	Ceredigion	OL23
Eglwys Fach	Ysgubor-y-Coed	Ceredigion	OL23
Glandyfi	Ysgubor-y-Coed	Ceredigion	OL23
Derwenlas	Cadfarch	Ceredigion	OL23
Machynlleth	Machynlleth	Ceredigion	OL23

== Llŷn Coast Path section ==
Llŷn Coastal Path along the Gwynedd coast of Cardigan Bay, the Llŷn Peninsula, Caernarfon Bay and the Menai Strait from Machynlleth to Bangor.

Town or village	Community	Unitary authority	OS Explorer map	OS Grid ref.
Llugwy	Pennal	Gwynedd	OL23
Pennal	Pennal	Gwynedd	OL23
Cwrt	Pennal	Gwynedd	OL23
Aber-Tafol	Aberdyfi	Gwynedd	OL23
Aberdyfi	Aberdyfi	Gwynedd	OL23
Tywyn	Tywyn	Gwynedd	OL23
Rhoslefain	Llangelynnin	Gwynedd	OL23
Llangelynin	Llangelynin	Gwynedd	OL23
Llwyngwril	Llangelynnin	Gwynedd	OL23
Friog	Arthog	Gwynedd	OL23
Fairbourne	Arthog	Gwynedd	OL23
Arthog	Arthog	Gwynedd	OL23
Barmouth	Barmouth	Gwynedd	OL18/OL23
Llanaber	Barmouth	Gwynedd	OL18/OL23
Tal-y-bont	Dyffryn Ardudwy	Gwynedd	OL18
Dyffryn Ardudwy	Dyffryn Ardudwy	Gwynedd	OL18
Llanenddwyn	Dyffryn Ardudwy	Gwynedd	OL18
Llanbedr	Llanbedr	Gwynedd	OL18
Llandanwg	Llanbedr	Gwynedd	OL18
Llanfair	Llanbedr	Gwynedd	OL18
Harlech	Harlech	Gwynedd	OL18
Ynys	Talsarnau	Gwynedd	OL18
Glan-y-wern	Talsarnau	Gwynedd	OL18
Talsarnau	Talsarnau	Gwynedd	OL18
Bryn Bwbach	Talsarnau	Gwynedd	OL18
Maentwrog	Maentwrog	Gwynedd	OL18
Penrhyndeudraeth	Penrhyndeudraeth	Gwynedd	OL18
Minffordd	Penrhyndeudraeth	Gwynedd	OL18
Portmeirion	Penrhyndeudraeth	Gwynedd	OL18
Porthmadog	Porthmadog	Gwynedd	OL18/254
Borth-y-Gest	Porthmadog	Gwynedd	OL18/254
Morfa Bychan	Porthmadog	Gwynedd	OL18/254
Criccieth	Criccieth	Gwynedd	254
Llanystumdwy	Llanystumdwy	Gwynedd	254
Afon Wen	Llanystumdwy	Gwynedd	254
Abererch	Pwllheli	Gwynedd	253/254
Pwllheli	Pwllheli	Gwynedd	253/254
Llanbedrog	Llanbedrog	Gwynedd	253
Abersoch	Llanengan	Gwynedd	253
Machroes	Llanengan	Gwynedd	253
Llanengan	Llanengan	Gwynedd	253
Llandegwning	Botwnnog	Gwynedd	253
Y Rhiw	Aberdaron	Gwynedd	253
Llanfaelrhys	Aberdaron	Gwynedd	253
Aberdaron	Aberdaron	Gwynedd	253
Llangwnnadl	Tudweiliog	Gwynedd	253
Tudweiliog	Tudweiliog	Gwynedd	253
Rhos-y-llan	Tudweiliog	Gwynedd	253
Groesffordd	Nefyn	Gwynedd	253
Edern	Nefyn	Gwynedd	253
Porthdinllaen	Nefyn	Gwynedd	253
Morfa Nefyn	Nefyn	Gwynedd	253
Nefyn	Nefyn	Gwynedd	253
Pistyll	Pistyll	Gwynedd	253
Nant Gwrtheyrn	Pistyll	Gwynedd	253/254
Llithfaen	Pistyll	Gwynedd	253/254
Trefor	Llanaelhaearn	Gwynedd	253
Gyrn Goch	Clynnog	Gwynedd	253
Clynnog-fawr	Clynnog	Gwynedd	253
Aberdesach	Clynnog	Gwynedd	253
Pontllyfni	Clynnog	Gwynedd	253
Llandwrog	Llandwrog	Gwynedd	253
Saron	Llanwnda	Gwynedd	253
Caernarfon	Caernarfon	Gwynedd	263/OL17
Y Felinheli	Y Felinheli	Gwynedd	OL17
Bangor	Bangor	Gwynedd	OL17

== Anglesey Coast Path section ==
Anglesey Coastal Path clockwise around the coast of Anglesey from Menai Bridge.

Town or village	Community	Unitary authority	OS Explorer map	OS Grid ref.
Menai Bridge	Menai Bridge	Isle of Anglesey	263
Llanfairpwllgwyngyll	Llanfairpwllgwyngyll	Isle of Anglesey	263
Llanidan	Llanidan	Isle of Anglesey	263
Brynsiencyn	Llanidan	Isle of Anglesey	263
Dwyran	Rhosyr	Isle of Anglesey	263
Pen-Lôn	Rhosyr	Isle of Anglesey	263
Newborough	Rhosyr	Isle of Anglesey	263
Malltraeth	Bodorgan	Isle of Anglesey	262/263
Hermon	Bodorgan	Isle of Anglesey	262/263
Llangadwaladr	Bodorgan	Isle of Anglesey	262/263
Aberffraw	Aberffraw	Isle of Anglesey	262
Llanfaelog	Llanfaelog	Isle of Anglesey	262
Rhosneigr	Llanfaelog	Isle of Anglesey	262
Llanfairyneubwll	Llanfair-yn-Neubwll	Isle of Anglesey	262
Four Mile Bridge	Valley	Isle of Anglesey	262
Rhoscolyn	Rhoscolyn	Isle of Anglesey	262
Trearddur	Trearddur	Isle of Anglesey	262
Holyhead	Holyhead	Isle of Anglesey	262
Môrawelon	Holyhead	Isle of Anglesey	262
Valley	Valley	Isle of Anglesey	262
Llanfachraeth	Llanfachraeth	Isle of Anglesey	262
Llanfaethlu	Llanfaethlu	Isle of Anglesey	262
Rhydwyn	Cylch-y-garn	Isle of Anglesey	262
Tregele	Llanbadrig	Isle of Anglesey	262
Cemaes	Llanbadrig	Isle of Anglesey	262
Bull Bay (Porthllechog)	Amlwch	Isle of Anglesey	263
Amlwch	Amlwch	Isle of Anglesey	263
Amlwch Port	Amlwch	Isle of Anglesey	263
Llaneilian	Llaneilian	Isle of Anglesey	263
Penysarn	Llaneilian	Isle of Anglesey	263
City Dulas	Moelfre	Isle of Anglesey	263
Brynrefail	Moelfre	Isle of Anglesey	263
Moelfre	Moelfre	Isle of Anglesey	263
Benllech	Llanfair-Mathafarn-Eithaf	Isle of Anglesey	263
Pentraeth	Llanfair-Mathafarn-Eithaf	Isle of Anglesey	263
Llanddona	Llanddona	Isle of Anglesey	263
Glan-yr-afon	Llangoed	Isle of Anglesey	263
Penmon	Llangoed	Isle of Anglesey	263
Llangoed	Llangoed	Isle of Anglesey	263
Llanfaes	Beaumaris	Isle of Anglesey	263
Beaumaris	Beaumaris	Isle of Anglesey	263
Hen Bentref Llandegfan	Llandegfan	Isle of Anglesey	263
Llandegfan	Llandegfan	Isle of Anglesey	263

== North Wales Path section ==
North Wales Path along the Liverpool Bay coast and Dee Estuary from Bangor to Chester.

Town or village	Community	Unitary authority	OS Explorer map	OS Grid ref.
Maesgeirchen	Bangor	Gwynedd	OL17
Llandygai	Llandygai	Gwynedd	OL17
Bryn	Llandygai	Gwynedd	OL17
Tal-y-bont	Llandygai	Gwynedd	OL17
Aber	Aber	Gwynedd	OL17
Llanfairfechan	Llanfairfechan	Conwy	OL17
Pemmaenan	Penmaenmawr	Conwy	OL17
Penmaenmawr	Penmaenmawr	Conwy	OL17
Dwygyfylchi	Penmaenmawr	Conwy	OL17
Conwy	Conwy	Conwy	OL17
Llandudno Junction	Conwy	Conwy	OL17
Deganwy	Conwy	Conwy	OL17
Llandudno	Llandudno	Conwy	OL17
Penrhyn Bay	Llandudno	Conwy	OL17
Rhos-on-Sea	Rhos-on-Sea	Conwy	OL17
Llandrillo-yn-Rhos	Rhos-on-Sea	Conwy	OL17
Colwyn Bay	Colwyn Bay	Conwy	OL17
Old Colwyn	Old Colwyn	Conwy	OL17
Llysfaen	Llysfaen	Conwy	OL17
Llanddulas	Llanddulas and Rhyd-y-Foel	Conwy	264
Abergele	Abergele	Conwy	264
Pensarn	Abergele	Conwy	264
Belgrano	Abergele	Conwy	264
Towyn	Kinmel Bay and Towyn	Denbighshire	264
Kinmel Bay	Kinmel Bay and Towyn	Denbighshire	264
Foryd	Kinmel Bay and Towyn	Denbighshire	264
Rhyl	Rhyl	Denbighshire	264
Prestatyn	Prestatyn	Denbighshire	264/265
Gronant	Llanasa	Flintshire	264/265
Talacre	Llanasa	Flintshire	265
Ffynnongroyw	Llanasa	Flintshire	265
Mostyn	Mostyn	Flintshire	265
Greenfield, Flintshire	Holywell	Flintshire	265
Whelston	Bagillt	Flintshire	265
Bagillt	Bagillt	Flintshire	265
Flint	Flint	Flintshire	265/266
Oakenholt	Flint	Flintshire	265
Rockcliffe	Flint	Flintshire	266
Kelsterton	Connah's Quay	Flintshire	266
Connah's Quay	Connah's Quay	Flintshire	266
Shotton	Shotton	Flintshire	266
Queensferry	Queensferry	Flintshire	266
Garden City	Sealand	Flintshire	266
Chester	Chester	Cheshire West and Chester	266
