= List of scheduled monuments in Swansea =

Scheduled Monuments in Swansea, Wales.
=Prehistoric =Roman =Early Medieval
=Medieval =Post-Medieval/Modern

The city and county of Swansea covers, in addition to the port city of Swansea, areas of upland to the north, and the Gower peninsula to the west. It is on Gower that the earliest scheduled monuments are found. Three sites have evidence of habitation from the Paleolithic, a time before the last ice age. These include the oldest rock painting in Britain and the earliest known burial in Western Europe. There are in total 124 scheduled sites. Prehistoric sites of many sorts are found, particularly on Gower. 64 pre-historic sites are from Paleolithic to Iron Age dates, and include caves, burial mounds and tombs, cairns, defensive enclosures, hillforts and promentary forts. Roman and early medieval sites, by contrast are scarce. The post-Norman Medieval period, by contrast, has 26 sites, 17 of them castles or other defensive monuments. The other nine are all ecclesiastical monuments. The 26 post-medieval monuments are more diverse, including industrial and maritime sites, but also leats, quarries, a mill and even an observatory and an orchid house. All of the Swansea administrative area lies within the historic county of Glamorgan.

Scheduled monuments have statutory protection. It is illegal to disturb the ground surface or any standing remains. The compilation of the list is undertaken by Cadw Welsh Historic Monuments, which is an executive agency of the National Assembly of Wales. The list of scheduled monuments below is supplied by Cadw with additional material from RCAHMW and Glamorgan-Gwent Archaeological Trust.

== Scheduled monuments in Swansea ==
Image	Name	Site type	Community	Location	Details	Period	SAM No & Refs
	Longhole Cave	Cave	Port Eynon	51.5431°N 4.2348°W, SS451850	Cave with Paleolithic flint tools	Prehistoric (Paleolithic)	GM391
1823 drawing of the excavations in Goat's Hole, Paviland, Gower	Paviland Cave	Cave	Rhossili	51.5502°N 4.2552°W, SS437859	Paleolithic burial cave known as 'Goat's Cave'. Buried 33,000 years ago, the remains found in 1823 are the oldest known ceremonial burial in Western Europe.	Prehistoric (Upper Paleolithic)	GM504
	Cathole Cave	Cave	Ilston	51.5899°N 4.1124°W, SS537900	Cave on Gower, occupied over 30,000 years from Palaeolithic to Medieval times. In 2010 engraved rock art was found of a reindeer, dated to upwards of 12,000 BC, making it the oldest rock art in the British Isles.	Prehistoric (Upper Palaeolithic)	GM349
	Cefn Bryn Burial Chamber	Chambered long cairn	Ilston	51.5781°N 4.1551°W, SS507887	A Chambered long cairn towards the base of the Cefn Bryn ridge	Prehistoric (Neolithic)	GM167
Entrance to the burial chamber	Parc Cwm long cairn (Parc le Breos)	Chambered long cairn	Ilston	51.5883°N 4.1128°W, SS537898	Chambered tomb in which human remains were interred over a 300 to 800-year period in the Neolithic. Discovered in 1869, and brought into public ownership and partly reconstructed in 1961, it had a detailed excavation in 1998.	Prehistoric (Neolithic)	GM122
Penmaen Burial Chamber	Penmaen Burrows Burial Chamber	Chambered tomb	Ilston	51.5728°N 4.1203°W, SS531881	Megalithic burial chamber first excavated in 1860. Now being inundated by sand dunes.	Prehistoric (Neolithic)	GM123
Sweyne's Howe burial chamber - South	Sweyne's Howe Chambered Cairns	Chambered tomb	Llangennith, Llanmadoc and Cheriton	51.585°N 4.2805°W, SS421898	Three Neolithic and later chambered tombs in varying states of collapse, on the upper eastern slopes of Rhossili Down.	Prehistoric (Neolithic)	GM027
	Two Burial Chambers on Graig Fawr	Chambered tomb	Pontardulais	51.7373°N 4.0164°W, SN608062		Prehistoric (Neolithic)	GM513
Standing Stone in Bonymaen	Bon y Maen Standing Stone	Standing stone	Bonymaen	51.6404°N 3.9112°W, SS678952	A sandstone monolith on the eastern edge of Swansea, on a ridge between the Tawe valley and Crymlyn Bog.	Prehistoric (Bronze Age)	GM177
	Cockett standing stone	Standing stone	Cockett	51.6351°N 3.9877°W, SS625947		Prehistoric	GM582
	Llethrid Tooth Cave	Cave	Ilston	51.5979°N 4.1213°W, SS531909	Early Bronze Age ossuary in a cave 1.4 km from Parc Cwm long cairn, and may be contemporary with later burials there.	Prehistoric (Bronze Age)	GM284
Cliff entrance to Culver Hole	Culver Hole	Cave	Llangennith, Llanmadoc and Cheriton	51.6127°N 4.3038°W, SS405929	Coastal cave near Burry Holms and Three Chimneys, in which were found human remains and artefacts from all periods from Bronze Age through to the 9th century AD.	Prehistoric (Bronze Age onwards)	GM087
Arthur's Stone – a capstone over a Neolithic c hamberedt Tomb	Arthur's Stone, Cefn Bryn	Chambered tomb	Llanrhidian Lower	51.5936°N 4.1794°W, SS491905	Double stone chambered tomb, capped by a huge capstone, which probably always was exposed above the mound. Also called Maen Ceti, it may have been in situ before the tomb was excavated under it.	Prehistoric (Bronze Age)	GM003
	Lower Greyhound Inn Standing Stones	Standing stone	Llanrhidian Lower	51.6065°N 4.1865°W, SS486920		Prehistoric	GM152
Samson's Jack standing stone	Samson's Jack	Standing stone	Llanrhidian Lower	51.6075°N 4.2013°W, SS476921	Standing stone, 3.2m high, embedded in a field boundary bank. It is also known as Mansel Jank	Prehistoric (Bronze Age)	GM133
	Ty'r Coed standing stone	Standing stone	Llanrhidian Lower	51.6033°N 4.2025°W, SS475916	Standing stone, 2.5m high, embedded in a field boundary bank.	Prehistoric (Bronze Age)	GM151
	Mynydd Pysgodlyn Round Barrow	Round barrow	Mawr	51.7254°N 3.9775°W, SN635048		Prehistoric	GM202
	Berry Ringwork	Ringwork	Port Eynon	51.5742°N 4.2058°W, SS472884		Prehistoric	GM178
	Burry Lesser Standing Stone	Standing stone	Port Eynon	51.5885°N 4.2213°W, SS462900		Prehistoric	GM150
	Burry Menhir	Standing stone	Port Eynon	51.5885°N 4.2186°W, SS464900		Prehistoric	GM134
	Burry Standing Stone	Standing stone	Port Eynon	51.5806°N 4.2112°W, SS468891		Prehistoric	GM191
	Newton henge, cropmark	Henge	Port Eynon	51.5711°N 4.2437°W, SS446881		Prehistoric	GM580
	Cave 40m SE of Deborah's Hole	Cave site	Rhossili	51.5537°N 4.26°W, SS434862	Natural cave overlooking the seas, with a Bronze Age mound at the entrance	Prehistoric (Bronze Age)	GM622
	Round Cairn with Cist on Mynydd Drumau	Round cairn	Clydach, (also Dyffryn Clydach), (see also Neath Port Talbot)	51.6876°N 3.8465°W, SN724003		Prehistoric	GM387
	Cairns on Cefn Bryn	Round cairn	Ilston	51.5795°N 4.1365°W, SS520889		Prehistoric	GM038
	Cefn Bryn Burnt Mound	Burnt mound	Ilston	51.5823°N 4.1389°W, SS519892		Prehistoric	GM543
	Burnt Mound on Rhossili Down	Burnt mound	Llangennith, Llanmadoc and Cheriton	51.5915°N 4.2836°W, SS419905		Prehistoric	GM476
Cairn XII on Llanmadoc Hill	Llanmadoc Hill, cairn on E end of	Round cairn	Llangennith, Llanmadoc and Cheriton	51.6115°N 4.2544°W, SS439927	A large round cairn, 21metres across, offset within an earlier ring-cairn measuring some 30metres in diameter.	Prehistoric	GM579
Cairn on the western end of Llanmadoc Hill	Llanmadoc Hill, cairn on W end of	Round cairn	Llangennith, Llanmadoc and Cheriton	51.6087°N 4.269°W, SS429924	Round cairn some 17 metres (55ft) in diameter, covered in vegetation, near the trig point. The pile of stones in its centre is presumed to be a recent addition by walkers.	Prehistoric	GM578
Top of Rhossili Down	Round Cairn on Bessie's Meadow	Round cairn	Llangennith, Llanmadoc and Cheriton	51.5874°N 4.2838°W, SS418900	A good example of an upland cairn, having both kerb and cist still intact. Part of a wider group of burial cairns, it is just below the northern summit of Rhossili Down.	Prehistoric	GM498
	Burnt Mound 300m SW of Arthur's Stone	Burnt mound	Llanrhidian Lower	51.5922°N 4.1829°W, SS488904		Prehistoric	GM436
	Burnt Mound North of Arthur's Stone	Burnt mound	Llanrhidian Lower	51.5964°N 4.1817°W, SS489908		Prehistoric	GM544
	Pen-y-Crug Round Barrow	Round barrow	Llanrhidian Lower	51.6014°N 4.1514°W, SS510913		Prehistoric	GM153
	Round Cairn W of Arthur's Stone	Round cairn	Llanrhidian Lower	51.5936°N 4.1809°W, SS490905		Prehistoric	GM196
	Cairn 250m SW of Banc Llyn-Mawr	Round cairn	Mawr	51.7451°N 3.9914°W, SN626070		Prehistoric	GM384
	Pant-y-Ffa Round Cairn	Round cairn	Mawr	51.706°N 4.0009°W, SN618027		Prehistoric	GM201
	Ring Cairn on Tor Clawdd	Ring cairn	Mawr	51.7396°N 3.9271°W, SN670062		Prehistoric	GM353
	Garn Goch Round Barrow	Round barrow	Penllergaer	51.6641°N 4.0176°W, SS605980		Prehistoric	GM199
	Rhossili Down Round Cairns	Round cairn	Rhossili	51.578°N 4.2807°W, SS420890		Prehistoric	GM194
	Bishopston Valley Camp	Promontory Fort - inland	Bishopston	51.5709°N 4.0659°W, SS569878		Prehistoric	GM126
	Caswell Cliff Fort	Promontory Fort - coastal	Bishopston	51.5693°N 4.0387°W, SS588875		Prehistoric	GM132
	Burry Holms Camp	Promontory Fort - coastal	Llangennith, Llanmadoc and Cheriton	51.6094°N 4.3135°W, SS398925		Prehistoric	GM088
	Enclosure on Rhossili Down	Enclosure	Llangennith, Llanmadoc and Cheriton	51.585°N 4.2773°W, SS423898		Prehistoric	GM487
	The Bulwark, Llanmadoc Hill	Hillfort	Llangennith, Llanmadoc and Cheriton	51.612°N 4.2499°W, SS443927		Prehistoric	GM061
	Three Camps on Harding's Down	Hillfort	Llangennith, Llanmadoc and Cheriton	51.5929°N 4.2577°W, SS437906		Prehistoric	GM060
	Earthwork 108m NNW of Fforest Newydd	Enclosure	Llangyfelach	51.6962°N 3.9745°W, SS636015		Prehistoric	GM308
	Dan-y-Lan Camp	Enclosure	Llanrhidian Higher	51.6422°N 4.0906°W, SS554957		Prehistoric	GM268
	Gron-Gaer	Enclosure	Llanrhidian Higher	51.6329°N 4.096°W, SS550947		Prehistoric	GM197
	Pen-y-Gaer	Hillfort	Llanrhidian Higher	51.6394°N 4.1163°W, SS536955		Prehistoric	GM198
	Cil Ifor Promontory Fort	Promontory Fort - inland	Llanrhidian Lower	51.6098°N 4.1594°W, SS505923		Prehistoric	GM124
	Stembridge Camp	Hillfort	Llanrhidian Lower	51.6011°N 4.2108°W, SS469914		Prehistoric	GM125
	Ring Cairn on Craig Fawr	Earthwork (unclassified)	Mawr	51.7416°N 3.9876°W, SN628066		Prehistoric	GM380
	High Pennard	Earthwork (unclassified)	Pennard	51.5603°N 4.0674°W, SS567866		Prehistoric	GM045
	Earthwork on Graig Fawr	Hillfort	Pontardulais	51.7433°N 4.0027°W, SN618068		Prehistoric	GM386
	Earthwork 450m SW of Llanddewi Church	Enclosure	Port Eynon	51.5767°N 4.2298°W, SS455783		Prehistoric	GM334
	Reynoldston Camp	Enclosure	Reynoldston	51.5876°N 4.1905°W, SS483899		Prehistoric	GM195
Promontory fort near "the Knave"	Deborah's Hole Camp	Promontory Fort - coastal	Rhossili	51.5545°N 4.2633°W, SS431863	Also known as 'The Knave Promontory fort', this double embankment encloses an area 52m x 44m, perched against 60m high sea cliffs. Excavated in 1938. Occupation pottery was dated c50 BC to 50 AD	Prehistoric	GM128
	Horse Cliff Camp	Promontory Fort - coastal	Rhossili	51.5515°N 4.2586°W, SS435860		Prehistoric	GM192
	Lewes Castle Promontory Fort	Promontory Fort - coastal	Rhossili	51.5625°N 4.2888°W, SS414873		Prehistoric	GM470
	Old Castle Camp	Promontory Fort - coastal	Rhossili	51.5684°N 4.2966°W, SS409880		Prehistoric	GM193
	Paviland Camp	Promontory Fort - coastal	Rhossili	51.5509°N 4.2555°W, SS437859		Prehistoric	GM131
Promentary fort on the Inner Head of Worms Head	Promontory Fort on Worms Head	Promontory Fort - coastal	Rhossili	51.564°N 4.3193°W, SS393875		Prehistoric	GM492
	Thurba Camp	Promontory Fort - coastal	Rhossili	51.5603°N 4.2783°W, SS421870		Prehistoric	GM127
	Earthwork on Kilvey Hill	Enclosure	St Thomas	51.6356°N 3.9176°W, SS673947		Prehistoric	GM315
	Church Hill Romano-British Enclosure	Enclosure	Ilston	51.5883°N 4.1145°W, SS536898		Roman	GM603
	Mynydd Carn-Goch Roman Earthworks	Practice camp	Llwchwr	51.6562°N 4.0134°W, SS608971		Roman	GM269
	Roman Practice Camp on Stafford Common	Practice camp	Llwchwr	51.6568°N 4.0376°W, SS591973		Roman	GM502
Hermitage ruins on Burry Holms, Gower	Medieval Hermitage Site on Burry Holms	Hermitage	Llangennith, Llanmadoc and Cheriton	51.6093°N 4.3105°W, SS401925		Early Medieval	GM473
	St Cennydd's Church Cross-shaft	Cross shaft	Llangennith, Llanmadoc and Cheriton	51.5996°N 4.27°W, SS428914		Early Medieval	GM621
	St Madoc's Church Cross-incised Stones	Cross	Llangennith, Llanmadoc and Cheriton	51.618°N 4.2564°W, SS438934		Early Medieval	GM223
	Llangyfelach Cross-Base	Cross	Llangyfelach	51.6728°N 3.959°W, SS646989		Early Medieval	GM299
	Cross-Slab from Woodlands, Stout Hall (now in St George's Church, Reynoldston)	Cross-marked stone	Reynoldston	51.5885°N 4.1961°W, SS479900		Early Medieval	GM089
	Chantry Acre medieval chapel	Chapel	Bishopston	51.5741°N 4.0553°W, SS576881		Medieval	GM548
	Old Castle Camp	Ringwork	Bishopston	51.591°N 4.0484°W, SS582900		Medieval	GM154
	Original Swansea Castle	Castle	Castle	51.6211°N 3.9414°W, SS657931		Medieval	GM441
Swansea Castle	Swansea Castle	Castle	Castle	51.6205°N 3.9411°W, SS657930		Medieval	GM012
	St Michael's Chapel, Cwrt-y-Carne	Chapel	Gorseinon	51.6844°N 4.0672°W, SN571004		Medieval	GM363
	Llandeilo Castle Mound	Motte	Grovesend	51.7049°N 4.0465°W, SN586026		Medieval	GM200
	Penmaen Burrows Church	Church	Ilston	51.5731°N 4.1206°W, SS531881	Headland inundated by sand by the 14th century, burying the now-ruined stone church. Excavated, 1861 and remains sunk into sand and overgrowth.	Medieval	GM130
	Penmaen Burrows Ringwork	Ringwork	Ilston	51.572°N 4.1166°W, SS534880		Medieval	GM129
	Trinity Well and Remains of Chapel	Chapel	Ilston	51.5853°N 4.09°W, SS552894		Medieval	GM158
	Bovehill Castle	Manor	Llangennith, Llanmadoc and Cheriton	51.6169°N 4.2196°W, SS464932		Medieval	GM149
	North Hill Tor Camp	Enclosure	Llangennith, Llanmadoc and Cheriton	51.6217°N 4.2363°W, SS452937		Medieval	GM062
	Llanelen Chapel Site	Chapel	Llanrhidian Lower	51.6193°N 4.1517°W, SS511933		Medieval	GM376
West entrance to Weobley Castle	Weobley Castle	Castle	Llanrhidian Lower	51.6128°N 4.1993°W, SS478927		Medieval	GM010
Loughor Castle	Loughor Castle	Castle	Llwchwr	51.6622°N 4.0771°W, SS564979	Founded by Henry de Beaumont, 1st Earl of Warwick from 1106, it is built into the corner of the Roman fort of Leucarum. Over 250 turbulent years it was progressively rebuilt in stone. Only one substantial tower now remains, overlooking the estuary in a park in lower Loughor.	Medieval	GM046
	Cae Castell (Rhyndwyclydach Medieval Earthwork)	Earthwork (unclassified)	Mawr	51.7261°N 3.8921°W, SN694047		Medieval	GM439
	Penlle'r Castell	Castle	Mawr	51.7691°N 3.9356°W, SN665096		Medieval	GM255
Oystermouth Castle	Oystermouth Castle	Castle	Mumbles	51.5771°N 4.0027°W, SS613883		Medieval	GM007
Ruins of Pennard Castle	Pennard Castle & Church	Castle	Pennard	51.5765°N 4.1026°W, SS544885		Medieval	GM044
	Norton Camp	Ringwork	Penrice	51.5595°N 4.1775°W, SS491867		Medieval	GM157
Oxwich Castle	Oxwich Castle	Castle	Penrice	51.5555°N 4.1683°W, SS497862		Medieval	GM043
Penrice Castle, Gower	Penrice Castle	Castle	Penrice	51.5752°N 4.1702°W, SS497884		Medieval	GM047
	Penrice Ringwork	Ringwork	Penrice	51.5693°N 4.1769°W, SS492878		Medieval	GM053
	Tower NE of Oxwich Castle	Tower	Penrice	51.5562°N 4.1672°W, SS498863		Medieval	GM472
	Site of St Teilo's Old Parish Church	Church	Pontardulais	51.7079°N 4.0497°W, SN584030	Site of St Teilo's Old Parish Church, Llandeilo, Talybont. The church was removed to St Fagans National History Museum	Medieval	GM415
	St Maurice's Church	Church	Port Eynon	51.5794°N 4.2111°W, SS468890		Medieval	GM156
	Remains of Medieval Building & Church at Rhossili	Building (Unclassified)	Rhossili	51.5716°N 4.2879°W, SS415883		Medieval	GM414
	Scott's Pit Engine House & Traces of Ancillary Buildings	Engine house	Birchgrove	51.6683°N 3.8854°W, SS697982		Post-Medieval/Modern	GM336
	St Peter's Chapel & Well, Caswell Bay	Chapel	Bishopston	51.5764°N 4.0355°W, SS590883		Post-Medieval/Modern	GM374
	Morfa Bridge and Quays	Bridge	Bonymaen	51.6418°N 3.9319°W, SS664954		Post-Medieval/Modern	GM392
	Clydach Upper Forge	Industrial monument	Clydach	51.7009°N 3.9015°W, SN686019		Post-Medieval/Modern	GM497
	Melin Mynach, Gorseinon	Mill	Gorseinon	51.6726°N 4.0366°W, SS592990		Post-Medieval/Modern	GM501
	Parc le Breos Limekiln and Quarries	Limekiln	Ilston	51.5887°N 4.1119°W, SS537898		Post-Medieval/Modern	GM536
Hafod Copper Works Musgrave Engine and Rolls	Industrial monument	Landore	51.6374°N 3.9351°W, SS661949		Post-Medieval/Modern	GM483	
	Landore New Quay	Quay	Landore	51.6459°N 3.9341°W, SS662958		Post-Medieval/Modern	GM484
Remains of Morris Castle, looking towards Swansea	Morris Castle	Building (Unclassified)	Landore	51.6504°N 3.9389°W, SS659964		Post-Medieval/Modern	GM371
Whitford Point Lighthouse	Whiteford Lighthouse	Lighthouse	Llangennith, Llanmadoc and Cheriton	51.6526°N 4.2509°W, SS443972	Iron Lighthouse at Whitford Point	Post-Medieval/Modern	GM407
	Penclawdd Sea Dock and Canal	Dockyard	Llanrhidian Higher	51.6447°N 4.0933°W, SS552960		Post-Medieval/Modern	GM398
Engine House at Scott's Pit, Birchgrove, Swansea	Gwernllwynchwyth Engine House	Engine house	Llansamlet	51.6653°N 3.8849°W, SS697979		Post-Medieval/Modern	GM430
	Townshend's Great Leat & Waggonway	Industrial monument	Llansamlet	51.6647°N 3.8862°W, SS696978		Post-Medieval/Modern	GM468
	Clyne Valley Shaft Mounds	Coal Mine	Mumbles	51.6086°N 4.0095°W, SS609918		Post-Medieval/Modern	GM455
Chimney from the 18th century arsenic works	Clyne Wood Arsenic & Copper Works	Industrial monument	Mumbles	51.5996°N 4.0014°W, SS614908		Post-Medieval/Modern	GM475
	Clyne Wood Coal Level	Coal Mine	Mumbles	51.6029°N 4.0043°W, SS612912		Post-Medieval/Modern	GM464
Winding mechanism, Ynys Colliery, Clyne Valley Country Park.	Clyne Wood Colliery Steam Winding Machine	Industrial monument	Mumbles	51.6096°N 4.0185°W, SS603920		Post-Medieval/Modern	GM469
	Ynys Pit & Leat	Aqueduct	Mumbles	51.6103°N 4.0042°W, SS613920		Post-Medieval/Modern	GM461
	Limestone Quarry and Kiln at Oxwich	Limekiln	Penrice	51.5566°N 4.1676°W, SS498864		Post-Medieval/Modern	GM542
	Culver Hole Dovecot	Dovecote	Port Eynon	51.5394°N 4.2141°W, SS465845		Post-Medieval/Modern	GM325
Port Eynon - The Salt House	The Salthouse, Port Eynon	Saltworks	Port Eynon	51.5398°N 4.2084°W, SS469846		Post-Medieval/Modern	GM471
	Foxhole River Staithes	Staithes	St Thomas	51.6302°N 3.9332°W, SS662941		Post-Medieval/Modern	GM482
	White Rock Copper Works	Industrial monument	St Thomas	51.6354°N 3.9333°W, SS662947		Post-Medieval/Modern	GM481
	Penllergaer Orchideous House	Garden building	Penllergaer	51.671°N 3.991°W, SS624987		Post Medieval/Modern	GM596
Astronomical Observatory at former Penllergaer Estate	Remains of Astronomical Observatory at Penllergaer	Observatory	Penllergaer	51.6737°N 3.9933°W, SS622990		Post-Medieval/Modern	GM410
	Oxwich Bay Coast Defence/Chain Home Low Radar Station	Radar Station	Penrice	51.5435°N 4.1518°W, SS508849		Post-Medieval/Modern	GM602

== See also ==
- List of Cadw properties
- List of castles in Wales
- List of hill forts in Wales
- Historic houses in Wales
- List of monastic houses in Wales
- List of museums in Wales
- List of Roman villas in Wales
