= Nolton Haven =

Village in Pembrokeshire, Wales

Coordinates: 51.83°N 5.11°W

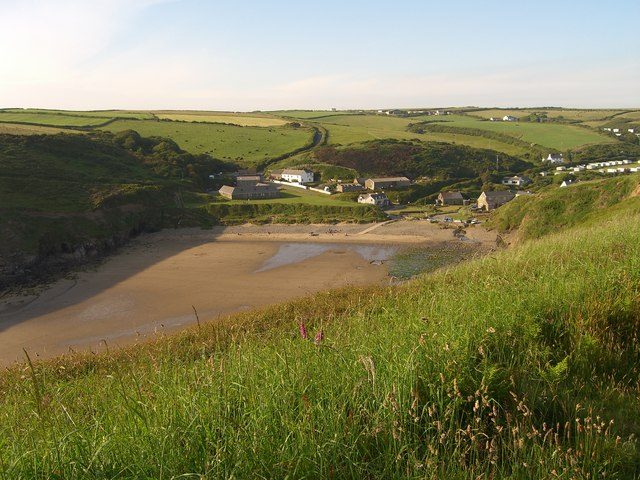

- Location within Pembrokeshire
- OS grid reference: SM859187
- Community: Nolton and Roch
- Principal area: Pembrokeshire
- Country: Wales
- Sovereign state: United Kingdom
- Police: Dyfed-Powys
- Fire: Mid and West Wales
- Ambulance: Welsh

Nolton Haven is a hamlet halfway along the coast of St Brides Bay in Pembrokeshire, Wales. It is included within the Pembrokeshire Coast National Park. Together with the larger inland village of Nolton which is about 1 km to the southeast and the village of Roch, Nolton Haven falls within Nolton and Roch community.

== Amenities ==
The community is little more than a cluster of houses and a pub next to a shingle cove. The Pembrokeshire Coast Path runs through the village. Since May 2012 this route has also formed a part of the Wales Coast Path. An on-road section of route 4 of the National Cycle Network also runs through Nolton Haven.

== Geology ==
Nolton Haven lies at the westernmost edge of the Pembrokeshire Coalfield. The local rocks which form a partly fault-bound outlier of the main coalfield which lies to the south, are assigned to the Pennant Sandstone Formation. They largely comprise a faulted series of mudstones, siltstones and sandstones with thin and contorted coal seams known locally as 'veins'. Coal was mined during the nineteenth and early twentieth century at two sites east of the village known as Nolton Colliery and at the Black Cliff (Rickets Head) Colliery north of the village. The Cliff and Folly veins were the most significant coal-producing seams. The strata were folded during the Variscan Orogeny and frequently dip at 20 to 30 degrees whilst several faults outcrop in the cliffs on the north side of the bay.
