= Jasmine Joyce-Butchers =

Welsh rugby union and sevens player

- Born: 9 October 1995 (age 31) St Davids, Pembrokeshire, Wales
- Height: 1.70 m (5 ft 7 in)
- Weight: 61 kg (134 lb)
- School: Ysgol Dewi Sant
- University: University of Wales Trinity Saint David; Cardiff Metropolitan University

Rugby union career
- Position: Wing
- Current team: Bristol Bears Women
Senior career
Years	Team	Apps	(Points)
2010–2020	Scarlets		
2020−	Bristol Bears		(60)
International career
Years	Team	Apps	(Points)
2017–	Wales	53	(50)
- Correct as of 24 September 2025
National sevens teams
Years	Team		Comps
2015–	Wales		
2015–	Great Britain		
Medal record
Women's rugby sevens
Representing Great Britain
European Games
Gold medal – first place	2023 Kraków–Małopolska	Team competition

Jasmine Joyce-Butchers (née Joyce; born 9 October 1995) is a Welsh rugby union player who plays wing for the Wales women's national rugby union team, Team GB and Bristol Bears. She made her debut for the Wales national squad in 2017, and represented them at the 2021 Women's Six Nations Championship.

== Club career ==
Joyce began playing rugby at the age of seven, first joining the mini-section of St. Davids RFC before moving to the women's youth team at Haverfordwest RFC aged 12.

At 15, her skills were spotted by talent scouts for the Scarlets, and she joined the Scarlets women's under 18s programme. After impressing with her speed in training she was placed on the wing, and scored three tries on her full debut against the Dragons. She quickly became an integral part of the under 18s team and soon progressed to the senior squad.

Joyce then signed with her current club, the Bristol Bears, in 2020.

== International career ==
Joyce has been active within international rugby since 2013, when she was selected as part of the Wales A Squad for the UK school games. From there she was called into the Welsh squad to train for the extended Six Nations Wales squad. In 2015, just three months into her studies at Cardiff Metropolitan University, Joyce was selected to play for the Wales women's national rugby sevens team for the Dubai Sevens tournament. From that point she was a regular to the women's sevens team and played for Wales at the 2015 European Championships that was held over two legs in Russia and France.

In 2016, Joyce was one of the first British women – and the only Welsh woman on the Great Britain women's rugby sevens team – to play rugby on the Olympic stage after the sport was reintroduced for Rio 2016. She was then selected for the Wales 2016/17 Six Nations squad where she made two appearances, making her debut against Scotland in 2017.

Joyce then went on to represent Wales at the 2017 Rugby World Cup and the 2018 Commonwealth Games. Following her appearance at the 2021 Women's Six Nations Championship, she was called up to the Team GB sevens squad ahead of the 2021 Olympic Games in Tokyo.

Joyce has won 19 caps in her rugby career to date. She was selected in Wales squad for the 2021 Rugby World Cup in New Zealand.

In June 2024, she was named in the British squad for the 2024 Paris Olympics and became the first British women rugby player to be selected for three separate Games. The team finished seventh. She was named in the Welsh fifteens side for the 2025 Six Nations Championship in March.

On 11 August 2025, she was selected in the Welsh squad to the Women's Rugby World Cup in England.

== Personal life ==
Born in St Davids in Wales, Joyce attended Ysgol Dewi Sant before moving to Cardiff Metropolitan University.

After three years as a personal trainer, Joyce decided to move into teaching, and started studying for a PGCE at the University of Wales Trinity Saint David in Swansea. She attributes her motivation to teach to her own primary school PE teacher. In an interview with Wales247, she said: "My PE teacher Rachael Thomas was one of the driving forces which led me to where I am now. I've always wanted to train to be a teacher probably because of the good experiences I had at both my primary and secondary schools. In particular Rachael was an amazing support when I started my rugby training, encouraging me to succeed."

In December 2023 she married her Bristol and Wales teammate Alisha Butchers.

She competed for Great Britain at the 2024 Summer Olympics.
