= Penrhiw Priory =

Historic building in St. Davids, Wales

Coordinates: 51.8867°N 5.2695°W

Penrhiw Priory was originally built as a vicarage in St Davids, Pembrokeshire, Wales, in 1884. The building was enlarged in the 1960s, serving for a time as a priory. In 2008 The Retreats Group Trust bought the building and commissioned Acanthus Holden Architects it undertake its conversion into a hotel. Then in 2012, Penrhiw Priory reopened as an eight-bedroom hotel restored along with Roch Castle and Twr y Felin Hotel, by the Griffiths Roch Foundation, which was set up in 2009 by international architect Keith Griffiths. It is a Grade-II listed building.

The Priory's Garden Bedroom was used by the vicar who was placed here by the Church of England in 1882 to stem the migration to non-conformist chapels. The stables housed his horses and carriage which enabled him to visit parishioners to entice them back to the church.
