= Pen-clawdd (electoral ward) =

Coordinates: 51.63481°N 4.11103°W

Pen-clawdd Ward
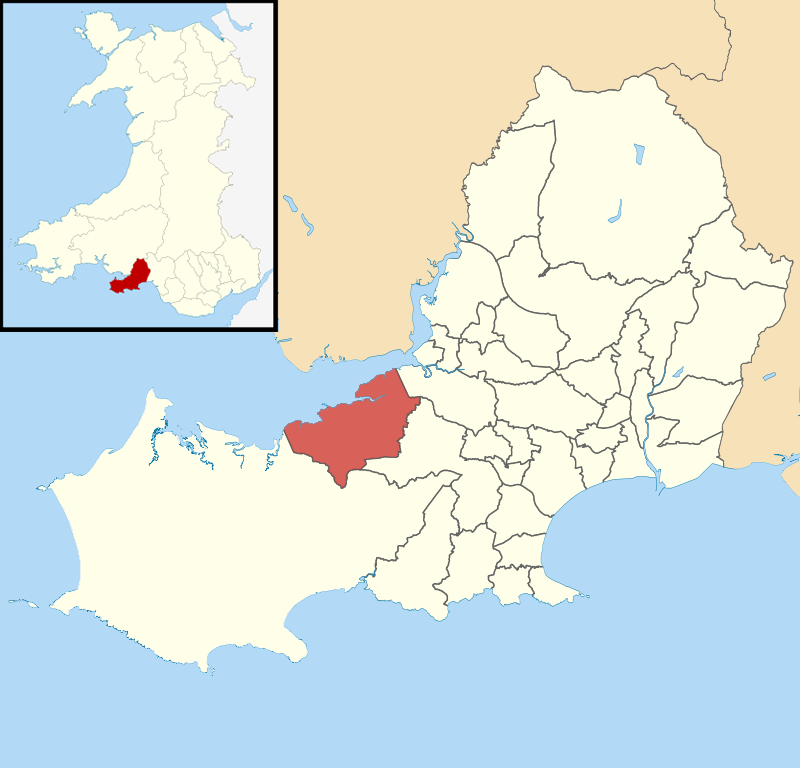
- Location of Pen-clawdd within the City and County of Swansea
- Area: 14.27 km^{2} (5.51 sq mi)
- Population: 3,635 (2011 census)
  - Density: 255/km^{2} (660/sq mi)
- Principal area: Swansea
- Preserved county: West Glamorgan
- Country: Wales
- Sovereign state: United Kingdom
- UK Parliament: Gower
- Senedd Cymru – Welsh Parliament: Gŵyr Abertawe
- Councillors: Mark Thomas (Labour)

Pen-clawdd (formerly Penclawdd) is an electoral ward in the City and County of Swansea, Wales, UK. It is named after the village of Penclawdd, which falls within the ward.

The electoral ward consists of some or all of the following areas: Blue Anchor, Penclawdd, Llanmorlais, Crofty and Wernffrwd in the parliamentary constituency of Gower. The ward is mainly rural and is fairly sparsely populated. It is bounded by Gower to the south west, and Fairwood; Gowerton to the east and the Loughor estuary to the north.

In 2022 the ward was officially renamed Pen-clawdd on the recommendation of the Welsh Language Commissioner.

== 2012 election ==
For the 2012 local council elections, the turnout was 46.58%. The results were:

Candidate	Party	Votes	Status
Mark Thomas	Labour	819	Labour gain
David Tucker	Independent	493	
Carole Hyde	Conservatives	89	
