= Llangennith, Llanmadoc and Cheriton =

Coordinates: 51°36′38″N 4°15′48″W

- Community
- Principal area: Swansea
- Country: Wales
- Sovereign state: United Kingdom
- Police: South Wales
- Fire: Mid and West Wales
- Ambulance: Welsh
- List of places UK Wales Swansea Map of the community

Llangennith, Llanmadoc and Cheriton is a rural community on the Gower Peninsula, Swansea, south Wales. It comprises the villages of Llangennith, Llanmadoc and Cheriton. Together they share a community council.

The community is bordered by Rhossili and Port Eynon to the south, Llanrhidian Lower and Reynoldston to the east.

The population was 882 in 2011.

The community includes the island of Burry Holms.
