= Cuffern Manor, Pembrokeshire =

Coordinates: 51.8505°N 5.0590°W

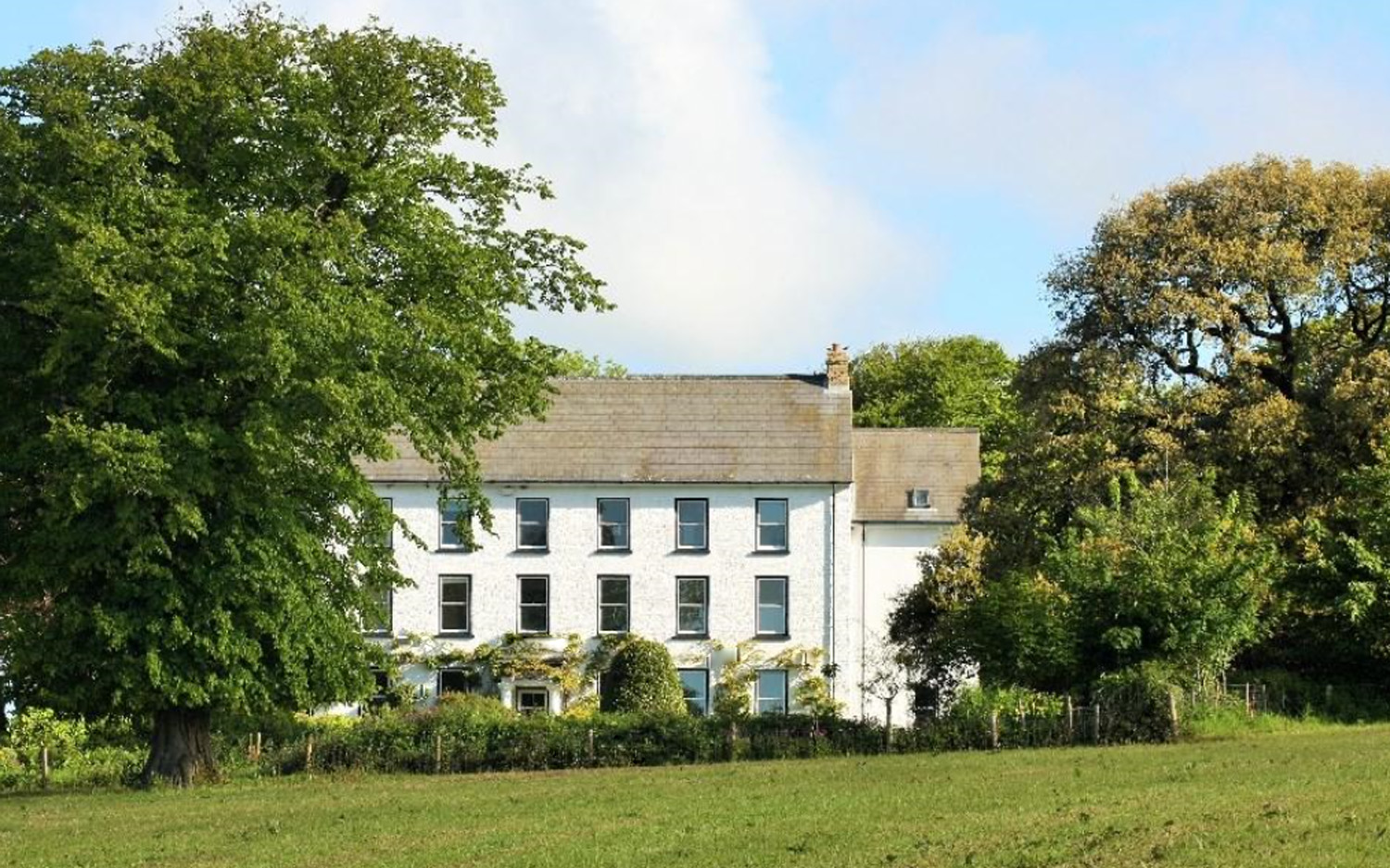
Cuffern Manor in 2017

Cuffern Manor in Roch, Pembrokeshire is a house of historical significance and is listed on the Wales Heritage Register. It was built in 1770 by John Rees Stokes shortly after he inherited a fortune from his cousin. It remained in the Stokes family for the next 150 years. Today it provides bed and breakfast accommodation and caters for special events, particularly weddings.

== Stokes family ==
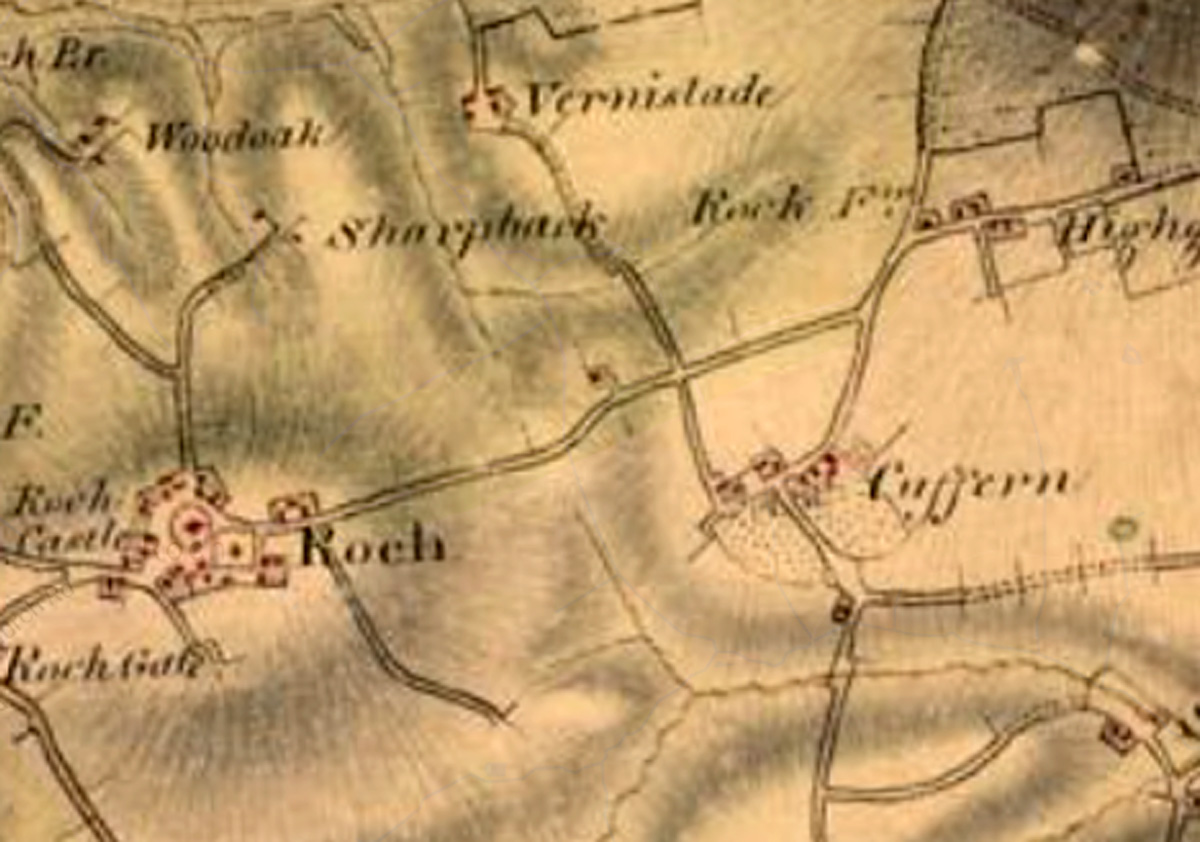
Map of Cuffern Manor in 1810

John Rees Stokes, who built Cuffern Manor in 1770, was born John Rees. He added the additional name of Stokes when he inherited a fortune from his cousin John Stokes of Roch Castle. John Stokes and his wife Elizabeth had no children and therefore to continue the Stokes name it was a condition of the Will that the next male heir adopt the name. As part of his inheritance John Rees (sometimes spelt Rhys) Stokes also became the owner of Roch Castle which remained in his family for many years.

In 1775 he married Frances Warren who was the daughter of John Warren, Mayor of Haverfordwest and Elizabeth Picton. The couple had three children – two sons and a daughter.

In 1813 George Nicholson who wrote travel guides described Cuffern Manor in the following terms.

Cuffern is a handsome modern mansion upon rising ground commanding in front views of Haverfordwest, Picton Castle and some reaches of Milford Haven. To the west can be seen Brides Bay and Roch Castle.

The eldest son was John Stokes Stokes, and when John Rees Stokes died in 1817 he inherited the house. In about 1812 he married Martha Bowen who was the daughter of Reverend James Bowen of Rosecrowther. The couple had four children – one son and three daughters. He became the coroner for the lower division of Pembrokeshire and the Deputy-Lieutenant. He died in 1844 and his son John Stokes inherited his property.

John Stokes was born in 1818 at Cuffern. He succeeded his father as coroner of the district in 1842. In 1847 at Bloomsbury he married Sophia Elizabeth Gray, daughter of Francis Edward Gray of Elliot Vale Blackheath, Surrey. The couple had only one daughter. When John died in 1888 Sophia his wife continued to live at Cuffern until her death in 1907 at the age of 95. After her death her daughter Emma Stokes who had married Arthur Massy inherited the house thereby bringing it into the Massy family.

== Massy family ==
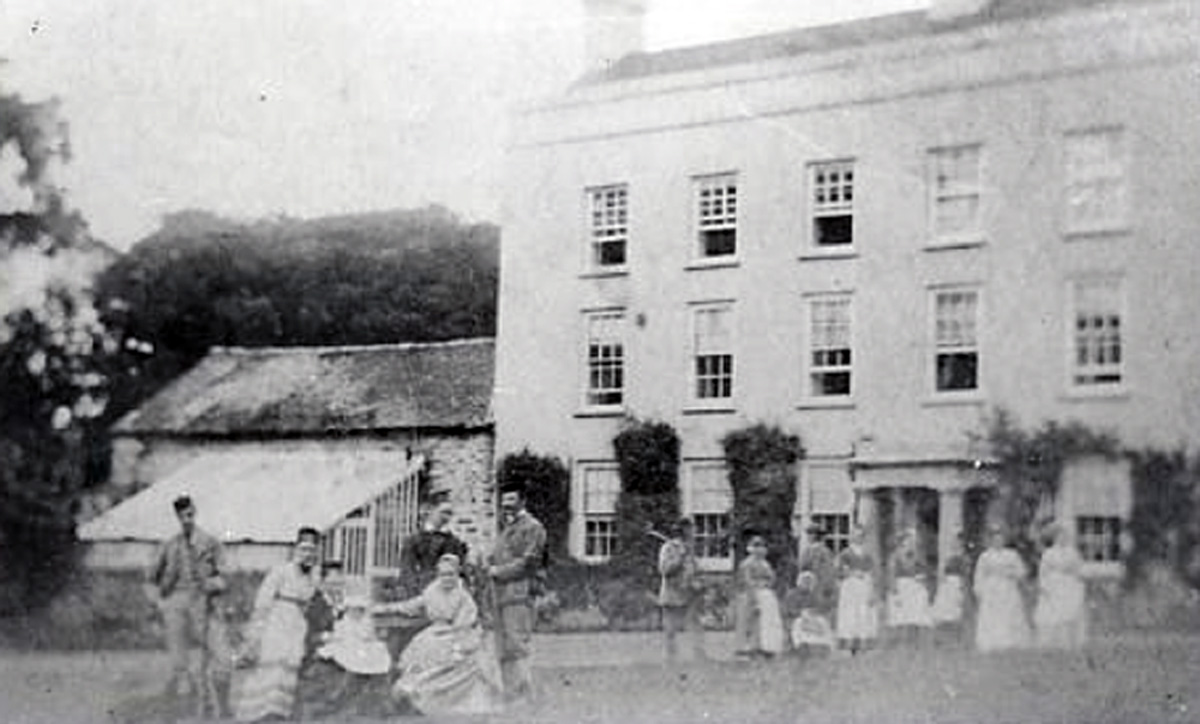
The Massy family at Cuffern Manor in about 1900

Emma Elizabeth Rhys Massy was born in 1850. In 1881 she married Arthur Wellington Massy, who was the son of Edward Taylor Massy of Cottesmore, Haverfordwest. Arthur was described as a "gentleman" who was "living on his own means". For much of the first part of their married life they lived at Cuffern with Emma's mother Sophia who was at this time very elderly. Sophia died at the advanced age of 95 in 1907 and left the house to Emma. The couple had four sons one of whom, Hugh Massy, received the award of Military Cross in 1916. A photo of the family at Cuffern is shown.

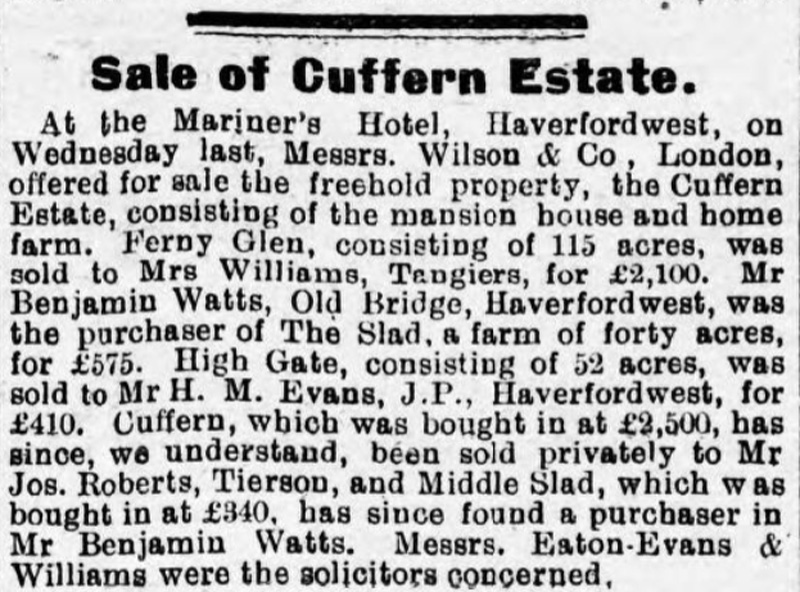
Sale information about the Cuffern Estate in 1918

The Massey family held numerous fetes on the grounds of Cuffern to raise money for the district nurses fund. One event in 1907 was described in the following terms.

Bright and sunny weather favoured the sale of work in aid of the Roch and Nolton District Nurse's Fund at Cuffern on Tuesday last, and that picturesque old mansion, with its stately trees and trim lawn, presented a gay and charming appearance. Tables had been laid out on the lower edge of the lawn, whereon the many articles contributed for sale, ranging in all varieties, from the useful to the ornamental, were tastefully displayed. Amusements had also been provided for in the shape of a shooting gallery, Aunt Sally, and a swing for the little ones.

Arthur died in 1916 and two years later Cuffern was advertised for sale. The Estate was divided up and sold in separate sections. The buyers for each section was outlined in a newspaper article which is shown. The buyer for Cuffern House was Joseph Roberts from Tierson near Milford Haven.
