= Roch, Pembrokeshire =

Coordinates: 51.8489°N 5.0778°W

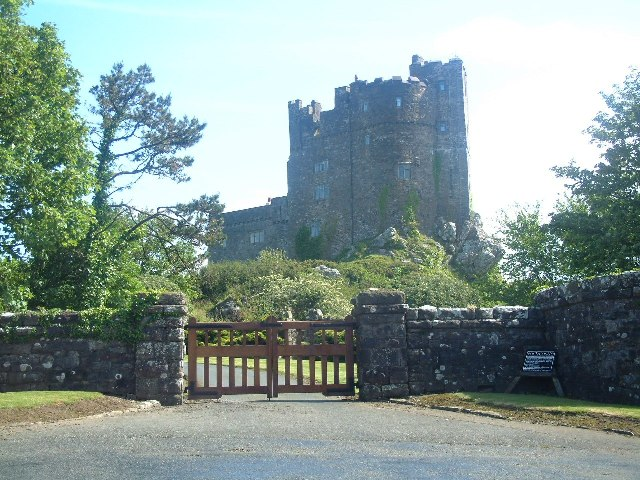
- Roch Castle

- Location within Pembrokeshire
- Community: Nolton and Roch
- Principal area: Pembrokeshire
- Country: Wales
- Sovereign state: United Kingdom
- Post town: HAVERFORDWEST
- Dialling code: 01437
- Police: Dyfed-Powys
- Fire: Mid and West Wales
- Ambulance: Welsh

Roch (Welsh: Y Garn) is a village and ecclesiastical parish 2 miles (3.5 km) northeast of Nolton and 5.5 miles (9 km) northwest of Haverfordwest. It forms part of the community of Nolton and Roch. Roch ecclesiastical parish includes the hamlets of Cuffern and Druidston.

Census population of Roch parish 538 (1801): 763 (1851): 471 (1901): 377 (1951): 684 (1981) In the 2011 census Roch village had a population of 463.

The village stands on a prominent ridge of Precambrian rhyolite.

== Name ==
The name Roch (/roʊtʃ/) is a rare example of a purely Norman French name: it was la Roche in 1271, and means "the rock". The Welsh name has the same meaning.

== Amenities ==
The village has a primary school, Roch Community School, for children aged 3 to 11.

The Victoria Hall, converted from a farm building in the late 20th century, is a village hall and community events space with a capacity of 175 people.

The village shop and post office, Roch Gate Stores, closed in 2022 after trading since the 1970s. It blamed rises in living costs. Postmaster Tim Brentnall had been a victim of the Horizon IT scandal in 2009, but eventually had his prosecution completely overturned. The shop at Rainbolts Hill Campsite was hoping to take over some of the shop's services.

== Notable buildings ==
Roch Castle is a small 13th century castle standing on top of a prominent rocky outcrop and is visible for miles around. It is a Grade I listed building. It was restored and became a family home in 1900. In 2008, it was purchased by locally-born architect Keith Griffiths and converted into a luxury hotel.

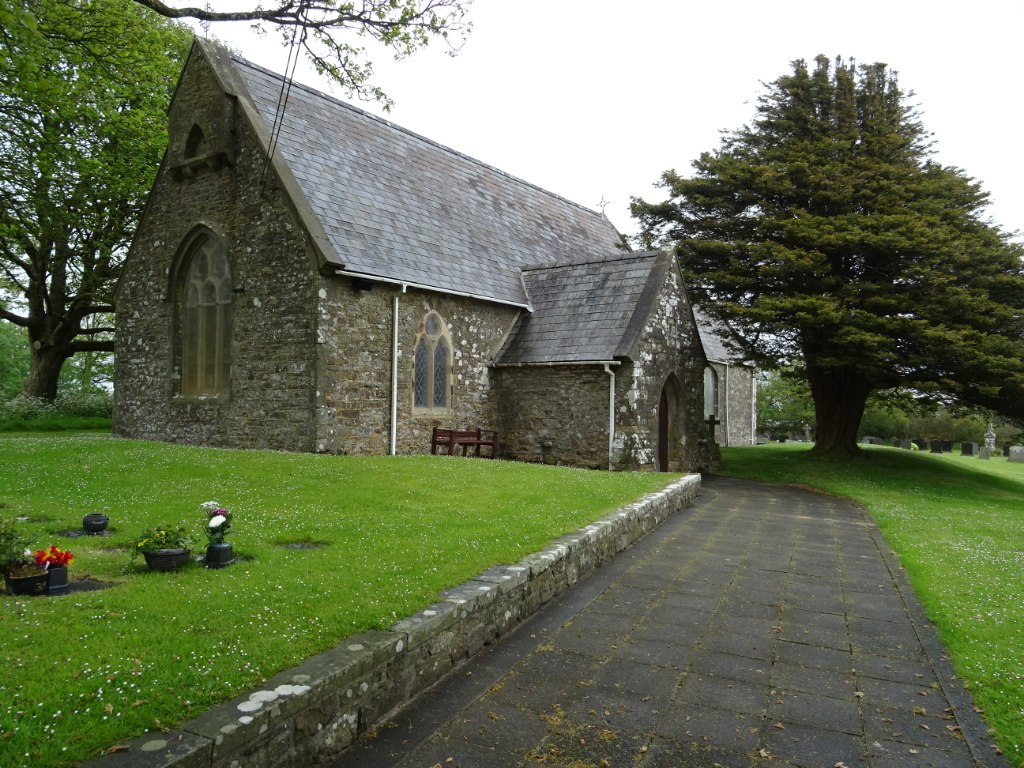
St Mary's Church

The parish church of St Mary, to the southeast of the castle, probably dates from the 13th century and now comprises a nave, south aisle and vestry. It was restored 1857-9 and has some high quality stained glass windows dating from after this time. The church is Grade II listed.

Roch Gate Motel, on the main A487 road, was developed in the 1960s on a site formerly occupied by a World War II radar station. Because of its bright pink colour it gained the nickname of the 'pink palace'. It closed in 2008 and fell into disrepair. There have been a number of proposals made to redevelop the site, including proposals in 2025 to create a restaurant, shop and holiday lodge complex.

The Victoria Inn, located on the A487 road, is a traditional pub which has been trading since 1851. It also has a microbrewery on site.

A mile to the east of the village is Cuffern Manor which is an historic house.
