= Nolton and Roch =

Community in Pembrokeshire, Wales

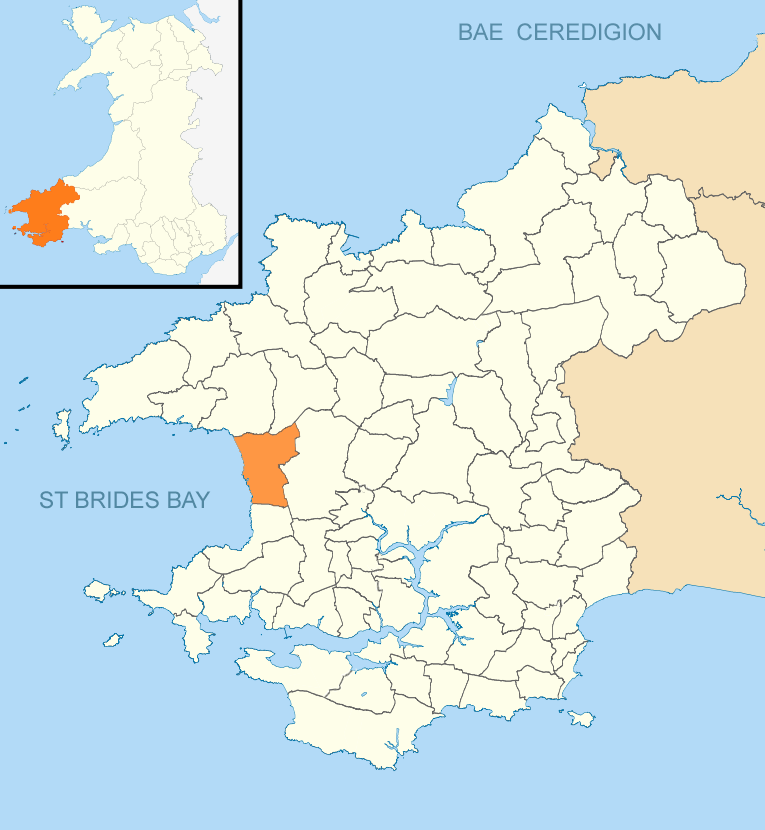
- Location of Nolton and Roch within Pembrokeshire
- Population: 825 (2012)
- OS grid reference: SM8618
- Community: Nolton and Roch
- Principal area: Pembrokeshire
- Country: Wales
- Sovereign state: United Kingdom
- Post town: Haverfordwest
- Postcode district: SA62
- Dialling code: 01834
- Police: Dyfed-Powys
- Fire: Mid and West Wales
- Ambulance: Welsh
- UK Parliament: Preseli Pembrokeshire
- Senedd Cymru – Welsh Parliament: Ceredigion Penfro
- List of places UK Wales Pembrokeshire Map of the community

Nolton and Roch (Welsh: Nolton a'r Garn) is a community in the Hundred of Roose, Pembrokeshire, Wales. The community consists essentially of the villages of Nolton and Roch and a number of hamlets including Cuffern and Druidston. The western part of the community is in the Pembrokeshire Coast National Park. Its population (2001) was 746, increasing to 825 at the 2011 census.

== Geography ==
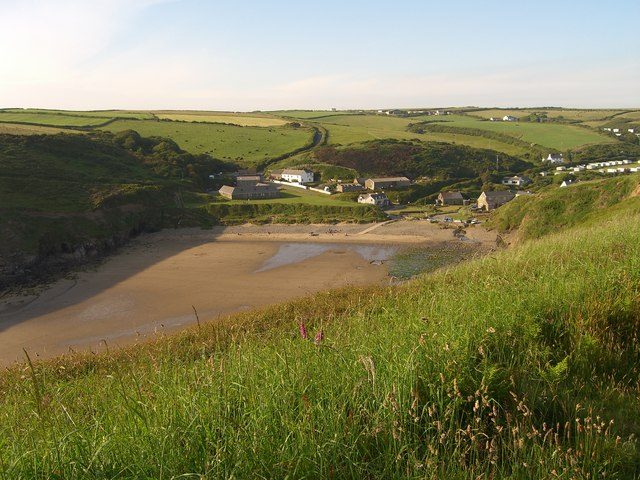
Nolton Haven

The 5 miles (8 km) coastline of the community consists of picturesque cliffs and dunes, and is followed by the Pembrokeshire Coast Path. At the north end is the 2 mile (3 km) long Newgale beach, which is popular for bathing and surfing. The whole coast is underlain with coal measures and was a centre of industry from medieval times until 1905. Nolton Haven, on the border between the two parishes, was a port from which the local anthracite was shipped. The area is now a popular destination for holidaymakers and second-home owners.

The community is on the linguistic boundary that existed along the northern edge of the community, which was particularly prominent here where it followed the Brandybrook valley: the community had been predominantly English-speaking for 900 years, but the adjoining parishes of Brawdy and Hayscastle to the north are more Welsh-speaking.

Deep in the Brandybrook valley, Roch Mill is the last remaining of five water mills along little more than two miles of river. Adjacent to Roch Bridge it has been restored and includes a working water wheel. Starting at Roch Bridge a footpath follows the Brandybrook valley east through ancient Eweston Wood, past New Mill and Tucking (woollen) Mill, both now derelict with the buildings gradually submerging into the undergrowth. The water course (leat) that brought water to the two mills can clearly be seen and, joins the two in series; having been used by Tucking Mill the water then flowed on to New Mill before returning to the Brandybrook river. The path divides with the right path following and crossing the river and back to Roch Bridge via Woodhawk Farm. The left branch continues onto a minor lane and the ford at Stoopers Mill.

== Local government ==
Nolton and Roch has its own elected community council and is part of the electoral ward of The Havens for the purposes of elections to Pembrokeshire County Council. Before the 2022 elections it was part of Camrose ward.

== Nolton ==
51°49′17″N 5°5′47″W

Nolton is a village and parish on the coast of St Brides Bay, 5.5 miles (9 km) west of Haverfordwest. The name was originally old-tun and the dedication of the church to St Madoc suggests that the place was a pre-existing Welsh settlement appropriated by English immigrants around the time of the Norman Conquest.

Census population of Nolton parish 186 (1801): 245 (1851): 160 (1901): 108 (1951): 176 (1981)

% Welsh speakers 14 (1891): 5 (1931): 8 (1971)

== Roch ==
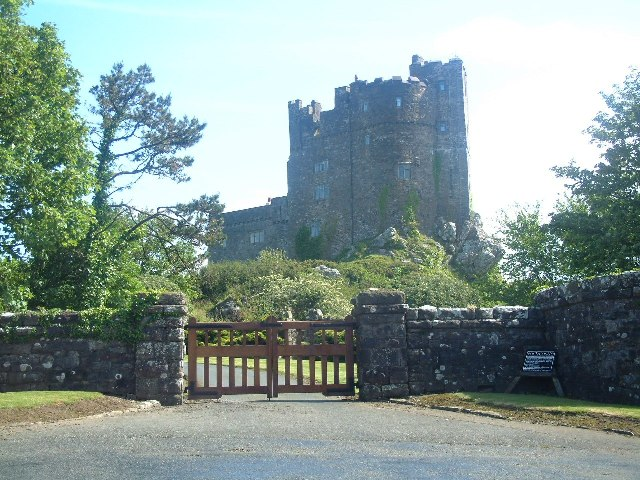
Roch Castle

Roch (Welsh: Y Garn) is a village and parish 2 miles (3.5 km) northeast of Nolton and 5.5 miles (9 km) northwest of Haverfordwest. The village stands on a prominent ridge of Precambrian rhyolite. Roch Castle stands on top of the most prominent outcrop of this, and is visible for miles around. The church of St Mary is 100 m southeast of the castle. Nearby is Cuffern Manor which is an historic house. Roch parish includes the hamlets of Cuffern and Druidston.
