= Penclawdd =

Coordinates: 51.640982°N 4.097705°W

Penclawdd: Welsh: Pen-clawdd
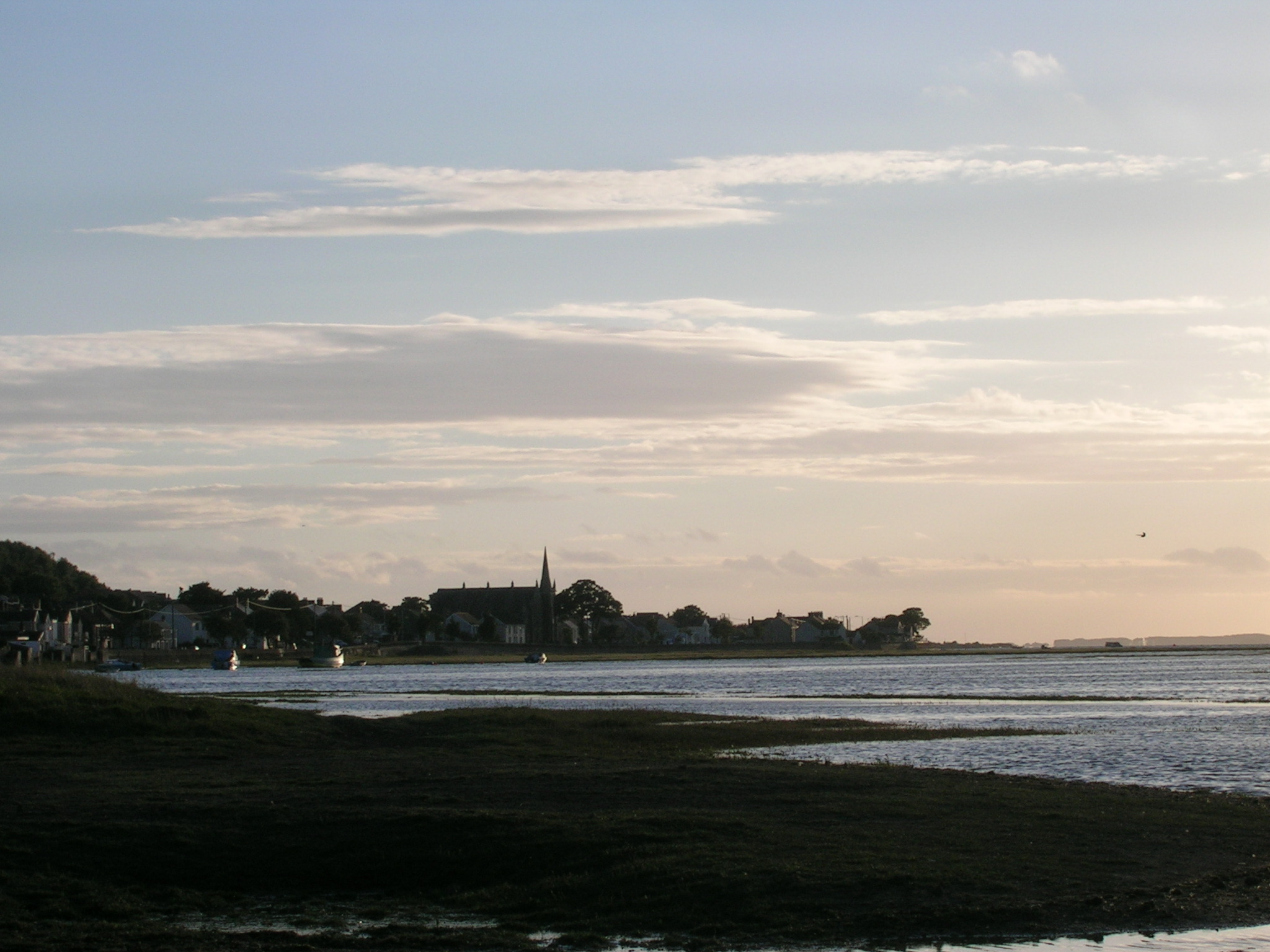

- Location within Swansea
- Population: 3,635 (2011)
- OS grid reference: SS549956
- Community: Llanrhidian Higher
- Principal area: Swansea
- Preserved county: West Glamorgan
- Country: Wales
- Sovereign state: United Kingdom
- Post town: SWANSEA
- Postcode district: SA4
- Dialling code: 01792
- Police: South Wales
- Fire: Mid and West Wales
- Ambulance: Welsh
- UK Parliament: Gower
- Senedd Cymru – Welsh Parliament: Gŵyr Abertawe

Division 3 West Winners 2005.

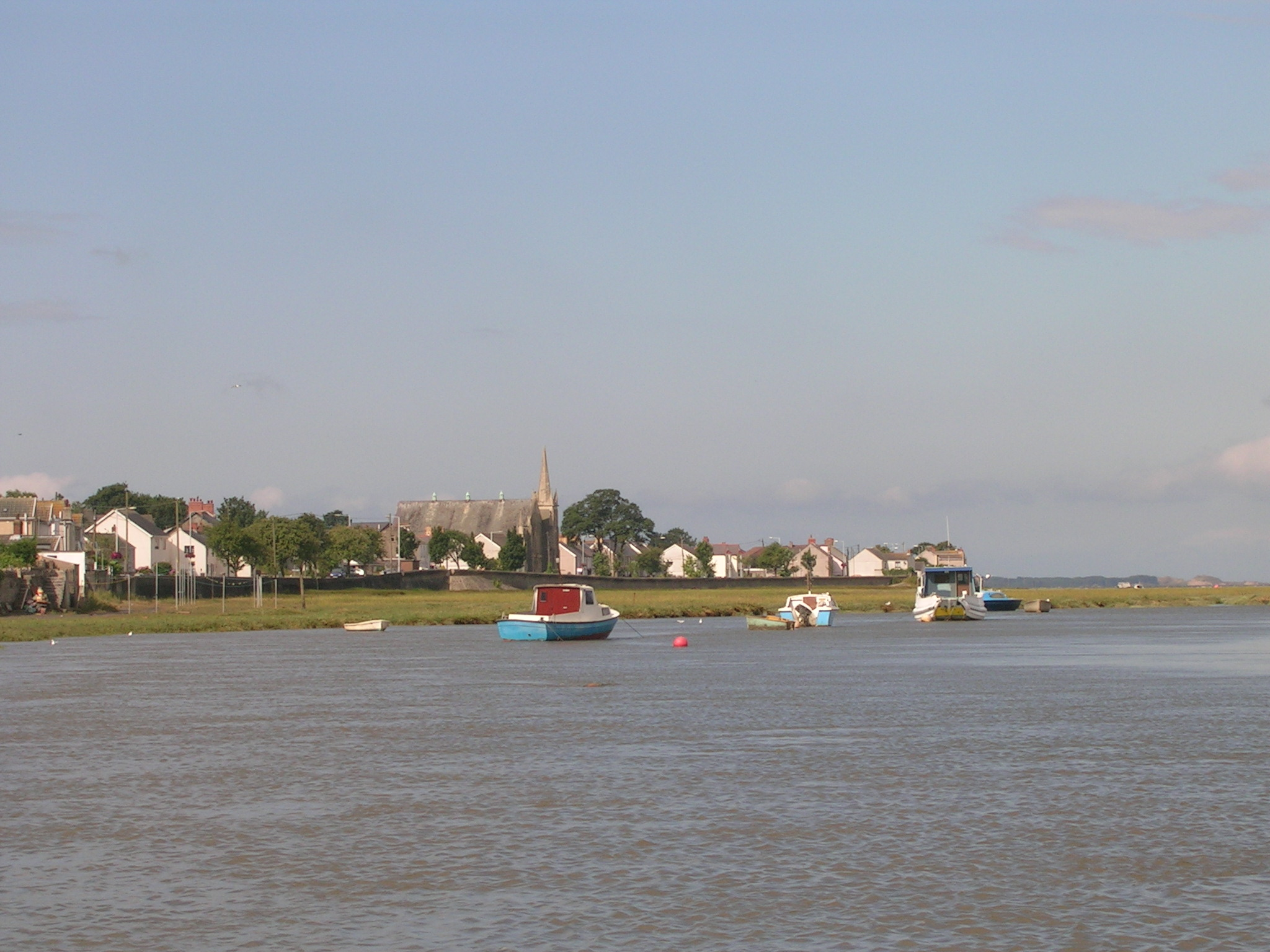
Penclawdd, Gower, South Wales .

Penclawdd (Welsh: Pen-clawdd) is a village in the north of the Gower Peninsula in the county of Swansea, Wales. Historically, it was part of Glamorgan. Penclawdd is most famous for its local cockle industry which goes back for many years to Roman times. It falls within the Penclawdd electoral ward. It is one of the larger villages on the Gower Peninsula. Part of the village is perched on a high location, enjoying panoramic views over the Loughor estuary and surrounding Gower countryside, while the main part of the village stretches along the edge of the estuary. Being so close to an estuary, Penclawdd is thriving with wildlife. It is plentiful in birdlife and with horses that roam the estuary. The built-up area had a population of 1,935.

== Brief history ==
Up until the end of the 19th century Penclawdd was a thriving sea port. The Penclawdd Canal connected to the Burry River at Aberkeddy. The village was renowned for coal mining and its extensive tinplate, copper and brass works, operated by the Cheadle Copper Company. There was a time when Penclawdd had a forge, twenty grocers, three butchers, three drapers, four fish and chip shops, eleven pubs, a cinema, the still remaining three chapels and a church and a busy railway station. The original railway platform still remains today. Also, built in 1807, a now derelict Hermon Chapel was used to help ships navigate the estuary.

Around 1800, John Vivian of Truro, Cornwall, became managing partner in the copper works at Penclawdd and Loughor then owned by the Cheadle Brasswire Company of Staffordshire. The Vivian family eventually ran large copper mining, copper smelting and trading businesses in and around Swansea (Vivian & Sons) and, throughout the 19th century, did much to develop Swansea into a city.

=== Anthrax testing in WW2 ===
At about 5p.m. on Wednesday, 28 October 1942, a Bristol Blenheim bomber crossed the Burry estuary at a height of 5,000 feet. Over the north Gower salt marshes, the plane dropped a single bomb. The local residents didn't know it, but they’d just become part of the army's biowarfare experiments.

The bombing run wasn't out of the ordinary. An artillery range had been set up in the area at the outset of the war and a number of weapons were tested there, including mustard gas.

The target for this bomb was once again sheep. Three pounds of liquid anthrax spores detonated on the sandy ground of the Burry Inlet, upwind of two tethered lines of sixty animals.

Two of the sheep died of anthrax poisoning. Others fell sick but recovered. All the surviving sheep were slaughtered after seven days and their bodies buried at the edge of the estuary marshland. The scientists believed that the incoming and outgoing tide had disinfected the land and no warnings were required. The remainder of the army's anthrax experiments moved back to Gruinard. The people of Penclawdd were left none the wiser what had happened in their own backyard.

==== The aftermath of the bomb ====
It wasn't until 1982 that Keith H. Hopkins, secretary of the local Labour Party, went to the media to address local rumours about the bombing. Hopkins had three demands.

- Soil testing on non-tidal land around the estuary
- Evidence of any anthrax-related infections in animals and people in the area
- A public inquiry.

In January 1987, Parliament finally confirmed what Penclawdd residents already knew. Their estuary was used for anthrax testing during the war. The records had been designated Top Secret until 1975. In 1987, with the public confirmation the bombing had happened, the records were downgraded to Restricted status. They weren't made public until 1999.

Apart from work carried out within the then chemical defence experimental station, Porton Down, a device containing anthrax was tested on the beach at Penclawdd, South Wales, in 1942. Investigations subsequent to this trial revealed no evidence of any residual contamination.

— Archie Hamilton, MP, House of Commons, 29 January 1987

At the time of the experiments, scientists believed that the tide had "effectively decontaminated" the entire area. The locals were not convinced. Mass cockle die-offs in the estuary in 2009 again reignited the debate about whether or not the area was contaminated with anthrax. Llanelli MP Nia Griffith again demanded answers from the Ministry of Defence, which repeated the same assurances. "There was no residual contamination of the site as it was washed by the incoming tide."

== Penclawdd RFC ==
Penclawdd RFC, nicknamed the Donks, have a long history in rugby union. Penclawdd RFC officially formed in 1888, but rugby has been played in the village since the 1880 / 1881 season, the same year as the founding of the Welsh Rugby Union. In its formative years the club had no permanent pitch, but played on suitable available ground in various areas of the village. Haydn Tanner is one of the club's most famous players, playing for Wales and the British Lions in 1938. Willie Davies, another famous Penclawdd Welsh rugby union international went North and played rugby league for Bradford Northern in the 1930s and 1940s. He won the Lance Todd Trophy for the out standing player in the Challenge cup final at Wembley in 1947. He represented Great Britain at rugby league on the famous Indomitable's tour to Australia in 1946.

The club is still thriving today, recently celebrating 125 years of rugby being played at Penclawdd and the first team is currently competing in the Division 2 South West league of the WRU, the 2nds in the Swansea and district league, and the Youth play in the osprey rugby trust leagues.

== Local delicacies ==
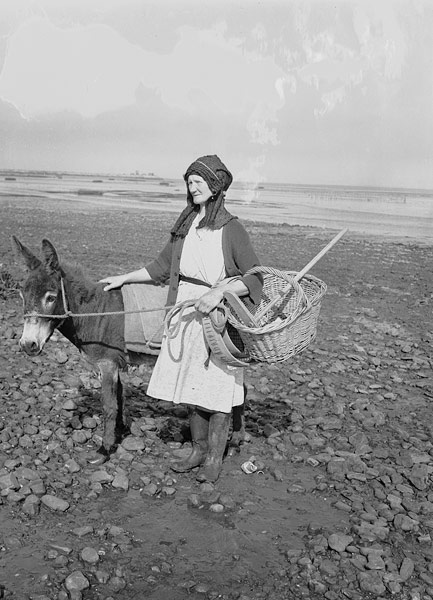
Cockle harvester and donkey in 1951

Penclawdd is famous for its cockle industry which has been a part of local life since at least the Roman period.

Cockles are collected from the extensive sandy flats in the Burry Estuary and the cockles harvested there are sold worldwide. Up until the 1970s, cockle gathering was a traditional female occupation with women using hand-rakes and riddles (coarse sieves) with the help of donkey carts.

The cockles were processed in small, family-owned factories. Although the Penclawdd factories have since been demolished, there are surviving units in the village of Crofty, especially on New Road. Today the harvesting is done mostly by men, often using tractors or Land Rovers and processed in two large, modern factories in Crofty.

Penclawdd cockles are often associated with Swansea Market, and a number of stalls within the market still sell the product. Today the product can be bought in shops and supermarkets throughout Wales but most are exported to continental Europe.

Other local delicacies include laverbread (laver seaweed Porphyra umbilicalis washed and boiled; it is eaten dipped in oatmeal and fried in bacon fat) and salt marsh lamb. All of these and more examples of Welsh cuisine are sold at an award-winning local Penclawdd produce market.

== People ==
Composer Karl Jenkins was born and raised in Penclawdd.
