= Ysgol Dewi Sant =

Coordinates: 51.882°N 5.256°W

Ysgol Dewi Sant St Davids School
- St Davids, Pembrokeshire, SA62 6QH; Wales

Information
- Type: State Comprehensive
- Established: 1895
- Local authority: Pembrokeshire County Council
- Ofsted: Reports
- Headteacher: Rachael Thomas
- Gender: Coeducational
- Age: 11 to 18
- Colours: Black and amber
- Website: www.ysgolpenrhyndewi.cymru

Ysgol Dewi Sant was a secondary school in St Davids, Pembrokeshire, Wales.

== Description ==
The school had served the historic city of St Davids and an extensive rural area prior to merging with.

The 2007 Estyn Inspection report commended its strong GCSE and A Levels curriculum.

== Closure threats ==
In 2013 Ysgol Dewi Sant was under review for potential closure, though it was ranked top Welsh school on the Western Mail Real Schools Guide. In December 2014 it was removed from the Estyn list of schools in need of improvement, having improved its teaching across the ability range, and improved security by building a new reception and carrying out more rigorous identity checks.

Despite this Pembrokeshire County Council arranged an extraordinary meeting for the 29 January 2015, to discuss a shake-up of education in Wales, not just Pembrokeshire, including the closure of Ysgol Dewi Sant. Over 300 people protested outside the council meeting. The council decided to keep Ysgol Dewi Sant open but review the future of the sixth form.

== Notable pupils ==
- Simon Davies, former Wales international footballer
- David Gray, singer-songwriter
- Rowland Phillips, former international rugby union player and coach
- Ian Walsh, former Wales international footballer
- Keith Griffiths (architect), Founder of Aedas
