= Keith Griffiths (architect) =

Welsh architect

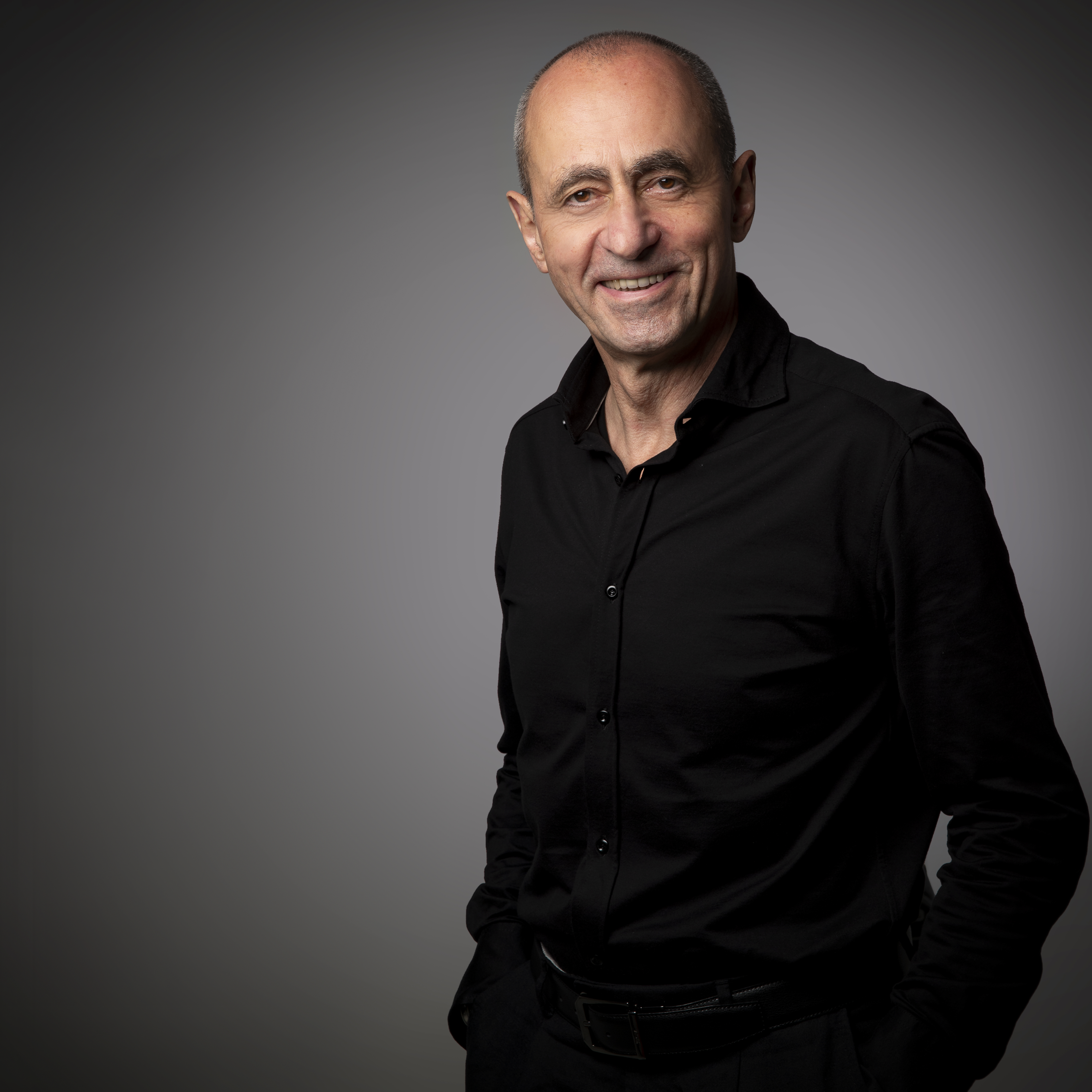
- Born: October 1954 (age 71); Merthyr Tydfil, Wales
- Occupation: Architect
- Practice: Aedas
- Website: www.aedas.com

Keith Griffiths FRIBA FHKIA (born October 1954) is a Welsh architect who founded and chairs Aedas. Since 1983 and for most of his career he has resided in Hong Kong.

== Early life and education ==
Griffiths was born to Emrys and Jane Griffiths in October 1954 in Merthyr Tydfil, Wales. He was brought up in the small cathedral city of St Davids, in Wales. He attended Ysgol Dewi Sant, St Davids School and read architecture at St John's College, Cambridge, where he received a Masters in Architecture in 1976 and a Diploma in Architecture in 1979. In 1979 he registered as an architect (ARB) and became a member of the Royal Institute of British Architects (RIBA).

== Career ==
From 1978 to 1980 Griffiths worked for Arup Associates before joining Foster and Partners in London as a member of the design team for the new Hongkong and Shanghai Bank headquarters (HSBC) in Hong Kong. In 1985, Keith Griffiths and Anthony Hackett set up Hackett and Griffiths in Hong Kong. Hackett and Griffiths first commission was the new Royal Hong Kong Yacht Club sailing Centre at Middle Island. Further commissions included Gaysorn Shopping Centre, Bangkok in 1988 for Gaysorn Property Company Ltd.

In 1992 Griffiths became a shareholder in Lang Peddle Thorpe (architects) in Hong Kong. The company established offices in Singapore in 1995 followed by China (2002), Macao (2004), Dubai (2004) and Seattle (2006) under his leadership.

Griffiths invited the UK practice of Abbey Holford Rowe to jointly own a new design company and in 2002 Griffiths rebranded the company as Aedas. In 2012, the former Abbey Holford Rowe left Aedas and in 2015, Aedas acquired UK practice RHWL and Arts Team.

From 2007 to 2026, Griffiths served a Non-Executive Director of the Link Management Ltd in Hong Kong.

He established the Griffiths-Roch Foundation in 2009 to acquire and restore the important historic buildings in Wales, Twr y Felin Art Hotel, Roch Castle and Penrhiw Priory under Retreats Group.

== Honours ==
Griffiths was awarded a fellowship of the Hong Kong Institute of Architects (HKIA) in 2001. In 2012, Griffiths was named Honorary Fellow of University of Wales, Trinity Saint David in recognition of his contribution in restoring historic buildings in Wales. In 2014, Cardiff University named Griffiths an Honorary Fellow . He was awarded s fellowship of the Royal Institute of British Architects and recognised as one of the Top 100 Influential People in 2026.

== Source ==
- Sinclair, Kevin (2005). Making Connections: Aedas architects in Asia. Aedas. ISBN 978-9-889-88080-4.
