= Cefn Bryn =

Ridge in Swansea, Wales

Coordinates: 51°34′48″N 4°08′25″W

Summit of Cefn Bryn

Cefn Bryn is an ancient ridge in Britain. It is a 5-mile-long Old Red Sandstone ridge in south Wales, in the heart of the Gower Peninsula, in the City and County of Swansea. Local people colloquially refer to it as the "backbone of Gower", as it protrudes from surrounding limestone. The highest point on the ridge (188m/617 ft ) is the second highest point in the peninsula, offering panoramic views of the surrounding country and seas. The swathes of grassland around the ridge are known as Cefn Bryn Common.

Along the ridge of the hill, banked by grassy common on both sides is the road from Cilibion to Reynoldston. The road was previously known as the Old Coal Road and Red Road. Wandering sheep, wild ponies and cows can be seen along the road. Large swells and dips can be encountered along the route, formed by swallets and sinkholes in the surrounding limestone. The highest point of the road intersects with the ridge summit.

== Arthur's Stone ==
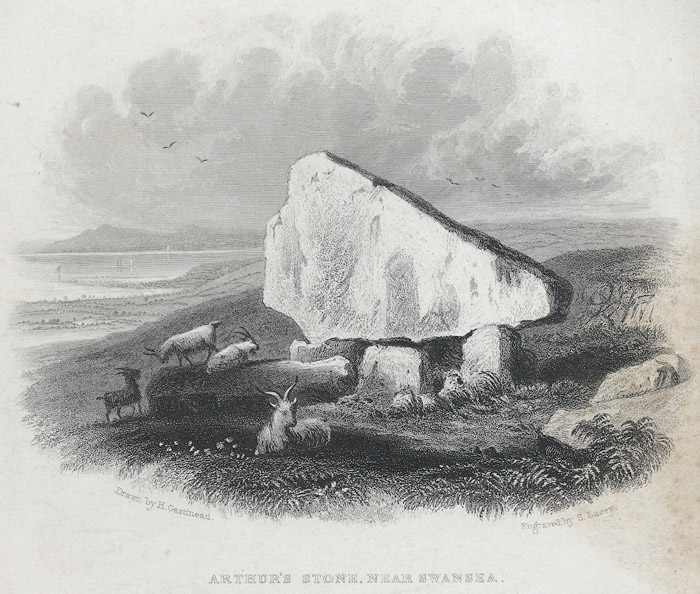
Arthur's stone, near Swansea as depicted c. 1840

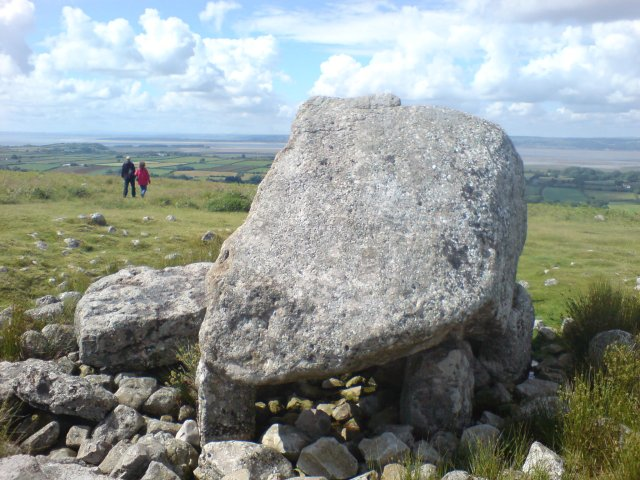
Arthur's Stone

Just north of the ridge summit of Cefn Bryn, there is a Neolithic burial ground, known as "Arthur's Stone" (Welsh: Maen Ceti). Its name comes from a legend that the ancient British King Arthur threw a large stone from Llanelli which landed on this spot.

It is believed that during the Bronze Age Cefn Bryn was used extensively for ceremonies and rituals. Beneath the bracken on the hill over sixty cairns have been discovered. Most of these are likely to be no more than collections of stones cleared by local farmers; but just north-west of Arthur's Stone three prominent cairns have been excavated that prove their ancient role - the largest being Great Cairn, a circular heap of stones above a central grave.

== Broad Pool ==
Broad Pool

There is a small fresh water pool called Broad Pool at the foot of the eastern approach to the ridge. This pool is known to have existed since 1645, and has dried out and been re-excavated twice. Today it is a protected nature reserve. It lies in a shallow basin on the limestone plateau beneath Cefn Bryn, and consists of an acidic pond, heath and bog, which is important for aquatic plants, amphibians, dragonflies (including Southern Damselfly) and wetland birds.
