= Burry Holms =

Small tidal island at the northern end of the Gower Peninsula, Wales

Coordinates: 51.60952°N 4.30773°W

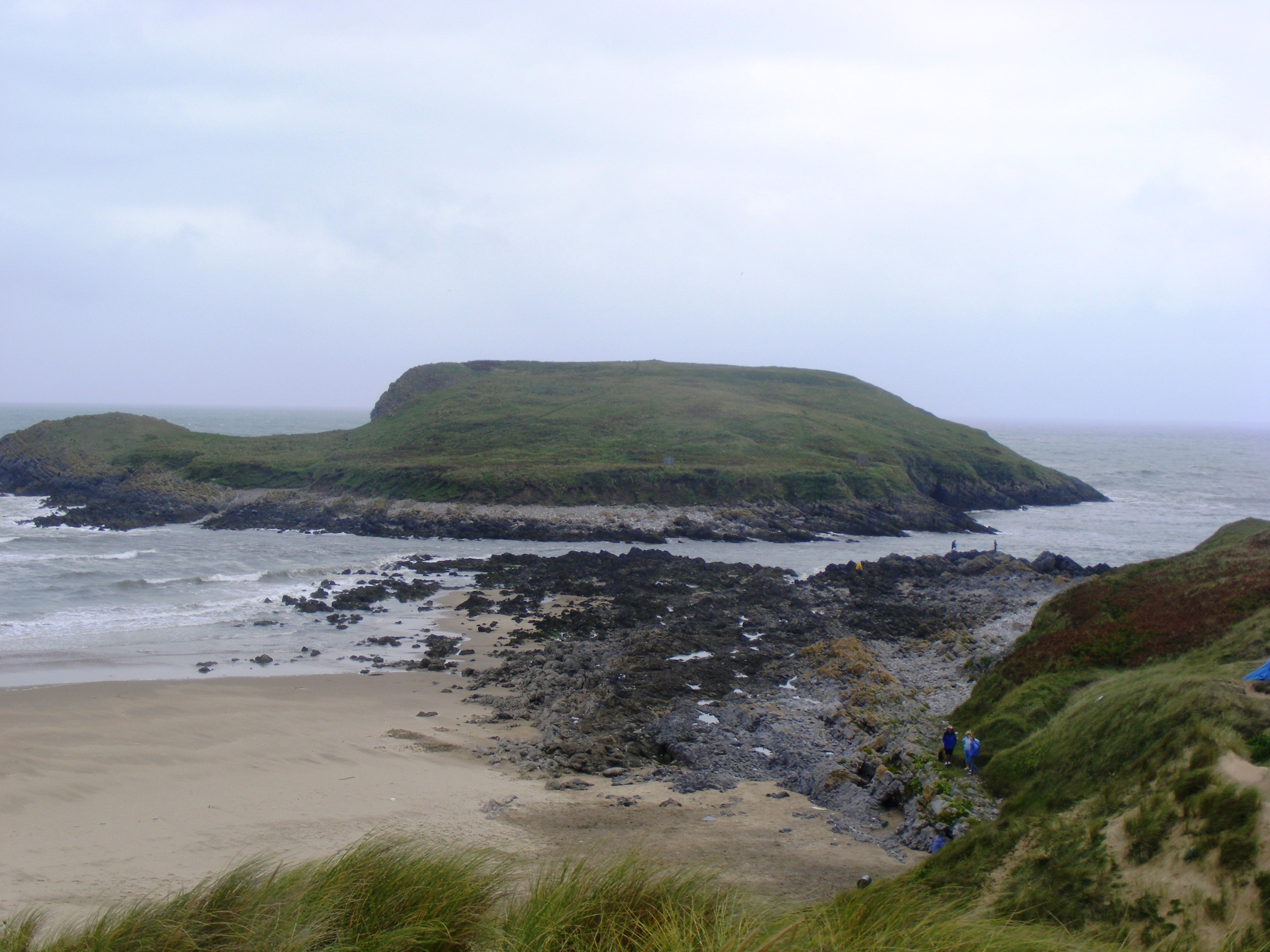
Burry Holms at high tide

Burry Holms (grid reference SS403926) (Welsh: Ynys Lanwol), a tidal island with the height of (98 feet (30 m)) is at the northern end of Rhossili Bay in the Gower Peninsula, Wales. During spring and summer, Burry Holms is covered by flowers such as thrift and sea campion.

== Etymologies ==
The island was well known within Celtic Christianity as it was heavily associated with traditions of Saint Cenydd, who is said to have lived on the island as a hermit and is linked to the contemporary archeological remains found there. As such, the island is certain to have had an identifiable name in both Old Welsh and Ecclesiastical Latin, likely using Cenydd as an eponym. Indeed, early English records give the name as "Saint Kenyth atte Holmes", suggesting that at least one of these pre-Norse conventions was still known and recorded centuries later.

"Holmes" is a common element of English place-names in Wales, ultimately deriving from the Old Norse holmr, which denotes "a small and rounded islet". The island appears as "Holmes" and "Holmes en Gower", in the Calendar of Patent rolls entries for the 1440s, where it is listed as a "chapel or hermitage". Variations on the Norse/English name continued into the modern era, with the island simply named as Holmes Island on early tithe maps (listed as a "Rectorial Glebe" of the parish of Llangennith). The Modern Welsh name, Ynys Lanwol ("tidal island") is thought to have only come into common usage in recent history, with the modern English name, Burry Holms another recent appellation with the word Burry likely referring to the island's archaeological remains.

== History ==
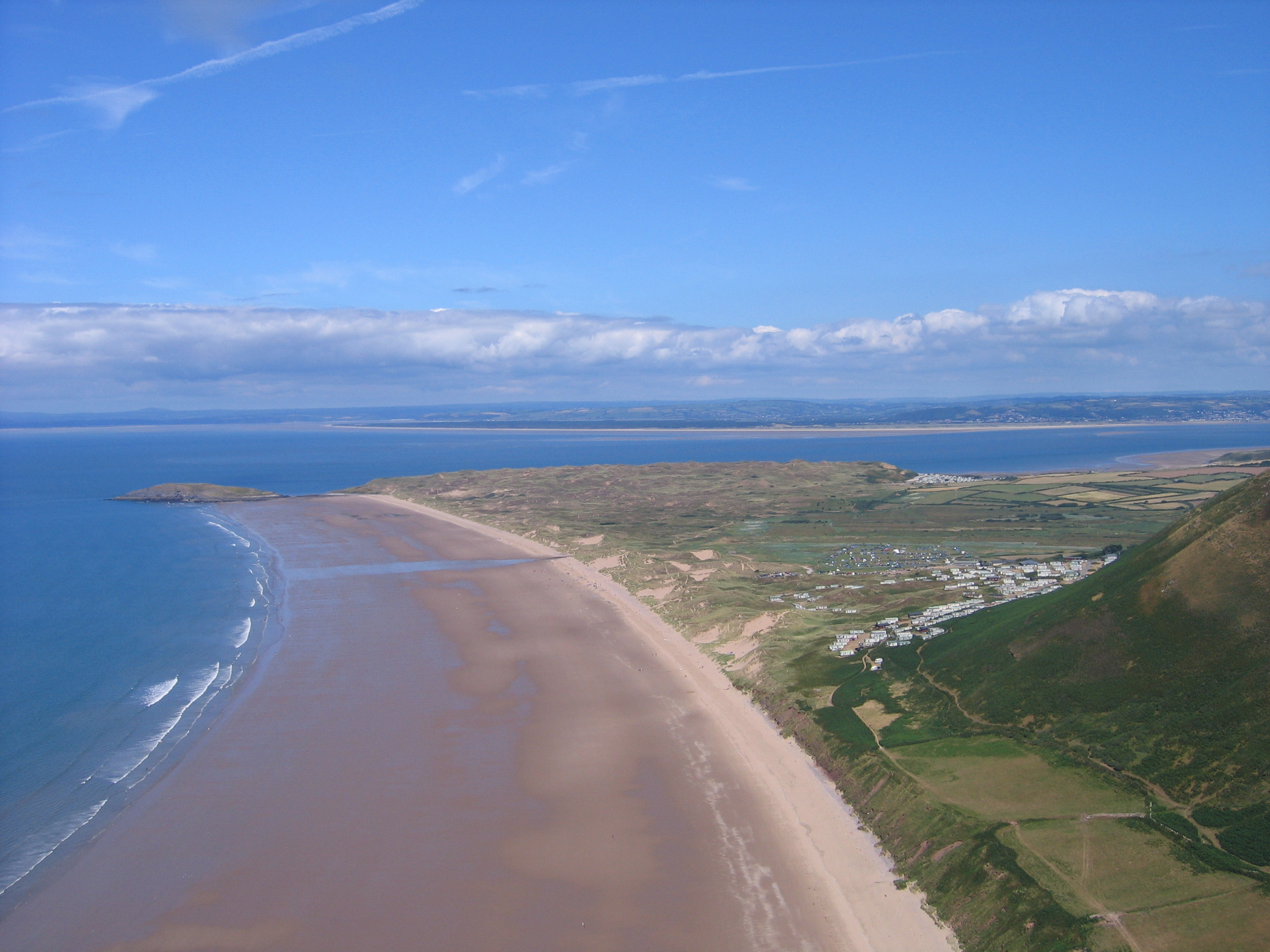
A view west along Rhosilli Bay, Burry Holms is at the top left of the beach

9,000 years ago, the sea was up to 12 miles (19 km) away. Inhabited by nomadic Mesolithic hunters, flint tools provide the first evidence of their existence. Charcoal-charred hazelnut tools made out of wood and bone were found in 1919. A 1998 excavation by the National Museums and Galleries of Wales found that Burry Holms was used as a Mesolithic seasonal camp. Iron Age people subsequently built a 5-acre (20,000 m^{2}) hillfort and ditch on the island, while in Medieval times it was home to a monastery. The island is popular among collectors of shells.

== See also ==
- List of hillforts in Wales
