= Llanrhidian Higher =

Coordinates: 51.63°N 4.11°W

- St Gwynour's Church, Penclawdd

- Location within Swansea
- Population: 5,218 (2011 census)
- Community: Llanrhidian Higher
- Principal area: Swansea
- Country: Wales
- Sovereign state: United Kingdom
- List of places UK Wales Swansea Map of the community

Llanrhidian Higher is a community in Swansea, Wales. The community has its own elected community council.

The area covered by the community council includes the villages of Penclawdd, Crofty, Llanmorlais, Blue Anchor and Wernffrwd. The population of the community taken at the 2011 census was 5218.

Following The Swansea (Communities) Order 2011, the southeast third of Llanrhidian Higher became a separate community of Three Crosses.

== See also ==
- Llanrhidian Lower
