= Wernffrwd =

Coordinates: 51.625°N 4.146°W

- Location within Swansea
- OS grid reference: SS515940
- Community: Llanrhidian Higher
- Principal area: Swansea
- Preserved county: West Glamorgan
- Country: Wales
- Sovereign state: United Kingdom
- Post town: Swansea
- Postcode district: SA4
- Dialling code: 01792
- Police: South Wales
- Fire: Mid and West Wales
- Ambulance: Welsh
- UK Parliament: Gower
- Senedd Cymru – Welsh Parliament: Gower

Wernffrwd (Gwernffrwd) is a village in the south of Wales. It is located approximately 8.5 miles (13.7 km) from Swansea, and is within the Community of Llanrhidian Higher.

The village is situated in the north of the Gower Peninsula, overlooking the Loughor Estuary and consists of lower and upper Wernffrwd. The majority of the houses can be found in the lower part of the village. The village is home to the church of Saint David's, which first opened in 1898.

The area has been known for its coal mines, with the earliest known mining dating back to 1665. In 1795 an accident at a Wernffrwd mine lead to the death of four miners.
