= Llanrhidian Lower =

Coordinates: 51°36′23″N 4°10′13″W

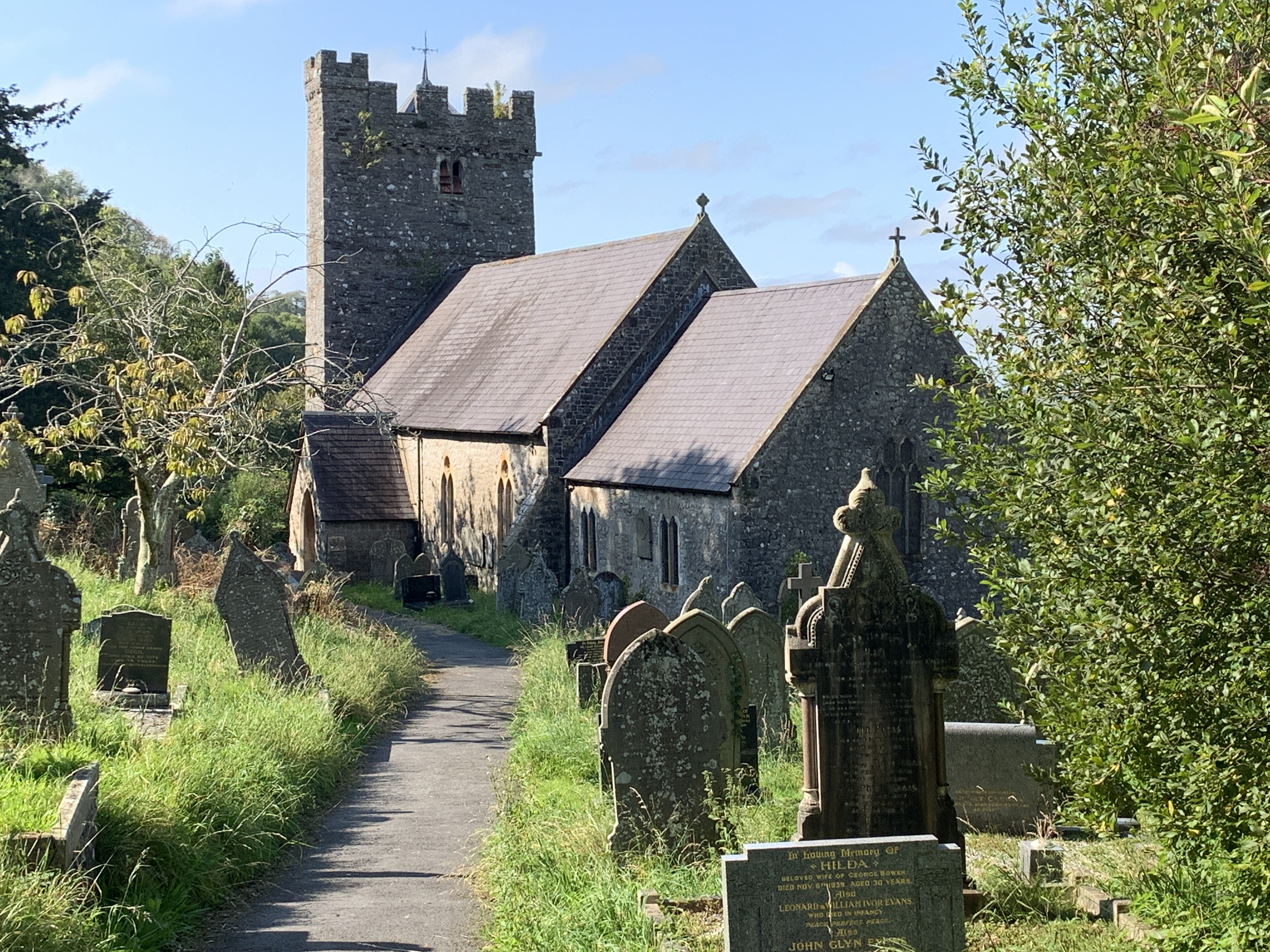
- St Rhidian and St Illtyd's Church, Llanrhidian

- Location within Swansea
- Population: 512 (2011 census)
- Community: Llanrhidian Lower
- Principal area: Swansea
- Country: Wales
- Sovereign state: United Kingdom
- List of places UK Wales Swansea Map of the community

Llanrhidian Lower is a community in the Gower peninsula forming the west of Swansea, south Wales. The community has its own elected community council. The population was 512 as of the 2011 UK census.

The area covered by the community council includes Llanrhidian village and less populous Cilibion to the east, Oldwalls, Leason, Llethryd and The Common. The main village sits well above steep coastal banks on a rolling plain below two promontories, Arthur's Stone, Gower on the peninsula's main escarpment Cefn Bryn, specifically being its western burial mound sometimes called Burnt Mound (154 metres Above Ordnance Datum); and a closer example, a small freestanding tor equally close to the coast, Cilifor Top at 118 metres.

The coast here consists of broad and long Llanrhidian Marsh followed by similar-size (tidal) Llanrhidian Sands and then the relatively thinly watered Loughor Estuary at low tide; Llanelli, Pwll and Burry Port (Porth Tywyn) face the other side of the estuary and lack such a marsh habitat though have more mudflats in places.

Llanrhidian Lower has a community council of six councillors, who meet monthly at Llanrhidian Community Hall.

== See also ==
- Llanrhidian Higher

== Sources ==
- Gower Community Councils: Map of the Community Councils on Gower
