= Roch Castle =

Medieval castle in Pembrokeshire, Wales

Coordinates: 51.849112°N 5.078897°W

- Roch, Haverfordwest, Wales

Site information
- Owner: Griffiths-Roch Foundation

Location
- Height: Up to 30 metres (98 ft)

Site history
- Built: c. 1200
- Built by: Adam de Rupe
- In use: Private
- Events: English Civil War

Listed Building – Grade I
- Reference no.: 11982

Roch Castle (Welsh: Castell y Garn) is a 13th-century castle, located at Roch near Haverfordwest, Wales.

Built by Norman knight Adam de Rupe circa 1200, probably on the site of an earlier wooden structure. Roche is the usual French word for rock, while rupestre signifies a plant growing among rocks.

Built at the same time as Pill Priory near Milford Haven, Roch Castle was probably built in this location as one of the outer defences of "Little England" or "Landsker", as it is located near the unmarked border which for centuries has separated the English and Welsh areas of Pembrokeshire.

After the deRupe family died out in the 15th century, the Castle was taken over eventually in the 17th century by the Walter family. Their daughter Lucy was born in the castle, and later became a courtesan of Charles II, and bore him an acknowledged son James, 1st Duke of Monmouth.

During the English Civil War, the Walter family declared for King Charles I. Although Pembrokeshire was initially Royalist, the Puritans gained the upper hand. The castle changed hands twice, before the Walter family fled when it was captured for a second time by the Parliamentary forces and subsequently burned in 1644. It lay dormant and unclaimed until the return of Duke of Monmouth, who led a rebellion and was captured at the Battle of Sedgemoor, and then beheaded on 15 July 1685.

The castle remained decaying until 1900, when purchased by John Philipps, 1st Viscount St Davids, who restored it with a steel frame and new concrete floors to the designs of D. E. Thomas of Haverfordwest. Further works were carried out in 1910 and circa 1918–20, the latter by D. F. Ingleton.

The castle was purchased in 2008 by Keith Griffiths and was restored as a hotel. Completed in 2013, the restoration was designed by Griffiths and Acanthus Holden. The hotel has won a number of awards.
