= Mynydd-bach =

Mynydd-bach, also spelled Mynydd-Bach, Mynydd Bach, Mynyddbach and Mynydd-bâch, a Welsh word meaning a 'little mountain', may refer to the following places in Wales:

- Mynydd-Bach, Swansea, also spelled Mynydd-bach, Mynyddbach, Mynydd Bach, district of Swansea
  - Mynyddbach Chapel, chapel in Swansea
  - Mynydd-bach (electoral ward), formerly Mynyddbach, electoral ward in Swansea
- Mynydd Bach (hills), hills in Ceredigion
- Mynydd Bach, Ceredigion, hamlet in Ceredigion
- Mynydd-bach, Monmouthshire, also spelled Mynyddbach, Mynydd-bâch or Mynydd Bach, hamlet in Monmouthshire
- Mynydd Bach Trecastell, hill in Carmarthenshire and Powys
