= Gellionnen Chapel =

Unitarian church in Wales, United Kingdom

Coordinates: 51.7210°N 3.8824°W

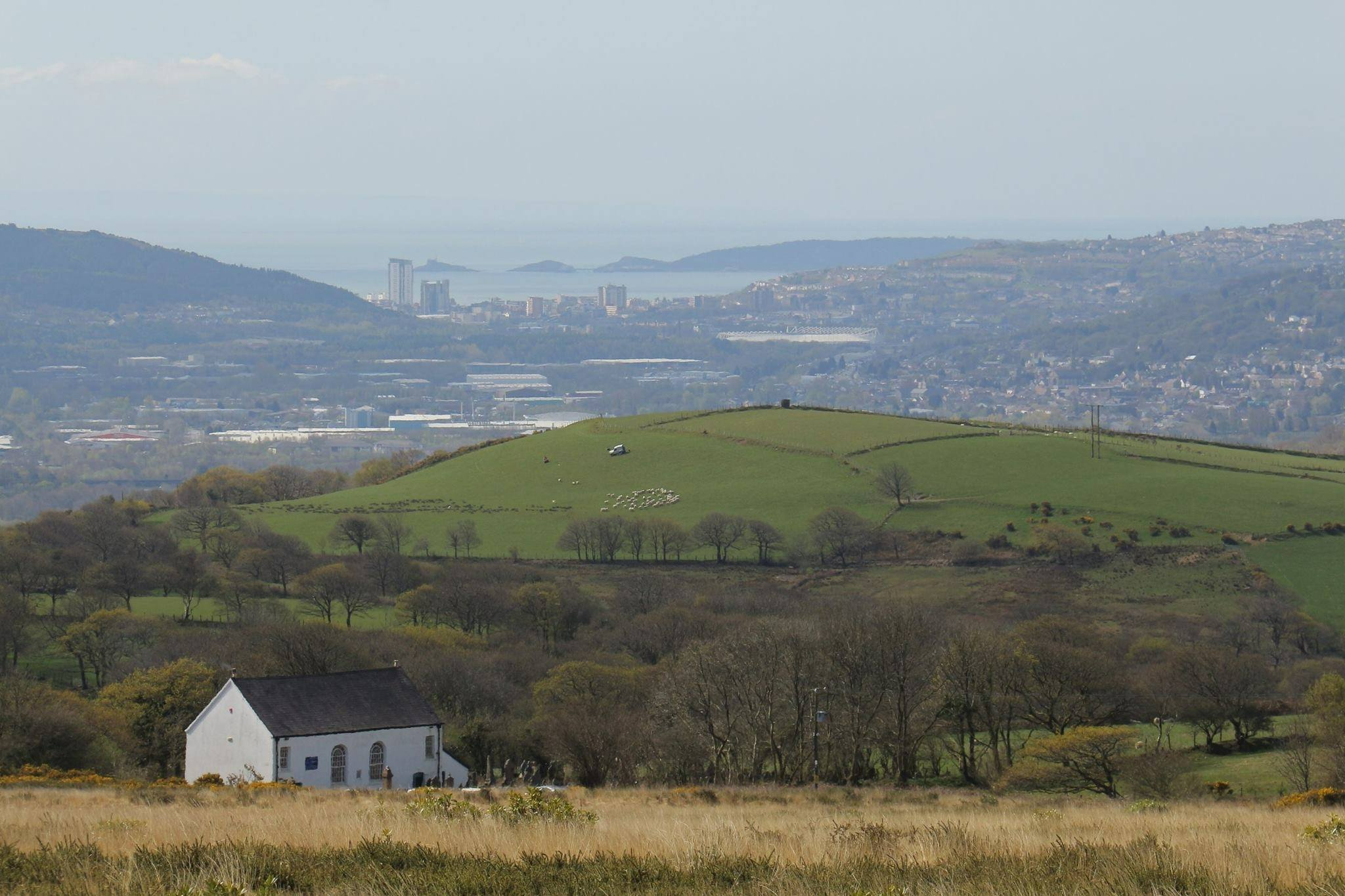
Gellionnen Chapel, looking down over Swansea Bay

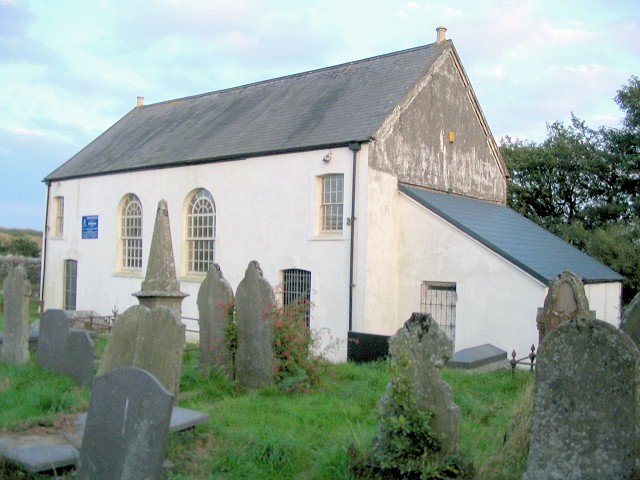
Gellionnen Chapel

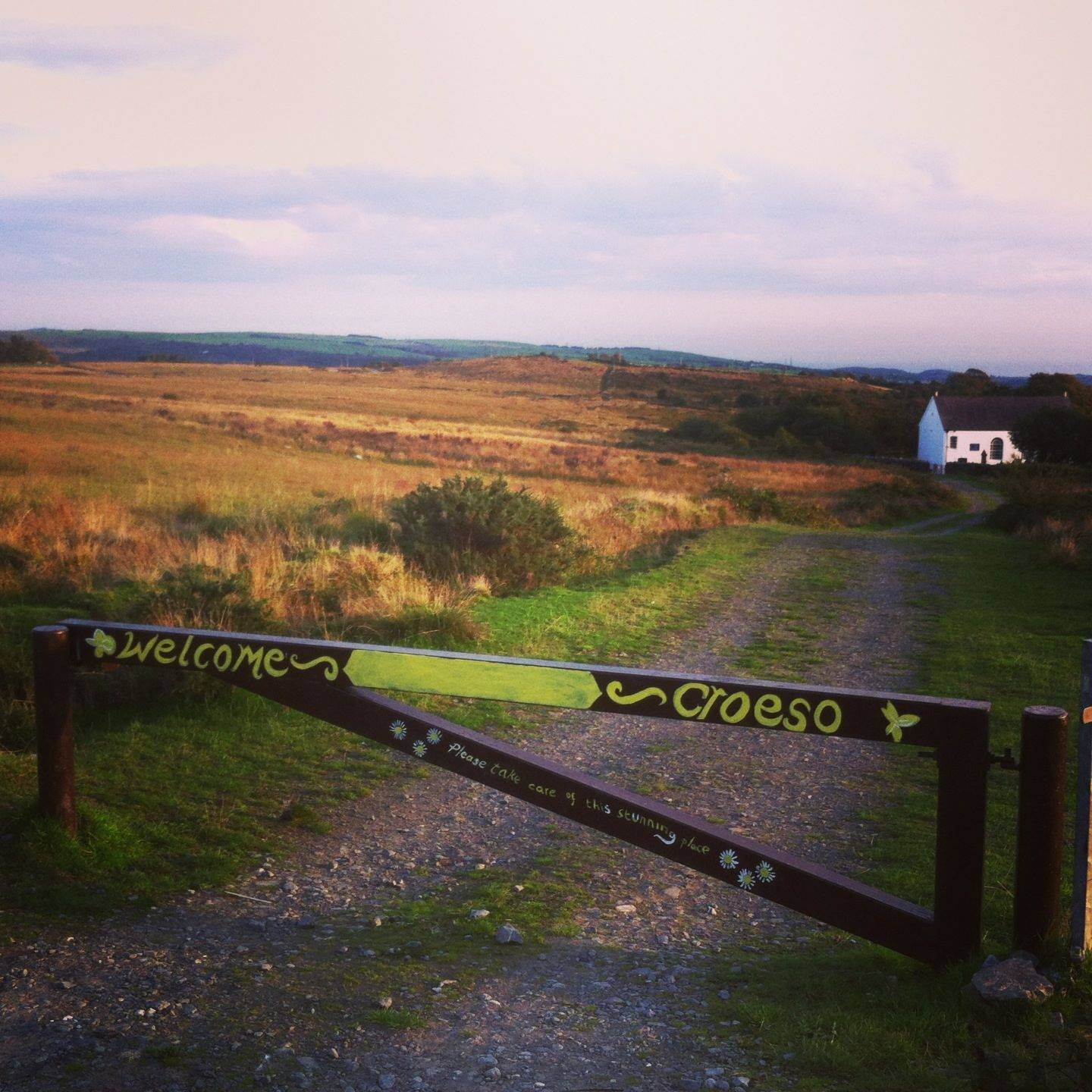
View of Gellionnen Chapel from the road

Gellionnen Chapel is a Unitarian place of worship near Pontardawe, South Wales, United Kingdom. The chapel was first built in 1692 by Protestant dissenters, becoming Unitarian in the late 18th century. It is a member of the General Assembly of Unitarian and Free Christian Churches, the umbrella body for British Unitarians. Gellionnen Chapel is the oldest Dissenting chapel in the Swansea Valley, is one of the oldest surviving chapels in the region and is a Grade II* listed building.

== History ==
=== Pre-1692 ===
Near to the location of the present-day chapel stood a Celtic Church, Llan Eithrim, close to an ancient well of religious significance, Fynnon Wen. Llan Eithrim was consecrated by the Saxon Bishop Herewald in 1060 AD. A Welsh priest named Gwidyr was in charge of the church. Llan Eithrim is believed to have been destroyed during the Reformation.

A stone tablet known as the Gellionnen Stone survived from the old Llan Eithrim church and was incorporated into the wall of Gellionnen Chapel. The Gellionnen Stone, dated c. 900 AD, was donated by the congregation to Swansea Museum in 1965.

In the 1650s, dissenting Protestant preachers visited the area, speaking at local farms. Among them apparently was Jenkin Jones, Catabaptist and Presbyterian Minister and veteran of Oliver Cromwell's parliamentarian army in the English Civil War. In 1662, Reverend Robert Thomas was ejected from Cadoxton Church and established a congregation at Gellionnen, meeting at first in local homes and farms.

=== 17th and 18th centuries ===
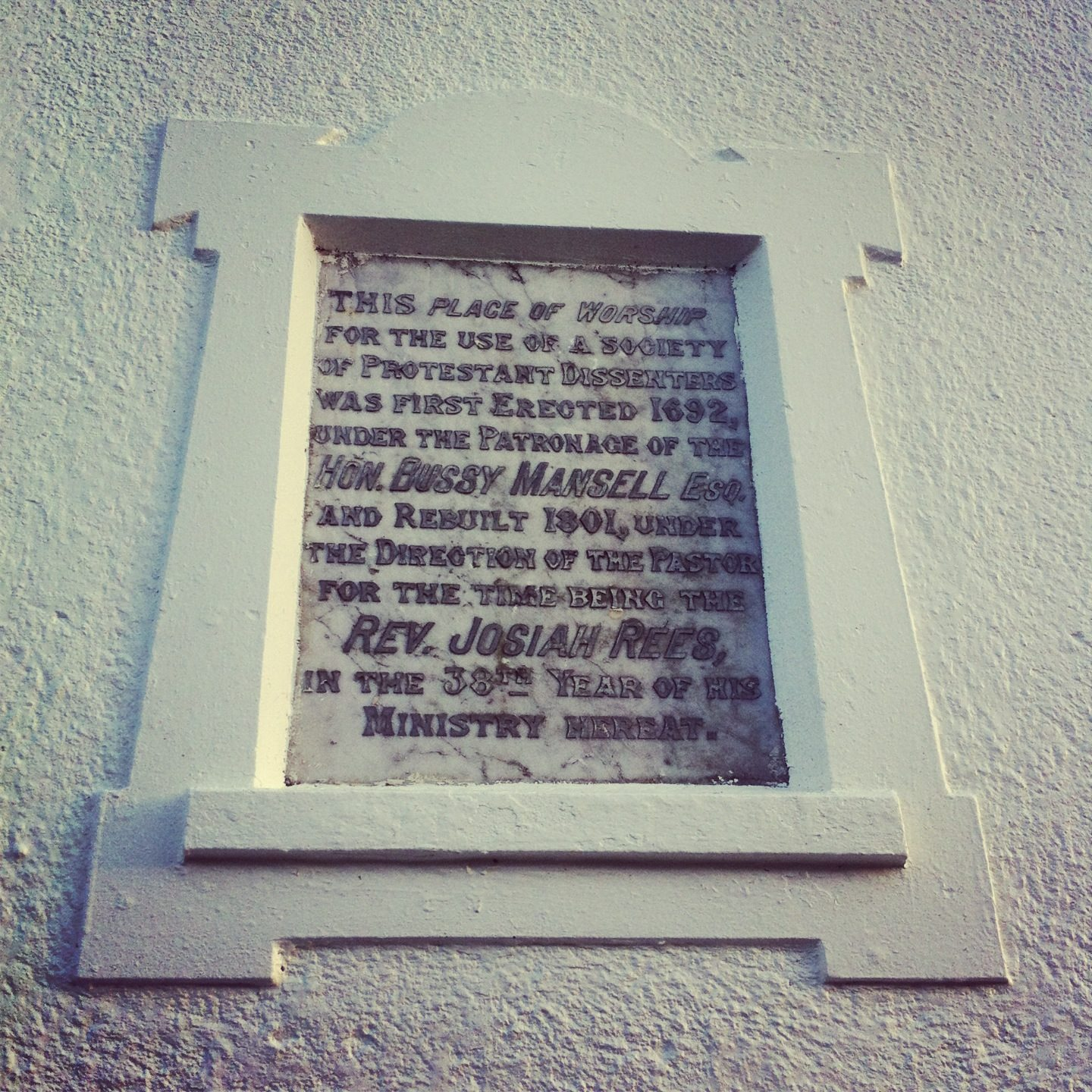
The plaque on the exterior wall of Gellionnen Chapel commemorating its founding in 1692

==== Early years ====
Gellionnen Chapel was first built in 1692 by Protestant dissenters on Mynydd Gellionnen (Gellionnen Mountain), who had apparently previously met in local houses and farms. The land was donated by Bussy Mansell, a landowner, Member of Parliament, and veteran of the English Civil War. Gellionnen was one of five Dissenting chapels established under the leadership of Reverend Robert Thomas after his expulsion from the Church of England. The other places of worship in this group included Maesyrhaf, Mynyddbach (Tyrdwncyn), Cwmllynfell, and Blaengwrach, the latter of which also later became Unitarian.

In the late 1690s and early 1700s, Reverend Lewis Davies, who came from Llanedi in Carmarthenshire, is thought to have established a Sunday School at Gellionnen Chapel, which existed for around forty years. His co-minister from 1701, Llewellyn Bevan, was a moderate Calvinist, considered evangelical in his views and democratic in his views. The minister from 1712 to 1742 was Roger Howell, a blacksmith renowned for his knowledge of the scriptures. Howell led the congregation towards Arminianism, preparing the way for the future of development of the chapel towards Unitarianism. In 1715, Gellionnen and its sister chapel, Gwynfe Chapel (10 miles north), had a congregation of around 550. Howell's successor as minister, Joseph Simmonds, ran a school in Llansamlet, Swansea, where the radical preacher, philosopher and mathematician Richard Price was educated.

In the 1740s and 1750s, Arminianism and Unitarianism began to develop among the Gellionnen congregation.

==== Josiah Rees and Iolo Morganwg ====
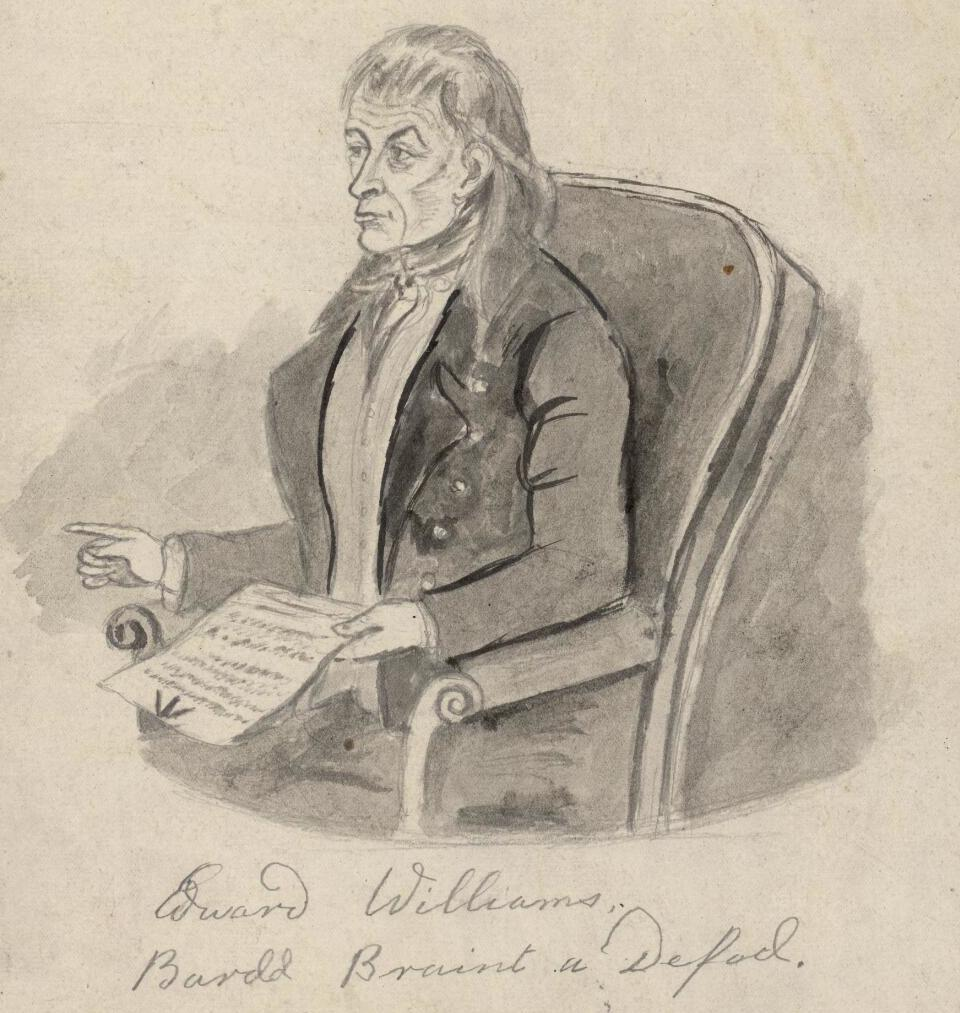
Iolo Morganwg, who had close connections to Gellionnen Chapel

In 1764, Reverend Josiah Rees became minister at Gellionnen Chapel and oversaw its transition towards Unitarianism and the re-building of the chapel in 1801–02. Josiah was the son of Reverend Owen Rees of Hen dy Cwrdd Trecynon (The Old Meeting House, Trecynon) in Aberdare. Josiah was a progressive thinker and studied under Solomon Harries in Swansea and Samuel Thomas, a liberal tutor at Carmarthen.

Around 1785, Josiah Rees opened a school, having declined the position of principal of the Presbyterian College, Swansea. Rees was the editor of the second-ever Welsh language magazine, Trysorfa Gwybodaeth or Yr Eurgrawn (1776), and was a respected scholar, writing many booklets on his faith. He worked with Iolo Morganwg and Tomos Glyn Cothi (Thomas Evans), Rees studied, collected and copied rare Welsh manuscripts, building an impressive library at his home at Gelligron. Under Rees' influence, Gellionnen's congregation became 'Arminian, Arian and Semi-Unitarian'. In 1802, the Welsh Unitarian Society was founded during a meeting at Gellionnen Chapel, attended by Iolo Morganwg. That year, the chapel was opened after being re-built. Josiah Rees travelled to London to raise funds for the chapel and died shortly after returning from one such trip in 1804. In one of his final letters, Rees praised the congregation for fundraising and claimed (perhaps with exaggeration) that 700 people had attended a recent service.

As a result of Gellionnen's move towards Unitarianism, a schism took place and a section of the congregation left. Those who left went on to build Baran Chapel in 1805 a few miles away. Nevertheless, Gellionnen attracted worshippers from as far away as Swansea, Neath, Cwmllynfell and Bettws.

Josiah Rees was succeeded by his son, Dr Thomas Rees (1805–06). Thomas Rees wrote a history of Unitarianism and translated the Racovian Catechism and was an important Unitarian minister in London. His brother, Owen Rees, was a co-founder of Longman's publishing firm.

Reverend Thomas Morgan (1737–1813) of Blaengwrach, who lived with the Rees family and is buried in their family plot at Gellionnen Chapel, is believed to have pioneered the use of a cowpox vaccine to combat smallpox on hundreds of local children, before the work of the famous Edward Jenner. Inside the chapel is a memorial to Thomas Morgan, reputedly carved by Iolo Morganwg.

=== 19th century ===
After Thomas Rees' departure David Oliver, a General Baptist from Aberdare, minister from 1806 to 1814. His ministry was relatively conservative and there was unrest among the congregation. During this period, Independents led by the minister from Mynyddbach Chapel, attempted to seize control of Gellionnen. The power struggle between the Independents and the Arminian/Unitarians was settled "after a battle of words and fists" outside the chapel, with the Arminian/Unitarian faction victorious.

It was only during the ministry of Reverend John James (1815–1864) that Gellionnen became fully Unitarian. Reverend James came to Gellionnen from Cardiganshire at the urging of Iolo Morganwg, who was keen for Gellionnen to be strengthened as a centre of Unitarianism and liberal religion. In his long ministry of Gellionnen Chapel, the scholarly Reverend James ran a famous secondary boarding school at his home at Vardre, Clydach. He also translated into Welsh Joseph Priestley's A Catechism for Children and Young People in 1805 and Thomas Belsham's A Calm Inquiry. Reverend James was close to Iolo Morganwg and the two corresponded on a range of topics. According to tradition, because of his knowledge of ancient Greek Reverend James was once called to Llangrannog to speak to shipwrecked Greek sailors.

In 1873, the chapel was completely overhauled and renovated during the ministry of Reverend John Evans. The stone roof tiles came from Bettws church, while the floor was replaced and the old stone slabs moved outside. At the same time, the land on which the chapel was built was purchased by the congregation. Like his predecessor Reverend John James, Reverend Evans ran a school at his home at Trebanos House, Trebanos. John Evans was succeeded by W. J. Davies (1887–1889), an author and chemist, who formed an orchestra and choir at the chapel. Davies left Gellionnen for Llandysul, where he published Hanes Plwyf Llandysul (1894) - the first book published by Cambrian Press. Davies was in turn succeeded by J. Fisher Jones (1889–1892). Under the latter, in 1894, Gellionnen's sister chapel – the Graig Chapel – was opened in nearby Trebanos. In 1895, a thousand people gathered on the mountain for a summer festival to raise funds, with performances from the chapel's brass band.

=== 20th century ===
In the 20th century, Gellionnen Chapel was a lively centre of religious, social and cultural life. The minister from 1895 until 1905 was T. J. Jenkins, a popular preacher, who was followed by Alfa Richards (1906–1910). Reverend Richards was a poet and preacher who drew crowds into the chapels and wrote beautiful hymns. Many young men from the congregation served and were killed during the First World War. The minister during that time was D. G. Rees, who served from 1912 to 1930. Rees wrote letters to the men at the front, organised soup kitchens and organised fundraising activities. He visited Palestine and gave lectures on the subject when he returned.

The Graig Chapel was renowned for having one of the area's finest organs installed. D. Elwyn Davies wrote:

"In 1925, on the eve of the 'Big Strike', these restless people could genuinely boast that they had installed in the Graig the 'Valley's best pipe-organ' and although it had the price-tag of £1,179 it was soon paid; the music of oratorios and recitals, with ordinary folk contributing according to their means, ranging from the fortune of £27 to the sacrifice of a shilling and sixpence, a woman's wage at the steel furnace in Pontardawe."

During the Great Depression, local unemployed men volunteered their time to clean and decorate Gellionnen and Graig chapels, between 1921 and 1926. In the interwar years, Gellionnen and Graig chapels had an 'orchestra and choir, operatic and dramatic groups, concerts and penny-reading lectures and social functions of all kinds'. During the Second World War, the minister was Reverend J. D. Jones (1932–1948), who went on to become Principal of the college at Carmarthen.

In the early 1950s, R. I. Pritchard was Gellionnen's minister and he published a book of hymns, Salmau'r Mynydd, which were written and composed by the congregation. Reverend Pritchard had a North Walian Methodist background and invigorated the chapel's radical conscience and youth movement. In the postwar period, Reverend Pritchard arranged exchange visits between young people from the congregation and young Germans.

Reverend D. Elwyn Davies was minister from 1957 until 1988/89 and was renowned as a hymn writer. Reverend Davies was the editor of the Welsh Unitarian newspaper, Yr Ymofynnydd, and became Greek and New Testament Professor at Memorial College, Swansea and Aberystwyth. During his ministry, Gellionnen was repaired and decorated twice and the Gellionnen Stone transferred to Swansea Museum.

== The chapel today ==
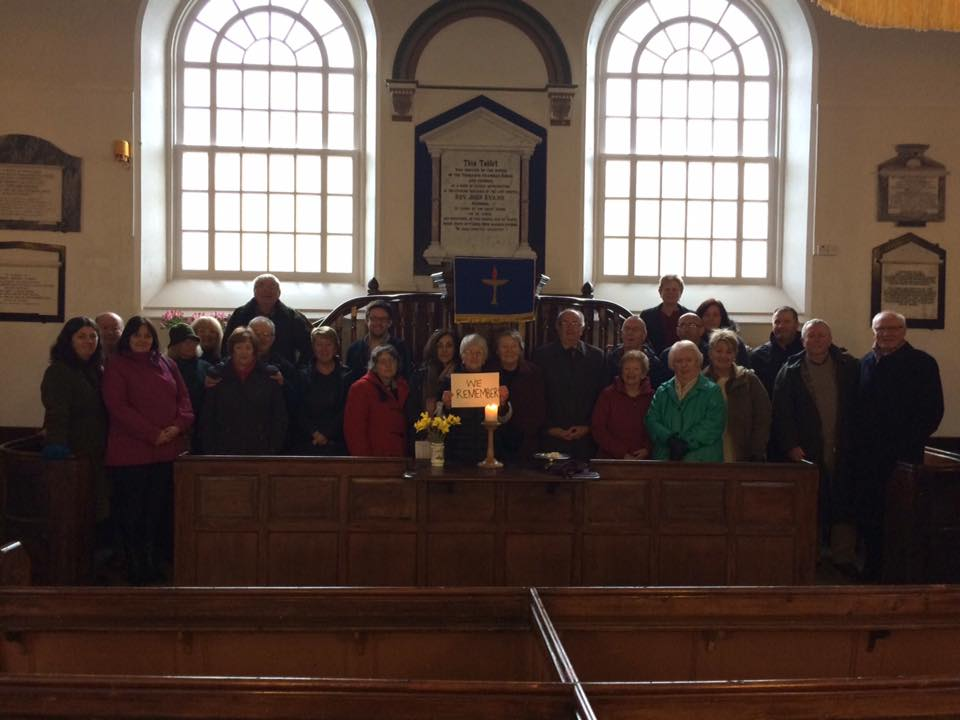
The congregation of Gellionnen Chapel marking Holocaust Memorial Day in January 2017

Today, Gellionnen Chapel holds weekly services every Sunday. The chapel is part of the Unitarian movement, which:

"is an open-minded and welcoming approach to faith that encourages individual freedom, equality for all and rational thought. There is no list of things that Unitarians must believe: instead we think everyone has the right to reach their own conclusions."

According to the chapel's website:

"We aspire to create a loving, caring religious community within which we: Value people in their diversity and uniqueness, Encourage freedom of thought and speech, Support spiritual exploration, Create celebratory worship, Advocate justice, liberty, honesty, integrity, peace and love. Hence we strive to: Make the best of the life we have, Be democratic in our practice, Celebrate life in its many forms, Respect people whose beliefs and attitudes are different from our own."

The chapel attracts large audiences for its annual Summer Folk Festival, the Plygain service on Christmas Eve, and the Mari Llwyd service in the New Year.

In 2008, the chapel was broken into and badly vandalised by youths. The chapel was fully restored after fundraising efforts.

The chapel made headlines in 2016 for holding the first religious same-sex marriage ceremony in the area.

== Roll of Ministers ==
The ministers of Gellionnen Chapel have included:

- Robert Thomas (1692)
- Lewis Davies (1692–1712)
- Llewellyn Bevan (c. 1700–1724)
- Roger Howell (1712–1742)
- Joseph Simmonds (1724–1758)
- Josiah Rees (1764–1804)
- Thomas Rees (1805–06)
- David Oliver (1806–1814)
- John James (1815–1864)
- John Evans (1862–1885)
- W. J. Davies (1887–1889)
- J. Fisher Jones (1889–1892)
- T. J. Jenkins (1895–1905)
- Alfa Richards (1906–1910)
- D. J. Rees (1912–1930)
- J. D. Jones (1932–1948)
- R. I. Pritchard (1949–1953)
- D. Elwyn Davies (1957–1988/89)
- Eirion Phillips (1985?–2005)
