= Treboeth =

Coordinates: 51.653°N 3.940°W

Treboeth: Welsh: Tre-boeth
- Village
- Location within Swansea
- Population: 2,000−3,000
- OS grid reference: SS652967
- Principal area: Swansea
- Preserved county: West Glamorgan
- Country: Wales
- Sovereign state: United Kingdom
- Post town: SWANSEA
- Postcode district: SA5
- Dialling code: 01792
- Police: South Wales
- Fire: Mid and West Wales
- Ambulance: Welsh
- UK Parliament: Swansea West
- Senedd Cymru – Welsh Parliament: Swansea East

Treboeth is a suburb and historical village in the Mynydd-Bach and Penderry wards of Swansea, Wales.

Gwyrosydd Primary School and Welsh language primary school Ysgol Gynradd Gymraeg Tirdeunaw are in Treboeth. Gwyrosydd was the bardic name of Treboeth-born Daniel James, author of the Welsh language hymn Calon Lân, which is often sung in rugby matches, Welsh religious ceremonies and other events.

The village is home to several places of worship including Caersalem Chapel, St Albans, Treboeth Gospel Hall and Mynyddbach Chapel, as well as the listed Cwmgelli Cemetery.

== Naming and origins ==
In 1556 parcels of land were titled Dree Boeth, and by 1799 a map of Swansea titled the area Treboth.

The most common theory for the origin of Treboeth is that it derives from the common place-name element tref (English: town) and a second element, a mutated form of the adjective poeth (English: hot), giving a name meaning something liek "the burnt home-stead", possibly in reference to the large-scale burning that was involved in the clearing of the land for settlement.

A second possible etymology is that Treboeth is a corruption of Tri-bwthyn (English: three cottages), a possible reference to the original ancient cottages along Llangyfelach Road.

== Politics ==
The area sits within the Westminster Parliamentary area of Swansea West after boundary changes in 2024, and within the Senedd constituency of Swansea East.

The local councillors for the area are Mike Lewis, Jess Pritchard and Sam Pritchard in the Myndd-bach Electoral Ward, and Mair Baker, Terry Hennegan and Erika Kirchner in the Penderry Electoral Ward

Portrait	Name	Party	Seat
	Torsten Bell	Labour	MP for Swansea West (UK Parliament constituency)
	Mike Hedges	Labour and Co-operative	MS for Swansea East (Senedd constituency)
	Tom Giffard	Conservative	Regional MS for Swansea West (Senedd constituency)
	Altaf Hussain	Conservative	Regional MS for Swansea West (Senedd constituency)
	Sioned Williams	Plaid Cymru	Regional MS for Swansea West (Senedd constituency)
	Luke Fletcher	Plaid Cymru	Regional MS for Swansea West (Senedd constituency)

== Education ==
There is one primary education school within Treboeth, Gwyrosydd Primary. The school is named after Daniel James who was known by his bardic name Gwyrosydd.

In 2012, the local community school, Daniel James Community School, closed after a damning report of the school's management and function which resulted in the resignation of the headmaster and deputy headmaster, and the school being placed under special improvement measures. As there was no improvement, it closed its doors to all pupils and existing pupils were transferred to other local secondary education schools within Swansea, many having to travel as far as three miles to Bishop Gore School in Sketty.

In 2025 Swansea Council announced that Bishop Vaughn Catholic School will be relocated to the former site of Daniel James Community School with demolition expected to start as early as 2025-26 and construction starting by 2027.

There are a number of schools in the neighbouring areas of Treboeth which educate in the mediums of English and Welsh.

== Landmarks ==
The village is home to a number of local landmarks.

- Mynyddbach Chapel
- Treboeth Gospel Hall
- St Albans
- Caersalem Chapel
- Allt-y-Screch House
- The Kings Head
- The Eagle Inn
- The Morning Star Cottage (Y Bwthyn Seren Fore), a 15th-century cottage
- Cwmgelli Cemetery

== Notable people ==
- Catherine Zeta-Jones, actress
- Daniel James, writer of popular Welsh hymn ‘Calon Lan’
- Joanna Page, actress best known as Stacey in Gavin & Stacey
- Dewi ‘Pws’ Morris, Welsh musician, poet, actor and comedian
- Hannah Stone, harpist
- Dame Jean Thomas, biochemist
- Ceri Rhys Matthews, folk musician and record producer
- Cynog Dafis, former member of Parliament
- Andrew Morris, gymnast
- Betty Grey, table tennis player
- Harry Payne, rugby player
