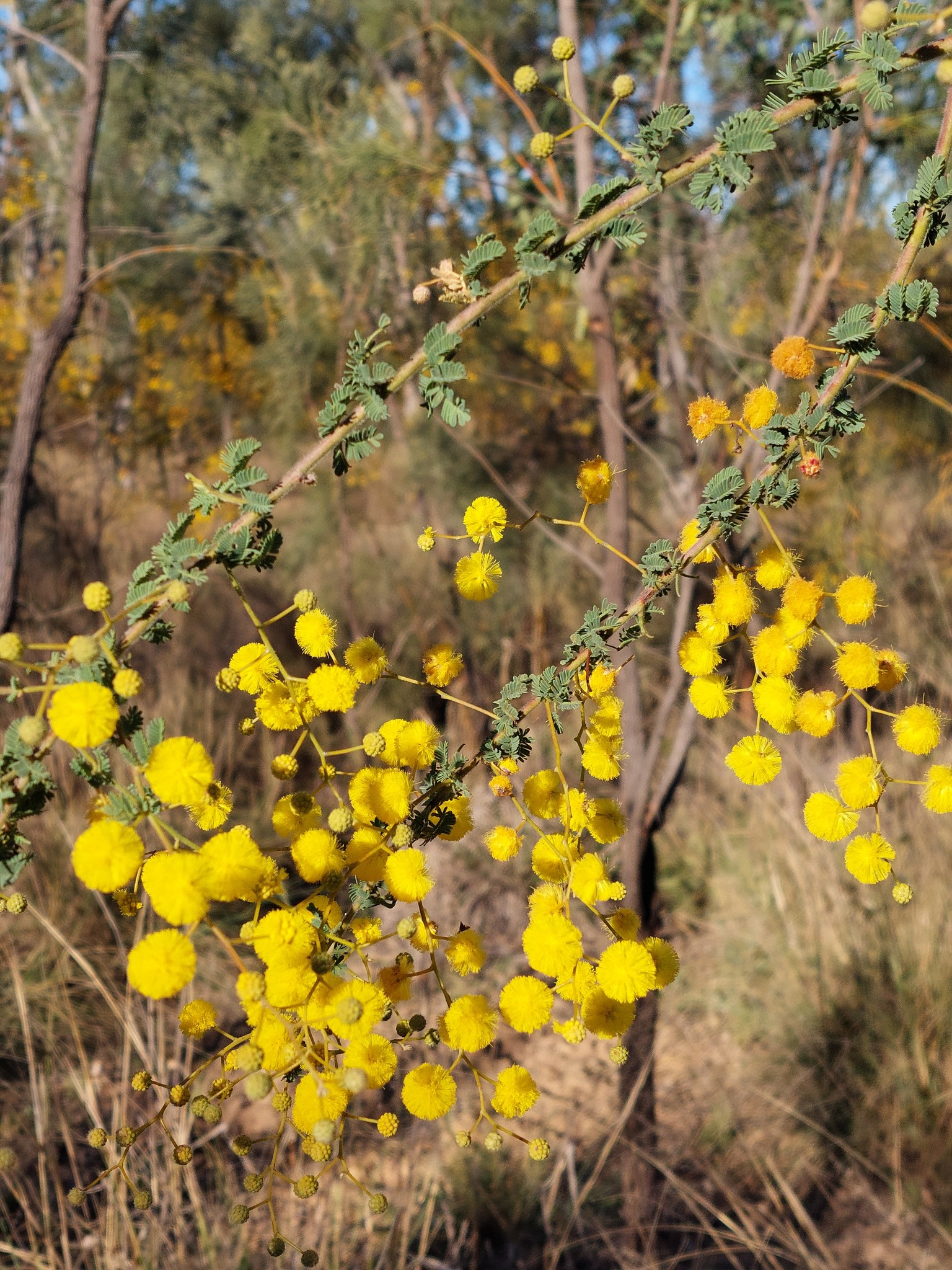
- Near Coolatai

Scientific classification
- Kingdom: Plantae
- Clade: Embryophytes
- Clade: Tracheophytes
- Clade: Spermatophytes
- Clade: Angiosperms
- Clade: Eudicots
- Clade: Rosids
- Order: Fabales
- Family: Fabaceae
- Subfamily: Caesalpinioideae
- Clade: Mimosoid clade
- Genus: Acacia
- Species: A. leptoclada

Binomial name
- Acacia leptoclada A.Cunn. ex Benth.
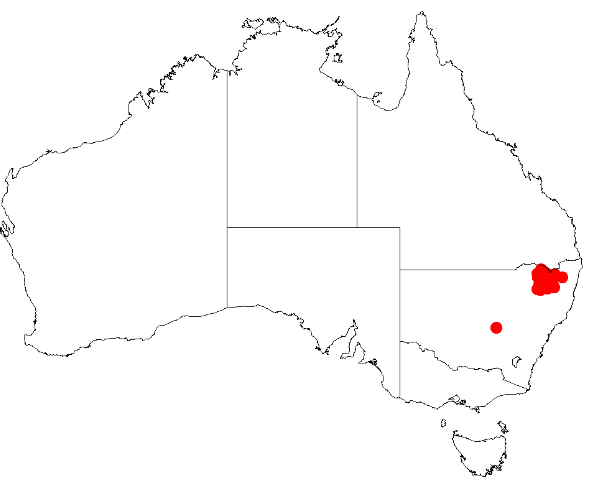
- Occurrence data from AVH

Synonyms
- Acacia polystachya A.Cunn. ex Benth. p.p.; Racosperma leptocarpum (Benth.) Pedley

= Acacia leptoclada =

Sharp feather wattle

Species of legume

Acacia leptoclada, commonly known as sharp feather wattle, is a species of flowering plant in the family Fabaceae and is endemic to northern New South Wales, Australia. It is a spreading shrub with pendulous branches, more or less terete branchlets, bipinnate leaves with up to five pairs of pinnae, each with 5 to 13 pairs of pinnules, spherical heads of dark golden or dark yellow flowers and hairy, leathery pods.

== Description ==
Acacia leptoclada is a spreading shrub that typically grows to a height of 1–3 m (3 ft 3 in – 9 ft 10 in) and has pendulous branches, smooth bark and terete branchlets sometimes covered with white or fawn hairs. The leaves are bipinnate with up to five pairs of pinnae on a rachis 4–12 mm (0.16–0.47 in) long, each with five to thirteen pairs of oblong to narrowly oblong pairs of pinnules 1.5–3 mm (0.059–0.118 in) long and 0.4–1 mm (0.016–0.039 in) wide. The flowers are borne in spherical heads usually in zig-zag racemes 10–60 mm (0.39–2.36 in) long in leaf axils, each head 7–12 mm (0.28–0.47 in) in diameter with 30 to 45 golden or dark yellow flowers. Flowering occurs from August to Nevember, and the pods are 15–95 mm (0.59–3.74 in) long, 5–9 mm (0.20–0.35 in) wide and leathery black or brown, sometimes densely covered with shaggy hairs.

== Taxonomy ==
Acacia leptoclada was first formally described in 1842 by George Bentham from an unpublished description by Allan Cunningham of specimens collected on the Liverpool Plains of New South Wales, in Hooker's London Journal of Botany. The specific epithet (leptoclada) means 'slender young shoot'.

== Distribution and habitat ==
This species of wattle grows in open forest and shrubland in sandy, granitic and serpentinite soils between Yetman, Warialda, Barraba and Guyra in the Northern Tablelands of New South Wales.
