= George Owen Rees =

Welsh-Italian physician

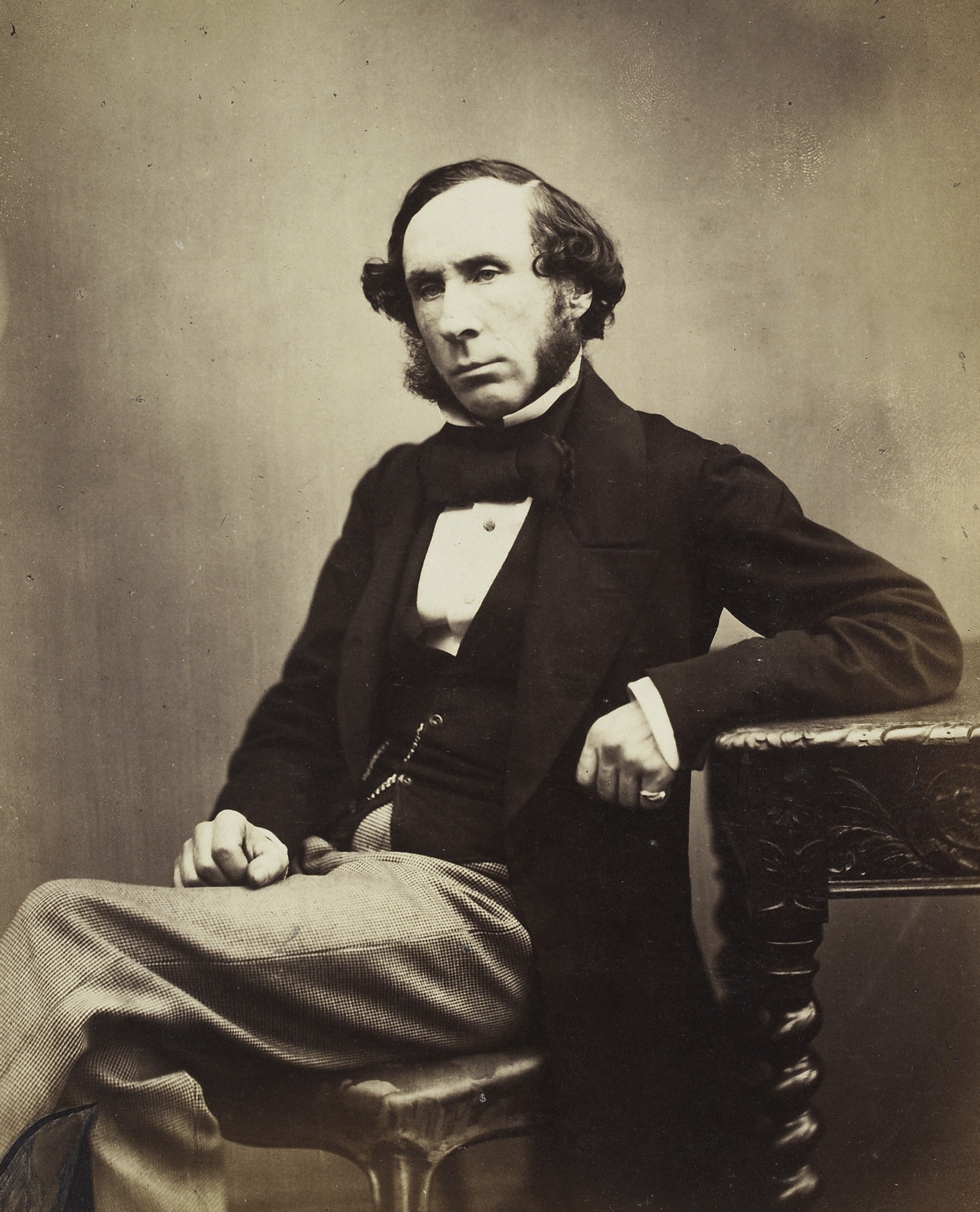
George Owen Rees

George Owen Rees (November 1813 – 27 May 1889) was a Welsh-Italian physician.

== Life ==
Born at Smyrna in November 1813, he was son of Josiah Rees, a Levantine merchant and British consul there. His mother was born in Newfoundland, Canada. Thomas Rees was his uncle, and Rev. Josiah Rees his grandfather. He was educated at a private school at Clapham, and acquired a knowledge of French, German, and Italian.

In 1829 Rees entered Guy's Hospital, as apprenticed to Richard Stocker the apothecary there. Later, in 1836, he studied at Paris. In the session of 1836–7 he was enrolled at Glasgow University as a student in the classes of botany (under William Dawson Hooker) and surgery (under John Burns). He graduated M.D. at Glasgow on 27 April 1836, and began to practice in London. He first resided in Guilford Street, Russell Square, subsequently in Cork Street, and finally at 26 Albemarle Street, Piccadilly.

Through the influence of Sir Benjamin Brodie, Rees secured the appointment as the first medical officer to Pentonville prison. In 1842 he was appointed physician to the Northern Dispensary, and in 1843 assistant physician to Guy's Hospital. He became full physician at Guy's in 1856, and after thirty years' service on the staff there he retired on 26 February 1873, and became consulting physician. He was elected a fellow of the Royal College of Physicians in 1844, and afterwards held in the college the offices of censor (1852–3), senior censor (1863–4), and councillor (1855–64–71). He was elected a Fellow of the Royal Society in 1843.

At Guy's Rees was for many years lecturer on the practice of medicine. He was Gulstonian lecturer at the Royal College of Physicians in 1845, when he lectured On the Blood: principally in regard to its Physical and Pathological Attributes; Croonian lecturer in 1856–8, when he chose for his subjects Calculous Disease and its Consequences and Frequent Micturition; and Harveian orator in 1869. He became the first Lettsomian lecturer at the Medical Society of London in 1850, and in 1851 he delivered a course on Some of the Pathological Conditions of the Urine.

In later life Rees was consulting physician to the Queen Charlotte Lying-in Hospital and physician-extraordinary to Queen Victoria. He was frequently associated with Alfred Swaine Taylor in criminal investigations—notably in the trial of William Palmer, the Rugeley poisoner, in 1856. His patients were usually sufferers from kidney disease or gout. He supported the treatment of acute rheumatism by lemon juice.

A paralytic stroke in 1886 disabled Rees, and he died of apoplexy at Mayfield, Watford, on 27 May 1889. He was buried in Abney Park cemetery.

== Works ==
At an early period in his career Rees attracted the attention of Richard Bright, and assisted Bright in the analysis of urinary calculi and of the secretions in diseases of the kidney. He made quantitative analyses of the albumen and urea in the urine, and proved the presence of the latter in the blood. His papers on this subject are in the Medical Gazette for 1833. In Guy's Hospital Reports he wrote on the analysis of the blood and urine; showed in 1838 how sugar could be obtained from diabetic blood, where its presence had previously been doubted, and gave accounts of an analysis of a milky ascites which he pronounced to be chyle, and of an analysis of the bones in mollities ossium.

In 1841 Rees made, with Samuel Lane, observations on blood cells, arguing that they were flattened capsules containing a coloured fluid, and indicating the changes which they underwent on the application of reagents, such as saline fluids and syrup. He subsequently made observations on the nucleus of the corpuscle in different animals, and showed the similarity of the white corpuscle to those of lymph and pus. On the advice of Peter Mark Roget he communicated two papers to the Royal Society—On the Chemical Analysis of the Contents of the Thoracic Duct in the Human Subject (1842), and in June 1847, On the Function of the Red Corpuscles of the Blood, and on the Process of Arterialisation.

Rees joined Alfred Swaine Taylor in editing Jonathan Pereira's large work on materia medica. His published works also include:

- On the Analysis of the Blood and Urine in Health and Disease, 1836; 2nd edit. 1845.
- Observations on the Diagnosis of Bright's Disease (Medical Gazette, 1845).
- On a Remarkable Case of Paraplegia (Medical Gazette, 1845).
- Articles on "Lymph", "Chyle", and "Milk", in Robert Bentley Todd and William Bowman's Cyclopædia of Anatomy and Physiology.

== See also ==
List of Welsh medical pioneers
