= John Hughes (1872–1914) =

Welsh composer (1872–1914)

Landore John Hughes (13 February 1872 – 16 June 1914) was a Welsh composer known for his tune Calon Lân, generally used with a poem of the same name by Daniel James (Gwyrosydd). Hughes composed it at the invitation of Gwyrosydd. He composed many other hymn tunes.

== Birth ==
Hughes was born in Penybryn, Pembrokeshire. The house in which he was born bears a plaque.

== Occupation ==
Hughes worked his entire secular career for Dyffryn Steel Works in Morriston, beginning as an office boy and ending as marketing manager. He travelled internationally with the company and in the process taught himself six languages besides his native Welsh.

== Composing ==
For Calon Lân, a poem by Daniel James (Gwyrosydd), Hughes composed and harmonized the tune at the explicit invitation of Gwyrosydd, and it is generally sung to Hughes' tune. Hughes composed many of his tunes for Gymanfu Ganu and other Welsh singing meetings.

== Personal life ==
Hughes and his wife Mary Ann Thomas Hughes had three daughters.

== Death ==
Hughes died of a brain hemorrhage at 3 Stockwell Villas, Treboeth, Swansea, in 1914. He was buried adjacent to his parents in the graveyard of Caersalem Newydd Welsh Baptist Chapel, where he had served as organist. Fellow workers from the Steel Works served as his pallbearers.
