= Mynydd-Bach, Swansea =

Mynydd-Bach
- Location within Swansea
- Population: 8,872
- OS grid reference: SS652973
- Principal area: Swansea
- Preserved county: West Glamorgan
- Country: Wales
- Sovereign state: United Kingdom
- Post town: SWANSEA
- Postcode district: SA5
- Postcode district: SA6
- Dialling code: 01792
- Police: South Wales
- Fire: Mid and West Wales
- Ambulance: Welsh
- UK Parliament: Swansea East
- Senedd Cymru – Welsh Parliament: Swansea East
- List of places UK Wales Swansea 51.65889°N 3.94951°W Map of the community

Mynydd-Bach or Mynydd-bach is a suburban district and community in the City and County of Swansea, Wales, It falls within the coterminous Mynydd-Bach ward. The name Mynydd-Bach ('little mountain') refers to a small plateau, centred about 2.5 miles (4 km) north of Swansea city centre. The most important local employer is the DVLA, which moved here in 1974. The population as of the 2011 UK census was 8,872.

== History ==
The name Mynydd-Bach ("little mountain") refers to a small plateau.

Morriston is about one mile or 2 km to the north-east. This estate and its surrounds are within the ecclesiastical parishes (Church in Wales and Methodist) of Morriston (or Clase) which were established in the late 18th century. Much of the earlier building in this area occurred after the start of large-scale coal mining, copper smelting and tin-plating. The estate is centred 2.5 miles (4 km) north of Swansea city centre; it is between 100 and 165 metres above sea level.

At the north-eastern edge are two tall crumbling stone walls, the remains of a large building for 40 miners/smelters, named Morris Castle, which was commissioned by the key industrialist in the area, Sir John Morris, in the late 18th century.

== Amenities ==
Bishop Vaughan Catholic Comprehensive School and Daniel James Community School are in Mynydd-Bach. South and south-east are further schools in residential Pen-Lan and Treboeth.

To the west is Mynydd Cadle ("Battle Mountain") Common, preserved as a recreational area, with meadow walks. Horses are kept on a smaller common beside an expanse of farmland to the north next to a school. To the south-east is a large park, Llewellyn Park.

== Park View Estate ==
Park View Estate, also known as the Simcox Estate, is an area of housing between Treboeth and Morriston, on the slopes of the plateau. It was built in the late 1960s to early 1970s.

== See also ==
Mynyddbach Chapel
