= Bishop Vaughan =

Bishop Vaughan may refer to:

- Richard Vaughan (bishop) (c.1550 – 1607) - Bishop of Bangor, Chester and London
- William Vaughan (bishop) (1814–1902) - Catholic bishop of Plymouth
- Edward Vaughan (bishop) (d.1522) - Bishop of St David's
- Peter St George Vaughan (b. 1930) - Suffragan Bishop of Ramsbury
- Herbert Vaughan (1832–1903) - Catholic cardinal and Archbishop of Westminster
- Benjamin Noel Young Vaughan (1917–2003) - Bishop of Swansea and Brecon

== See also ==
- Bishop Vaughan Catholic Comprehensive School
