= Cwmgelli Cemetery =

Cemetery in Swansea, Wales

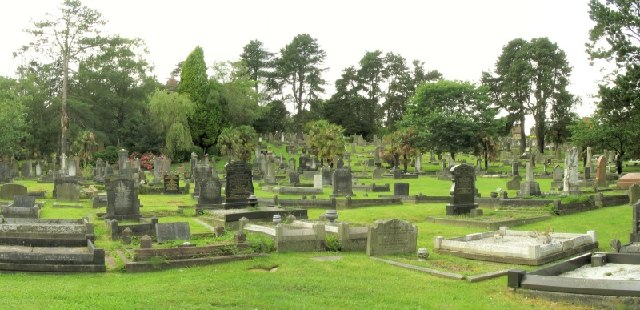
- Interactive map of Cwmgelli Cemetery

Details
- Established: 1895
- Location: Treboeth, Swansea
- Country: United Kingdom
- Coordinates: 51.6514°N 3.9433°W
- Type: Public
- Owned by: City and County of Swansea Council
- Size: 8 acres (3 ha)
- Find a Grave: Cwmgelli Cemetery

Cadw/ICOMOS Register of Parks and Gardens of Special Historic Interest in Wales
- Official name: Cwmgelli Cemetery
- Designated: 1 February 2022
- Reference no.: PGW(Gm)60(SWA)
- Listing: Grade II

Cwmgelli Cemetery, also known as Cwmgelly Cemetery, is a cemetery situated in the Treboeth area of Swansea, Wales. It is listed on the Cadw/ICOMOS Register of Parks and Gardens of Special Historic Interest in Wales, where it is designated Grade II for "its historic interest as a small Victorian garden cemetery".

== History ==
As early as October 1888, Swansea Corporation and the rural sanitation authority had identified Cwmgelli as the site for a public cemetery. The Corporation purchased a total of nineteen acres (8 ha) of land, but only eight acres (3 ha) were used to lay out the cemetery; the remainder was let for farming. The site was enclosed by stone walls and provided space for 6,950 burial plots. Cwmgelli Cemetery was formally opened by Alderman W. H. Edwards on 19 September 1895. The Swansea Journal and South Wales Liberal newspaper observed that the land sloped "rather suddenly" from west to east and described the internal roads as a "series of curves, which have the double effect of minimising the gradient, and at the same time dividing the ground in a number of shapely parterres".

=== Denominational issues ===
The cemetery was apportioned between Nonconformists, who shared three-quarters of the area equally with the Anglicans, and the Roman Catholics, who were allocated one-eighth. The remaining eighth was set aside for the planting of shrubbery along the pathways and a belt of trees inside the boundary wall.

In 1895, the Swansea Journal and South Wales Liberal observed that Cwmgelli was "the first public cemetery in Wales in which no portion is consecrated". It explained that Nonconformist members of the local council considered it unfair for burial fees to be directed into parish church coffers when the council itself was funding the laying out of the cemetery. Permission for the cemetery had been sought by the council Burial Board but was refused by the Home Office, which imposed the condition that part of the ground be consecrated. The council circumvented this requirement by making a second application as a sanitary authority and obtained authorisation from the Local Government Board under different legislation. The Western Mail had been critical of the Nonconformist councillors in 1892 for delaying the cemetery, declaring that "apparently, the dissatisfied section of Dissenters wish to shut the adherents of the Church of England out from carrying out their peculiar rites and ceremonies with respect to the portion [of the cemetery] allotted them".

== Features ==
The cemetery covers approximately eight acres (3 ha). The cemetery chapel was built in the Gothic style, with sandstone dressings and a red tiled roof. The date 1895 appears over the round-arched doorway in the porch. By 1996, the building had been converted to another use. In 2020, the cemetery was reported to have no remaining burial spaces.

== Burials ==
The Commonwealth War Graves Commission lists 37 military personnel buried in the cemetery who died as a result of their service in the First and Second World Wars.

=== Notable burials ===
- Private David Jenkins (1846–1912), 1st Battalion, 24th Regiment of Foot, who fought at the Battle of Rorke's Drift
- Edward Rice Daniel (1829–1905), High Sheriff of Glamorgan in 1891

== See also ==
- Oystermouth Cemetery, another cemetery in Swansea
