= William Charles Fuller =

Welsh recipient of the Victoria Cross

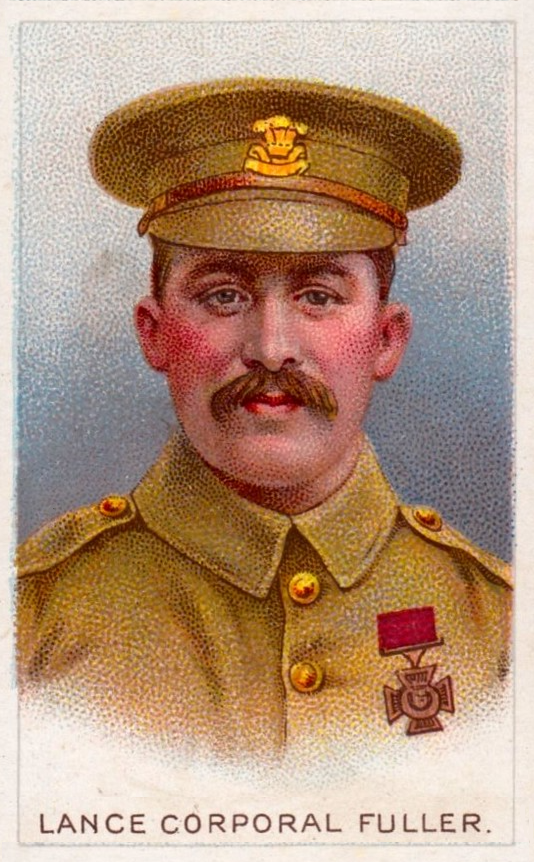
- Fuller on a cigarette card
- Born: 13 March 1884; Laugharne, Carmarthenshire, Wales
- Died: 29 December 1974 (aged 90); Swansea, Glamorganshire, Wales
- Burial place: Oystermouth Cemetery, West Glamorgan
- Military career
- Allegiance: United Kingdom
- Branch: British Army
- Service years: 1902–1915
- Rank: Sergeant
- Units: Welsh Regiment; Home Guard
- Conflicts: First World War; Second World War
- Awards: Victoria Cross; Mentioned in Despatches; Royal Humane Society Medal for Life-Saving

William Charles Fuller, VC (13 March 1884 – 29 December 1974) was a soldier in the British Army and a Welsh recipient of the Victoria Cross, the highest award for gallantry in the face of the enemy that can be awarded to British and Commonwealth forces. Fuller was the first Welsh recipient of the Victoria Cross in the First World War.

== Early life ==
Fuller was the son of William and Mary Fuller of Laugharne, Carmarthenshire, Wales. He was born in Laugharne on 13 March 1884. Educated in Swansea, he served in the British Army from 1902 to 1909. Fuller married Mary Elizabeth Phillips in 1909, and they had five children: four daughters (Mary, Doris, Muriel and Caroline); and one son, William. He was recalled to the army as a reservist in 1914.

== First World War ==
Fuller was 30 years old, and a lance corporal in the 2nd Battalion, Welsh Regiment, during the First World War when the following deed took place for which he was awarded the Victoria Cross.

On 14 September 1914 near Chivy-sur-Aisne, France, Fuller advanced under very heavy enemy rifle and machine-gun fire to extract an officer who was mortally wounded, and carried him back to cover. Fuller won his Victoria Cross for saving Captain Mark Haggard, nephew of Rider Haggard, who had fallen wounded. He carried him a distance estimated at 100 yards to a ridge where he managed to dress the officer's wounds. Captain Haggard asked Fuller to fetch his rifle from where he had fallen, because he did not want the enemy to get it. Fuller managed to do so.

With the help of two others, Private Snooks and Lieutenant Melvin, Officer in charge of the machine-gun section of the Welsh Regiment, they managed to get Haggard to the safety of a barn that was being used as a first-aid dressing station. Fuller remained with Haggard trying to help him until the officer died later on that evening, his last words being "Stick it, Welch." Fuller attended to two other officers who had also been brought to the barn wounded (Lieutenant The Honorable Fitzroy Somerset and Lieutenant Richards). The barn came under heavy fire, and the wounded men and officers were evacuated. Afterwards, the barn was razed to the ground via German shell-fire.

On 29 October, Fuller was wounded while dressing the wounds of Private Tagg; shrapnel entered his right side, twelve inches in up to his shoulder blade and came to rest on his right lung. Fuller was sent to Swansea Hospital where they operated, removing the shrapnel. Fuller was given a home posting after his recovery, as a recruiting sergeant in Wales.

== Later life and legacy ==
After the war he was awarded the Royal Humane Society Medal for Life-Saving for attempting to save a drowning child at Mumbles, South Wales. During the Second World War, Fuller served in the Swansea Home Guard. Fuller died on 29 December 1974 and was buried at Oystermouth Cemetery, Mumbles. A memorial stone was erected there in 2005.

== Bibliography ==
- Gliddon, Gerald (2011) [1994]. 1914. VCs of the First World War. The History Press. ISBN 978-0752459080.
