= Morfydd Llwyn Owen =

Welsh mezzo-soprano and composer (b. 1891)

- Born: 1 October 1891; Treforest, Wales
- Died: 7 September 1918 (aged 26); Swansea, Wales
- Education: Cardiff University
- Occupations: Musician, composer
- Spouse: Ernest Jones (m. 1917)

Piano introduction to the song Gweddi y Pechadur

Morfydd Llwyn Owen (1 October 1891 – 7 September 1918) was a Welsh composer, pianist and mezzo-soprano. A prolific composer, as well as a member of influential intellectual circles, she died at the age of 26.

== Early life and education ==
Owen was born in Treforest, Wales on 1 October 1891 to William Owen, an accountant, and his wife, Sara Jane (née Jones), who ran a drapery business. They were both amateur musicians. She was a musical child, showing great talent at an early age and received piano lessons early on. While in her teens she appeared as a soloist in a performance of the Grieg Piano Concerto. At 16 she began to study piano and composition with Dr David Evans in Cardiff and had her first published work, a hymn tune entitled "Morfydd", produced in 1909.

After attending Pontypridd County School and two years of study with Evans, Owen won a scholarship to study at University College, Cardiff and was formally admitted into the composition class. Many of her works were performed in student recitals at Cardiff, and she graduated in 1912. The same year, she was admitted to the Gorsedd of the Bards at the Wrexham National Eisteddfod under the name Morfydd Llwyn Owen, honouring the placename of her father's Montgomeryshire home Plas Llwyn Owen by adopting 'Llwyn' as her middle name.

Owen's parents were reluctant for her to continue her studies in London, but were persuaded to allow this partly by the intervention of the Liberal politician Eliot Crawshay-Williams. Owen and her father had jointly set Crawshay-Williams' poem Lullaby at Sunset to music, and her father wrote to him requesting permission for this to be published. Owen took her BA in music in July 1912 and was accepted by the Royal Academy of Music on the Goring Thomas scholarship, which she held for four years.

She took up her place at the Royal Academy in September 1912 where her principal study was composition, with piano and singing as second studies. She received individual composition lessons with Frederick Corder, who taught several other notable British composers. She was a very successful student and won two prizes in her first year: the Charles Lucas medal for composition, for her Nocturne in D♭ major, and the Oliveria Prescott prize for general excellence. She continued to accumulate awards during her time at the Royal Academy where her works – songs, part-songs and piano pieces including a sonata, pieces for violin and piano, trio for violin, cello and piano – were performed.

== Life and career in London ==
1924 edition of Owen's Nocturne in D♭ major for orchestra (1913). The fourth volume of a set of scores Ernest Jones commissioned as a tribute to his late wife and her "unerring integrity of soul in all that concerned her art".

While she was in London, Owen formed two separate circles of friends. The first of these centred on the Charing Cross Welsh Presbyterian Chapel, which was a central gathering point for many Welsh people living in London. Owen developed an especially close friendship with Lady Ruth Lewis, the wife of Sir John Herbert Lewis, the Liberal MP for Flintshire. Lady Lewis was an important figure in the Welsh Folk-Song Society of London and invited Owen to become involved with the organization. Owen obliged and transcribed, as well as wrote accompaniments to, many pieces for collections of Welsh Folk Songs. She provided musical examples to illustrate Lady Lewis's lectures on folk song and in 1914 they collaborated in publishing Folk-Songs Collected in Flintshire and the Vale of Clwyd. Owen knew David Lloyd George, then Secretary of State for War, who commissioned a work and chose her as the soprano soloist at the Cymanfa Ganu of the National Eisteddfod in Aberystwyth in 1916.

Owen's other social circle was centred on Hampstead, where she shared a flat with her friend Elizabeth Lloyd. Hampstead was the centre of the London literary set, and Owen associated with several of its members, including the writers D. H. Lawrence and Ezra Pound. She also was friends with several Russian émigrés, including Prince Felix Yusupov, who had been involved in the assassination of Rasputin, and Alexis Chodak-Gregory, who proposed marriage. It was through her Russian friendships, as well as influence of her work with Lady Lewis, that Owen developed a fascination with Russian folk song. In 1915 she asked for, and received, a fellowship from the University of Wales to visit Saint Petersburg to study the folk music of Russia, Norway and Finland. However, the First World War made overseas travel impossible. M Having developed her voice as a mezzo-soprano, in 1913 she sang four of her own compositions in a concert at London's Bechstein Hall: Chanson de Fortunio; Song from a Persian Village, Suo Gân and The Year's at the Spring. The same year her Nocturne in D♭ major was performed at the Queen's Hall, and she won the first prize for singing at a regional eisteddfod in Swansea. Her professional debut as a singer was in January 1917 at the Aeolian Hall in London. In July 1917 she premiered a performance of Harry Farjeon's song cycle A Lute of Jade at the Birkenhead National Eisteddfod. Later in the year her setting of the song For Jeanne's Sake was performed at the Henry Wood Promenade Concerts.

Owen was made a sub-professor at the Royal Academy of Music and in 1918 she was honoured with the Academy's Associate diploma, the ARAM.

== Marriage and death ==
Towards the end of 1916 Owen was introduced to the London Welsh psychoanalyst Ernest Jones and after a brief courtship they married at Marylebone Register Office on 6 February 1917. This came as shock to her circle of friends, few of whom were aware the ceremony was taking place. Her parents were unable to attend after Jones brought forward the ceremony by a day. As the leading exponent in Britain of Sigmund Freud's ideas, Jones was a highly controversial figure and an avowed atheist. He anticipated his wife would gradually relinquish the "simple-minded" beliefs of her religious faith. In response to the evident tensions in the marriage around this issue, Jones agreed to a marriage ceremony at the Charing Cross Welsh Presbyterian Chapel, which took place the following September with Owen's family and friends present. There were also tensions in the marriage around the role Jones expected his wife to take in supporting his busy professional and social life, inevitably at the expense of her career as a musician and output as a composer.

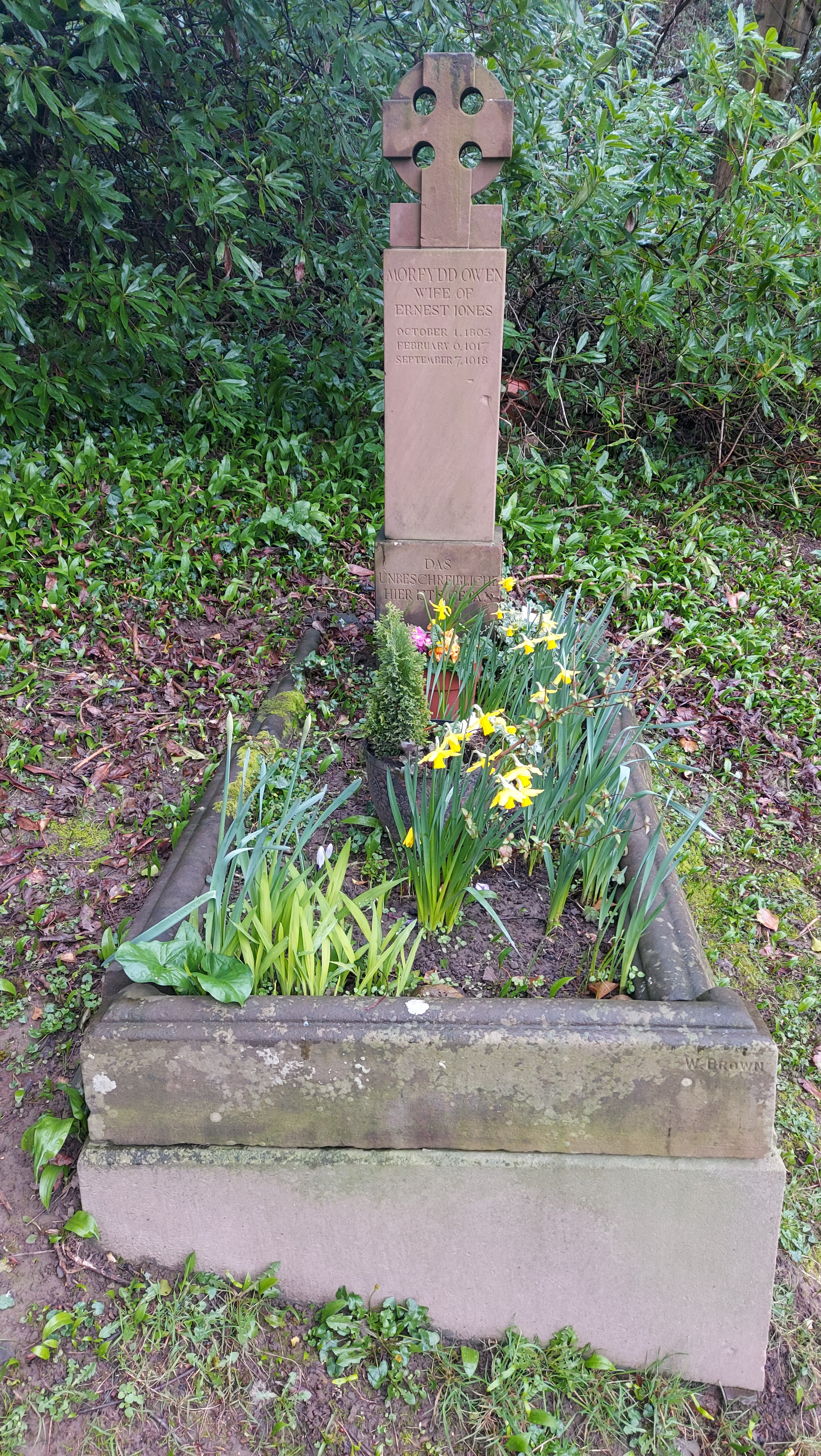
Grave of Morfydd Owen in Oystermouth Cemetery

In the summer of 1918 the couple were holidaying in South Wales, staying at the home of Jones's father at Oystermouth near Swansea, when Owen developed an acute appendicitis. Jones hoped his brother-in-law, the eminent surgeon Wilfred Trotter, would be able to travel to Swansea in time to operate but Trotter advised urgent surgical intervention was needed and the operation was conducted at the family home by William Frederick Brook, a leading South Wales surgeon. In his autobiography Jones gives an account of the days leading to her death on 7 September:

"after a few days [she] became delirious with a high temperature. We thought there was blood poisoning till I got Trotter from London. He at once recognized delayed chloroform poisoning. It had recently been discovered which neither the local doctor nor I had known, that this is a likelihood with a patient who is young, has suppuration in any part of the body, and has been deprived of sugar (as war conditions had then imposed); in such circumstances only ether is permissible as an anaesthetic. This simple piece of ignorance cost a valuable and promising life. We fought hard, and there were moments when we seemed to have succeeded, but it was too late."

On the basis of Jones's reference to "the best personal news" in his correspondence with Freud, Jones's biographer, Brenda Maddox, suggests that the reason that there was no subsequent autopsy was that Owen was pregnant and to have revealed this to her father and friends would have caused them further distress.

Owen was buried on 11 September in Oystermouth Cemetery, on the outskirts of Swansea, where her gravestone bears the inscription, chosen by Jones from Goethe's Faust: "Das Unbeschreibliche, hier ist's getan".

In 1924 Jones arranged, with the assistance of Frederick Corder, the publication of a four-volume memorial edition of selections of her orchestral and instrumental work and of her compositions for voice and piano. Thanking Jones for the copy he sent her, her close friend Elizabeth Lloyd wrote, "Each page brought fresh memories of our lost darling". Centenary editions of some of her songs and piano pieces were published in Cardiff in 1991.

== Works ==
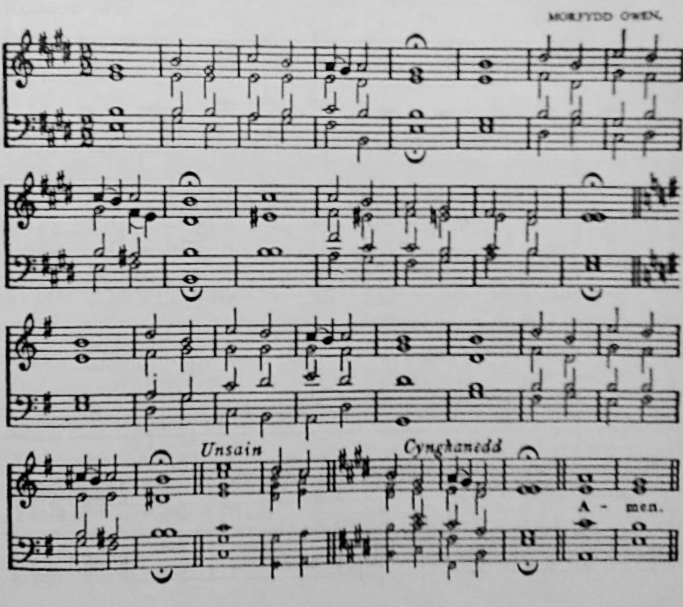
Pen Ucha (1916), a hymn tune by Morfydd Llwyn Owen

Though Owen only composed seriously for just over 10 years, she left a legacy of some 250 scores. These include pieces for chamber ensemble, piano, mixed choir and tone poems for orchestra. However, it is her compositions for voice and piano that are regarded as her most important and mature contributions. Many of them are unpublished and held as a Special Collection at the University of Cardiff. Her most well known include Slumber Song of the Madonna, To our Lady of Sorrows, Suo Gân and her masterpiece in Welsh, Gweddi y Pechadur ("A sinner's prayer"). There were also some 22 hymn tunes and several anthems.

In the centenary year of her death, the 2018 Proms season programmed the BBC National Orchestra of Wales and its Principal Conductor Thomas Søndergård performing the Nocturne in D♭ major for full orchestra of 1913.

In October 2024, and again in October 2026, the Gŵyl Morfydd Owen Festival was held in Pontypridd.

== Selected compositions ==
Works from the 1924 memorial edition of Owen's work, with authors' names in brackets.

=== Orchestral works ===
- 1910 Romance for strings
- 1911 A Cycle of Sea Songs for mezzo and orchestra
- 1911 Sea Drift (Walt Whitman), scena for mezzo and orchestra
- 1911 Country Dance for small orchestra
- 1912 Ave Maria for mezzo, chorus and strings
- 1912 Beatific Sea for string orchestra
- 1912 Love's Music, for soprano and orchestra (score lost; parts survive)
- 1912 My Sorrow, for soprano and orchestra (E. Crawshay Williams)
- 1913 Chorus for soprano, choir and orchestra
- 1913 Nocturne in D♭ major for orchestra
- 1913 Prelude in F major for orchestra (incomplete)
- 1913 Toward the Unknown Region, scena for mezzo and orchestra
- 1914 Morfa Rhuddlan, tone-poem for orchestra
- 1915 Pro Patria, cantata for soprano and baritone, chorus and orchestra (William Hughes Jones)
- 1916 Threnody for the Passing of Branwen, for string orchestra
- 1916 Funeral March to Branwen, for orchestra

=== Choral works ===
- 1911 Sweet and Low, part-song (Tennyson)
- 1911 The Refugee, for mixed choir and piano (Schiller)
- 1911 Fierce Raged the Tempest (Thring)
- 1913 Jubilate Deo for chorus, organ and brass

=== Chamber music ===
- 1910 Romance for violin and piano
- 1915 The Cathedral at Liège and The Cathedral at Rheims, piano trio, written under the pseudonym 'Lenavanmo'

=== Piano music ===
- 1908 Minuet and Trio
- 1910 Piano Sonata in E minor
- 1912 Maida Vale, tone poem
- 1914 Four Welsh Impressions
- 1914 Rhapsody in C♯ minor
- 1914 Prelude in E minor
- ? Glantaf, tone poem

=== Hymn tunes ===
- 1908 Treforest (Thomas Jones)
- 1909 Morfydd
- 1913 Gweddi y Pechadur (Thomas Williams)
- 1915 Llwyn Owen (Williams Pantycelyn)
- 1915 Richard (Williams Pantycelyn)
- 1915 Sarah (Williams Pantycelyn)
- 1915 Calvary (William Owen)
- 1915 William (John Caergyli/Rhoslan K. Jones)
- 1916 Pen Ucha, (Williams Pantycelyn)

=== Songs ===
- 1910 Be Thou Exallted
- 1911 A Song of Sorrow (William Blake)
- 1911 An Indian Night (Eliot Crawshay-Williams)
- 1911 Blow, blow thou winter wind (Shakespeare)
- 1911 Daisy's Song (Keats)
- 1911 Gweddi Y Pechadur (Thomas Williams)
- 1911 Lullaby at Sunset (Eliot Crawshay-Williams)
- 1911 Mirage (Eliot Crawshay-Williams)
- 1911 The Nightingale (Jean Ingelow)
- 1911 Orbits (Richard le Gallienne)
- 1911 Sweet love, now I must leave thee
- 1912 Clancy's Song (G. B. Connolly)
- 1912 Infant Joy (William Blake)
- 1912 My Love's Like a Red, Red Rose, part-song
- 1912 Pippa's Song - A Year at the Spring (Robert Browning)
- 1912 The Willow Song (Mrs Hemans)
- 1912 To Our Lady of Sorrows (Wilfred Hinton)
- 1913 Oh when my righteous judge? (Lady Huntingdon)
- 1913 A Serenade
- 1913 Beatific Sea (Campbell)
- 1913 By the lone sea shore (Charles Mackay)
- 1913 Chanson de Fortunio (Alfred de Musset)
- 1913 Foredoomed (P. Bourke Marston)
- 1913 Haurahan reproves the curlew (W. B. Yeats)
- 1913 Hedh laments the loss of his love (W. B. Yeats)
- 1913 If I had but two little wings (Coleridge)
- 1913 Mountain Song (Carlton Hill)
- 1913 Slumber-Song of the Madonna (Alfred Noyes)
- 1913 Song from a Persian Village (E. Crayshaw Williams)
- 1913 Spring (William Blake)
- 1913 Suo Gân (Robert Bryan)
- 1913 The Fairies' Wedding (Eos Gwalia)
- 1913 The Sea hath its Pearls (Heine/Longfellow)
- 1914 A Mother's Lullaby (Morfydd Owen)
- 1914 April (William Hinton)
- 1914? Dear Home in The Hills (Ethel Newman)
- 1914 Fun o' the Fair (Ethel Newman)
- 1914 God Made a Lovely Garden (Mabel Spence)
- 1914 Goldfish (Ethel Newman)
- 1914 La Tristesse (Alfred de Musset)
- 1914 The Lamb (William Blake)
- 1914 To Violets (Robert Herrick)
- 1914 Two Songs of a Slave (Ethel Newman)
- 1915 All in the April Evening (Katherine Tynan)
- 1915 Emyn Moliant (R. R. Morris)
- 1915 Trugarha wathyft, O Dhuw: A Vesper
- 1915 What does little birdie say? (Tennyson)
- 1916 A Little Song (Wilfid Roland Childe)
- 1916 Away in a Manger
- 1916 Good Friday (Katherine Tynan)
- 1916 He prayeth best who loveth best (Coleridge)
- 1916 I Saw Three Ships (Katherine Tynan)
- 1916 In Cradle Land (Eos Gwalia)
- 1916 Jesus, Tender Saviour
- 1916 Mister Rain (Richard Aldington)
- 1916 Nature's Bride (Eos Gwalia)
- 1916 O See the Sky! (D. Middleman)
- 1916 Resurrection (Katherine Tynan)
- 1916 Shepherd's Love Song
- 1916 The Maid at the Wheel (Ethel Newman)
- 1916 The Almond Tree of Mulvaney (Wilfid Roland Childe)
- 1916 The Dream of Mary (Katherine Tynan)
- 1916 The Ploughman's Lass (Ethel Newman)
- 1916 The Silent Sounds to the Soldier's Tread (A. E. Housman)
- 1916 The Weeping Babe (Katherine Tynan)
- 1916 William (Eric Hiller)
- 1916 The Land of Hush-a-bye (Eos Gwalia)
- 1917 A Noontide Lullaby (Ethel Newman)
- 1917 An Irish Lullaby
- 1917 Look at me, Sam (Thomas Edward Brown)
- 1917 Patrick's Your Boy (Ethel Newman)
- 1917 Pitter Patter (Douglas Ainslie)
- 1917 When I came Last to Ludlow (A. E. Housman)
- 1918 Fussy Hills (Eos Gwalia)
- 1918 Impenitent (Ethel Newman)
- 1918 Mary (P. J. O'Reilly)
- 1918 Speedwell (A. Eversley)
- 1918 Sunshine Town (P. J. O'Reilly)
- ? Sweet Mother, Comfort me

== Discography ==
- Morfydd Owen: Portrait of a Lost Icon, Elin Manahan Thomas (soprano), Brian Ellsbury (piano), Tŷ Cerdd (2016)

This recording of songs and piano works includes the Four Flower Songs, Gweddi y Pechadur (The Sinner's Prayer), Branwen (the original piano sketch for the 1916 piece for strings Threnody for the Passing of Branwen), the Piano Sonata in E minor (1910) and the Rhapsody in C♯ minor (1914)

- Welsh Impressions, Zoe Smith (piano), Tŷ Cerdd, 2019

This recording of Welsh solo piano music takes its title from and features the Four Welsh Impressions.

- Songs and Piano Works, Gail Pearson (soprano), Christopher Williams (piano). Oriana Publications (2026)

Contains 26 songs including 16 first recordings, and piano works including the Four Welsh Impressions

=== Works in compilation recordings ===
- Great Welsh Songs, performed by Stuart Burrows and John Constable, recorded by Enigma, 1978 (LP)
- Composers of Wales, performed by Janet Price, Kenneth Bowen et al., recorded by Argo, 1974 (LP)
- Y Teulu O'Neill, performed by Andrew O'Neill, Dennis O'Neill, et al., recorded by Sain, 1980 (LP)
- Cerddoriaeth Cymru: The Music of Wales performed by Osian Ellis, John Scott, et al., recorded by Curiad, 1996 (CD)
- Songs of Dilys Elwyn-Edwards and Morfydd 'Llwyn' Owen performed by Helen Field, recorded by Sain, 2005 (CD)
- Romance for Strings (1911), Royal Philharmonic Orchestra, Owain Arwel Hughes on Welsh Music for Strings, Rubicon RCD1198 (2025)

== Bibliography ==
- Cleaver, Emrys (1968). "Morfydd Llwyn Owen (1891-1918)" in Musicians of Wales. Ruthin: John Jones.
- Davies, Evan Thomas (1959). "Owen, Morfydd Llwyn". Dictionary of Welsh Biography. National Library of Wales.
- Davies, Rhian (1994). Never So Pure a Sight: Morfydd Owen (1891–1918) A Life in Pictures. Llandysul: Gomer.
- Davies, Rhian (2001). "Owen, Morfydd". Grove Music Online (8th ed.). Oxford University Press. doi:10.1093/gmo/9781561592630.article.45643. ISBN 978-1-56159-263-0. (subscription, Wikilibrary access, or UK public library membership required) "(subscription required)
- Davies, Rhian (2018), 'An incalculable loss': Morfydd Owen (1891-1918), Illuminate
- Davies, T.G. (2018) "Marwolaeth Morfudd Llwyn Owen", Y Traethodydd vol. 173, no. 725.
- Fuller, Sophie (1994). "Morfydd Owen: 1891-1918." The Pandora Guide to Women Composers, Britain and the United States 1629 – present London: Pandora.
- Jones, Ernest (1990) [1959]. Free Associations: Memories of a Psycho-Analyst. London: Transaction Publishers.
- Jones, Keith Davies (2007), Morfydd Owen, The Welsh Society of Manitoba
- Maddox, Brenda (2006). Freud's Wizard: The Enigma of Ernest Jones. London: John Murray.
- Seddon, Laura (28 October 2013). British Women Composers and Instrumental Chamber Music in the Early Twentieth Century. Ashgate Publishing, Ltd. p. 142. ISBN 978-1-4724-0215-8.
- Morfydd Owen Memorial Edition, 4 Volumes. The Anglo-French Music Company Ltd, London 1924

Vol. I Songs 1916-1918
Vol. II Songs 1911-1914
Vol. III Selected Pianoforte Works
Vol. IV. Nocturne in D♭ major for orchestra.
