= Oystermouth Cemetery =

Cemetery in Mumbles, Swansea, Wales

Coordinates: 51.5772°N 4.0108°W

Oystermouth Cemetery (Welsh: Mynwentydd Ystumllwynarth) is a municipal cemetery in the village of Oystermouth, Swansea, South Wales. It was opened in 1883 and remains in use today, administered by the Cemeteries and Crematorium Division of the City and County of Swansea. It contains 14,162 grave spaces.

The cemetery contains the Commonwealth war graves of 83 service personnel, 28 from the First World War and 55 from the Second World War.

The cemetery offers a "woodland burial ground" as an alternative to traditional burial or cremation, the first of its kind in south-west Wales.

== Notable interments ==
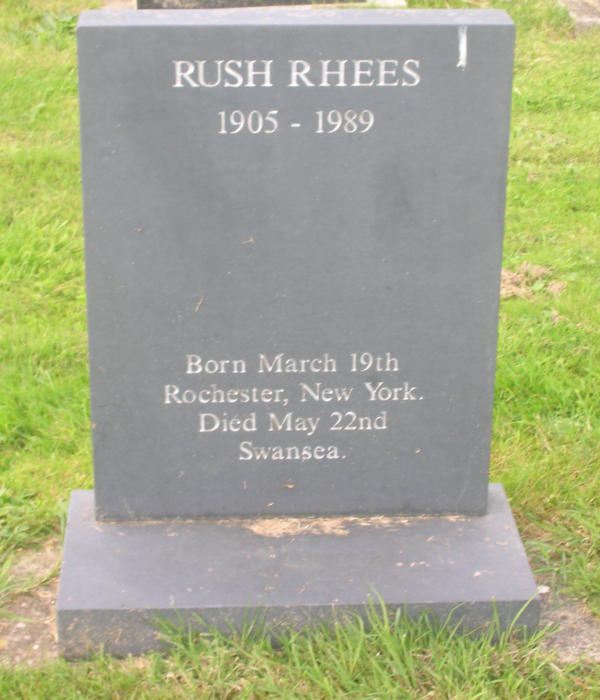
Grave of Rush Rhees

- Graham Chadwick (1922–2008), Christian missionary
- Sir John Bryn Edwards (1889–1922), 1st Baronet, ironmaster and philanthropist
- Henry Folland (1878–1926), Welsh industrialist
- Leah Norah Folland (1874–1957), Welsh educator and politician
- Trevor Ford (1923–2003), Welsh international footballer
- William Charles Fuller VC (1884–1974), recipient of the Victoria Cross during the First World War
- John Jones Jenkins, 1st Baron Glantawe (1835–1915), tin-plate manufacturer and Liberal politician
- Morfydd Llwyn Owen (1891–1918), musician and composer
- Harry Parr-Davies (1914–1955), composer
- Rush Rhees (1905–1989), philosopher and lecturer at Swansea University
- James Allan Smith (1907–1981), former Dean of St Davids
- Daniel Lleufer Thomas (1863-1940), barrister, social reformer and writer
- Jeremiah Williams (1871–1950), barrister and Liberal politician
- William Williams (1840–1904), former MP for the Swansea District and owner of the Worcester Tinplate Works in Morriston

All eight members of the volunteer crew of the lifeboat RNLB Edward, Prince of Wales (ON 678), who lost their lives in the Mumbles lifeboat disaster on 23 April 1947, are interred in the cemetery. They are:

- William John Gammon, coxswain, aged 46
- William Noel, second coxswain, aged 42
- William Gilbert Davies, first motor mechanic, aged 42
- Ernest Griffin, assistant second motor mechanic, aged 51
- William Richard Scourfield Thomas, bowman, aged 48
- William Lewis Howell, boatman, aged 32
- William Ronald Thomas, boatman, aged 34
- Richard Smith, boatman, aged 35

== See also ==
- Cwmgelli Cemetery, another cemetery in Swansea
