= Leah Norah Folland =

Welsh educator and politician (1874–1957)

Folland in 1923

Mrs Leah Norah Folland JP CBE (1874 – 12 March 1957), was a Welsh educationalist, philanthropist and Liberal Party politician.

== Background ==
Folland was born Leah Norah Thomas (sometimes known as Lilly), at Pontypool, the daughter of Reverend John Thomas, the Baptist minister at Penclawdd. In 1906 she married Henry Folland (1878–1926), Welsh industrialist and tin plate manufacturer. They had one son, Dudley Croft Folland and one daughter, Patti Eugenie Folland. She is buried alongside members of her family in Oystermouth Cemetery, Mumbles, Wales, UK.

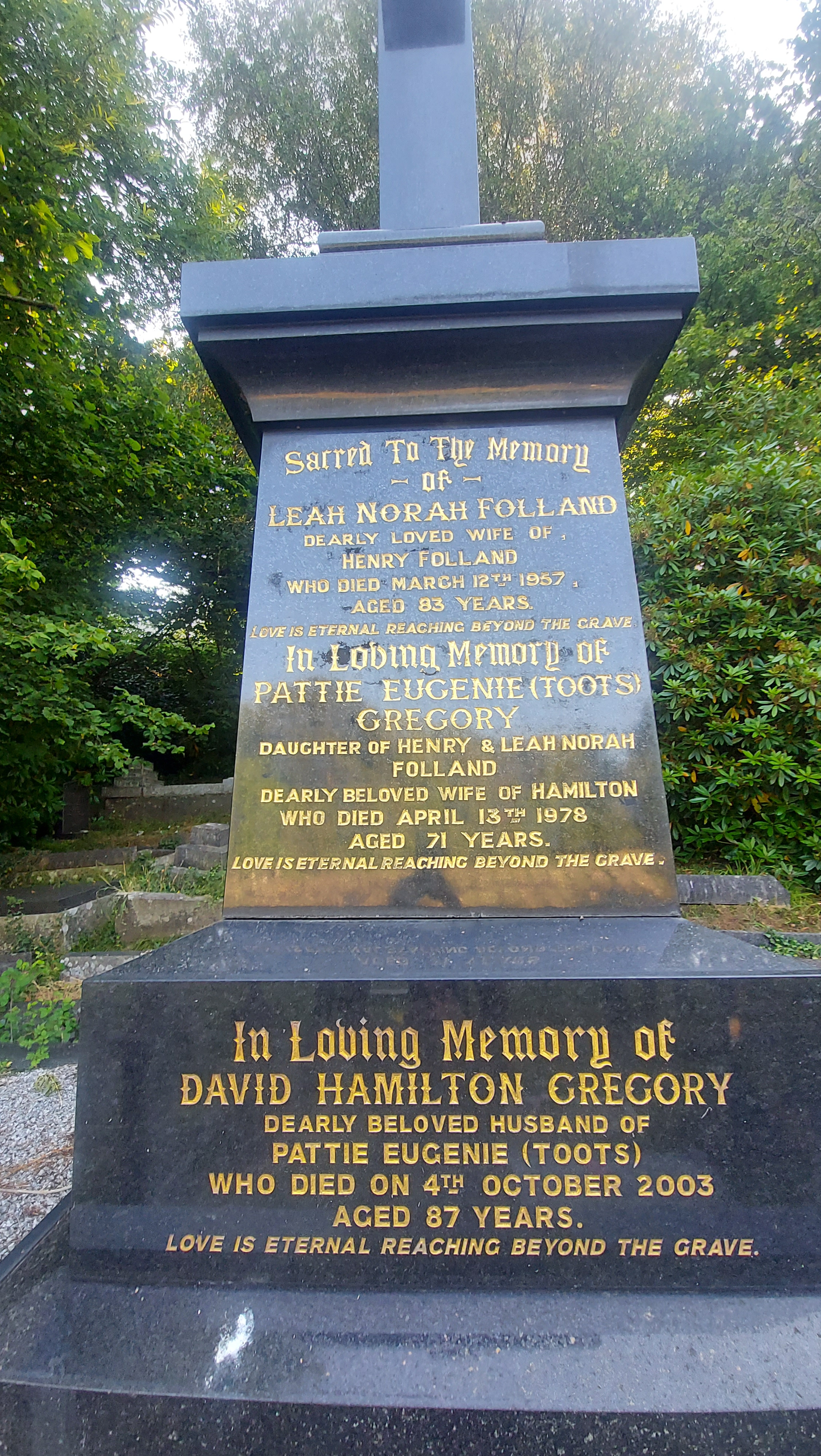
Leah Norah Folland. Welsh educator and politician (1874–1957)

== Professional career ==
Folland worked as a teacher at Crwys School at Three Crosses, Swansea and then at Gorseinon School. She was a Justice of the Peace. She was a member of the Council of the University College of Swansea.

== Political career ==
Folland was Liberal candidate for the Gower division at the 1923 General Election. She came second, polling 40.9%. She did not stand for parliament again. In 1939 she was awarded the CBE for political and public services in South Wales.

=== Electoral record ===
General Election 1923: Gower
Party	Candidate	Votes	%	±%
Labour	David Grenfell	14,771	59.1	+4.9
Liberal	Leah Norah Folland	10,219	40.9	−4.9
Majority		4,552	18.2	+9.8
Turnout		24,990	73.0	−1.6
Registered electors		34,250		
Labour hold		Swing	+4.9	
