= Mynydd Bach, Ceredigion =

Village in Ceredigion, Wales

Coordinates: 52.372421°N 3.883754°W

Mynydd Bach
- Location within Ceredigion
- OS grid reference: SN 7185 7660
  - Cardiff: 68.5 mi (110.2 km)
  - London: 170.7 mi (274.7 km)
- Community: Pontarfynach
- Principal area: Ceredigion
- Country: Wales
- Sovereign state: United Kingdom
- Post town: Aberystwyth
- Postcode district: SY23
- Police: Dyfed-Powys
- Fire: Mid and West Wales
- Ambulance: Welsh
- UK Parliament: Ceredigion Preseli
- Senedd Cymru – Welsh Parliament: Ceredigion Penfro

Mynydd Bach is a hamlet in the community of Pontarfynach, Ceredigion, Wales, which is 68.5 miles (110.3 km) from Cardiff and 170.7 miles (274.7 km) from London. Mynydd Bach is represented in the Senedd by Elin Jones (Plaid Cymru) and is part of the Ceredigion Preseli constituency in the House of Commons.

== See also ==
- Bontnewydd, Ceredigion
- List of Scheduled prehistoric Monuments in Ceredigion - two cairns on Mynydd Bach
- List of localities in Wales by population
