= Daniel James (Gwyrosydd) =

Daniel James (23 January 1848 – 16 March 1920), also known by his bardic name of Gwyrosydd, was a Welsh poet and hymn-writer, best known for writing the words of the popular hymn, "Calon Lân" (published in 1892).

== Early life ==
Daniel James came from Treboeth in Swansea. His father died when he was young. He became a puddler at Morriston ironworks, and afterwards worked at Landore tinplate works.

He began to write verse and assumed the bardic name Gwyrosydd (probably meaning "place of privets" (gwyros & territorial suffix -ydd) or possibly "Gower moorlands" (Gŵyr & rhosydd)). He later found work in Tredegar, Dowlais Ironworks, Blaengarw, and Mountain Ash, Rhondda Cynon Taff, where he spent 20 years.

== Later life ==
He returned to Morriston in 1918 to live with his daughter, and died at Tanylan, Morriston on 16 March 1920. He was buried at Mynyddbach Cemetery, and a memorial tablet was placed at Treboeth Public Hall in 1936.

== Legacy ==
Much of his verse appeared in periodicals and newspapers, but collections were also published. Calon Lân is easily his most popular hymn, and regularly tops the lists of favourite Welsh hymns. He is thought to have written the words while he lived at Blaengarw. In 2008 Parc Calon Lan was opened by Huw Edwards at the top of the Valley in Blaengarw.

In 2013 work began on an animated film of his life. The project is a collaboration between the Treboeth History Group, Swansea University and several local primary schools.

In February 2018 a group of local residents in Treboeth gathered to plan a commemorative event to mark the centenary of the death of Daniel James in March 2020. This meeting formed the basis for the creation of The Calon Lan Society, which is dedicated to promoting the hymn and those involved in composing it.
