= Thomas Rees (Unitarian) =

Welsh Unitarian minister and scholar

Thomas Rees (1777 – 1 August 1864), Welsh Nonconformist divine, was a Unitarian minister and scholar.

Rees was educated at the Presbyterian College, Carmarthen. He entered the Unitarian ministry in 1807 at the Newington Green Unitarian Church, London. He went to Southwark in 1813, earned the degree of LL.D. of Glasgow in 1819, and went to Stamford Street, Blackfriars, in 1823.

He had great knowledge of the history of anti-trinitarian opinion, especially of the 16th century. He published papers, chiefly in the Monthly Repository between 1818 and 1822, on such subjects as Faustus Socinus and Francis David, including The Italian Reformation, Memoirs of the Socini. Financial troubles drove him to Spain in 1853, and he died in obscurity in Brighton.

== Life ==
He was born in Gelligron, Glamorgan, the son of Josiah Rees; George Owen Rees was his nephew. He started in the bookselling business, but on the advice of Abraham Rees (no relation), he was educated for the ministry (1799–1801) at Carmarthen College.

In 1807 Rees became afternoon preacher at Newington Green Chapel, London, of which he had sole charge from 1808 to 1813, when he moved to St. Thomas's Chapel, Southwark, which was closed in 1822. On 12 October 1823 a new chapel was opened in Stamford Street, Blackfriars, London, built from the proceeds of the sales of St. Thomas's Chapel and the chapel in Prince's Street, Westminster. Here Rees ministered till 1831, when he ceased to hold regular ministerial charge.

Rees was a fellow of the Society of Arts, and received the degree of LL.D. in January 1819 from Glasgow University. He was a trustee of Dr. Williams's Foundation from 1809 to 1853, a member of the Presbyterian board from 1813, its secretary from 1825 to 1853, and some time secretary of the London Unitarian Society.

From 1828 to 1835 he was secretary to the London union of ministers of the "three denominations". His rejection in 1835 was resented by the unitarians, who claimed to represent the Presbyterians, from whom the secretary had until then been chosen. They seceded from the union, and obtained the separate privilege of presenting addresses to the throne. Rees in 1837 was appointed by government as principal receiver of the English regium donum, on the nomination of the three denominations.

In 1853 Rees left England for Spain, being unable to meet charges in regard to trust funds; but ultimately he made full restitution. He died in obscurity at Brighton, on 1 August 1864. His wife, Elizabeth, died at Hythe on 20 August 1856.

== Works ==
Rees made a collection of the literature of antitrinitarian opinion, especially during the 16th century. His intention, announced by 1833, of publishing a comprehensive work, was never fulfilled; the Antitrinitarian Biography by Robert Wallace appeared in 1850.

For Rees's Cyclopædia he contributed articles on biography, various miscellaneous topics, and examined and described the plates.

Rees published, besides single sermons (1804–46):

- The Beauties of South Wales, 1815 (see Edward Wedlake Brayley).
- The Racovian Catechism in Latin translation; with a prefixed Sketch of the History of Unitarianism in Poland, 1818.
- A Sketch of the History of the Regium Donum, 1834.

His historical papers included:

- Faustus Socinus and Francis David in the Monthly Repository (as were the next three), 1818;
- On the Sentiments of the Early Continental Reformers respecting Religious Liberty (1819);
- Italian Reformation (1822);
- Memoirs of the Socini (1827); and
- Calvin and Servetus, in the Christian Reformer, 1847.

Rees left in manuscript The Anti-papal Reformers of Italy in the Sixteenth Century, with a Glance at their Forerunners, the Sectaries of the Middle Ages, in six volumes; also a manuscript translation, with notes, of Orelli's Life of Lælius Socinus. His promised memoir of Abraham Rees never appeared.

== Sources ==
- This article incorporates text from a publication now in the public domain: "Rees, Thomas (1777-1864)". Dictionary of National Biography. London: Smith, Elder & Co. 1885–1900.
