= Josiah Rees =

Welsh Unitarian minister (1744–1804)

Josiah Rees (2 October 1744 – 20 September 1804) was a Welsh Unitarian minister.

== Life ==
Born in the parish of Llanfair-ar-y-Bryn, near Llandovery, he was son of Owen Rees (1717–1768), the first nonconformist minister in the parish of Aberdare, by Mary his wife, who lived to complete her hundredth year. After attending the grammar school at Swansea, he entered around 1762 Carmarthen College, and became minister-elect of the church at Gellionen in 1764, while pursuing his studies at the college for two years longer. Among his fellow students was his lifelong friend, the Rev. David Davis.

Rees was also, until about 1785, a successful schoolmaster. He became known as a preacher, and published some sermons. His chapel was rebuilt and enlarged in 1801. In 1785 he declined the offer of the principalship of the presbyterian college, then in Swansea, but gave a year's course there of divinity lectures.

Rees was married twice, and by his second wife was the father of several sons, including Thomas Rees.

== Works ==
In literature Rees's first and major venture was the Welsh magazine Trysorfa Gwybodaeth, neu yr Eurgrawn Cymraeg. It was the first sustained publication of the kind in Wales: a similar magazine, Tlysau yr Hen Oesoedd (English: Gems of Ancient Times), projected in 1735 by Lewis Morris, only lasted one number. Rees's Trysorfa was produced at his own expense. The first number—32 pages at 3d.—appeared on 3 March 1770; it was published by John Ross of Carmarthen. Fourteen fortnightly numbers followed. The magazine was discontinued with the fifteenth number, on 15 September 1770, for want of support. With every number were given eight pages of Caradoc of Llancarfan's Brut y Tywysogion (English: Chronicle of the Princes).

Rees's Collection of Hymns, 1796, some from his own and his father's pen, and a Collection of Psalms, mostly after Isaac Watts, 1797, were in use for many years in the Unitarian churches of South Wales; they were not entirely replaced until 1878. A third edition was published in 1834.

Rees's translations into Welsh included a Catechism (1770) on the Principles of Religion, by Henry Read (?); John Mason's Self-Knowledge, which passed through numerous editions; and a Doctrinal Treatise, published in 1804 under the auspices of the Welsh Unitarian Book Society; it evoked from Joseph Harris a defence of the deity of Jesus, The Axe of Christ in the Forest of Antichrist.

== Sources ==
- "Rees, Josiah" . Dictionary of National Biography. London: Smith, Elder & Co. 1885–1900.

Attribution

This article incorporates text from a publication now in the public domain: "Rees, Josiah". Dictionary of National Biography. London: Smith, Elder & Co. 1885–1900.
