= Mynydd-bach (electoral ward) =

Coordinates: 51.66451°N 3.95335°W

Mynydd-bach ward
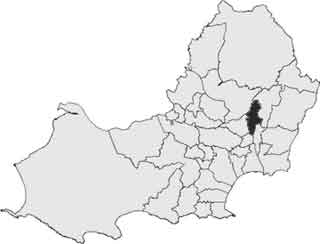
- Area: 3.57 km^{2} (1.38 sq mi)
- Population: 8,872 (2011 census)
  - Density: 2,485/km^{2} (6,440/sq mi)
- Principal area: Swansea
- Preserved county: West Glamorgan
- Country: Wales
- Sovereign state: United Kingdom
- UK Parliament: Swansea East
- Senedd Cymru – Welsh Parliament: Swansea East
- Councillors: Mike Lewis (Labour); Jess Pritchard (Labour); Sam Pritchard (Labour)

Mynydd-bach, formerly Mynyddbach (Welsh: Mynydd-bach) is an electoral ward in the City and County of Swansea, Wales.

Mynydd-bach is bounded by the wards of Morriston and Landore to the east, Cwmbwrla to the south, and Llangyfelach and Penderry to the west.

The electoral ward consists of some or all of the following areas: Clase, Clasemont, Mynydd-Bach, Park View Estate, Penfillia Estate, Treboeth, Tirdeunaw, Pinewood, Mynydd Garnlywd and Bryn Rock, in the parliamentary constituency of Swansea East.

For electoral purposes, Mynydd-bach is broken down into the polling districts of: Mynydd Garnlwyd, Bryn Rock, Treboeth, Penfilia, Tirdeunaw, Clasemont and Clase. Mynydd-Bach returns 3 councillors to the City and County of Swansea council.

In 2022 the ward was officially renamed Mynydd-bach on the recommendation of the Welsh Language Commissioner.

== 2022 local council elections ==
Voter turnout for Mynyddbach in the 2022 local council elections was 31%. The results of the election were:

Candidate	Party	Votes	Status
Mike Lewis	Labour	1485	Labour hold
Jess Pritchard	Labour	1389	Labour hold
Sam Pritchard	Labour	1313	Labour hold
Paul Raymond Morris	Conservative	457	
Aminia Ann Jamaluddin	Liberal Democrats	357	

== 2017 local council elections ==
Voter turnout for Mynyddbach in the 2017 local council elections was 33.53%. The results of the election were:

Candidate	Party	Votes	Status
Mike Lewis	Labour	1605	Labour hold
Sam Pritchard	Labour	1275	Labour hold
Gloria Tanner	Labour	1268	Labour hold
Thomas Morgan	Conservative	625	
Marina Phyllis Howells	Conservative	565	
Thomas Brian Howells	Conservative	549	

== 2012 local council elections ==
Voter turnout for Mynyddbach in the 2012 local council elections was 34.9%. The results of the election were:

Candidate	Party	Votes	Status
Ceinwen Thomas	Labour	1348	Labour hold
Byron George Owen	Labour	1321	Labour hold
Gloria Tanner	Labour	1190	Labour gain
Robert Welsby	Independents	699	
Audrey Clement	Independents	683	
Noel West	Independents	476	
Ann Jamal	Liberal Democrats	215	
John Ward	Conservative	199	
Emma Lynall	Conservative	135	
