= Mynyddbach Chapel =

Coordinates: 51°39′32.00″N 3°56′59″W

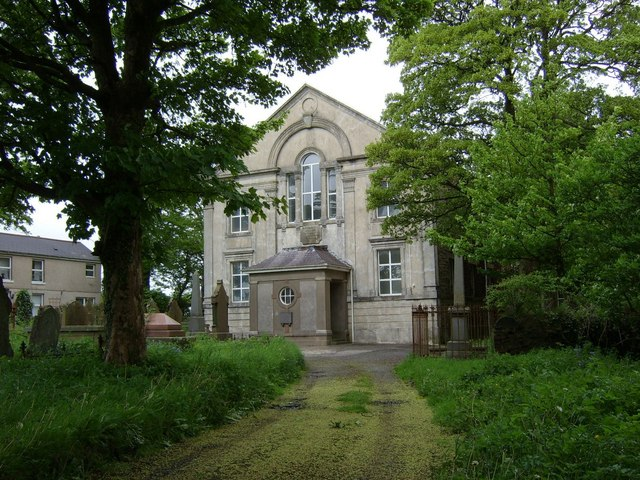

Mynyddbach Chapel is the oldest Independent chapel in Swansea, Wales. In about 1640 a group of people met on the Sabbath and on week nights to read the Scriptures and have prayer in "Cilfwnwr" farmhouse near Llangyfelach and later at "Tirdwncyn". They continued to meet as a properly constituted church until 1762. In 1720–59 the minister at "Tirdwncyn" was Samuel Jones. A piece of land was leased in 1761 and a chapel built there shortly afterwards, at Tirdoncyn-newydd near Llangyfelach. In 1867 the new chapel was built; it was extensively renovated in the 1930s.

When it was first built, the chapel was at the centre of the nonconformist movement in Wales. Because of the persecution of the nonconformists it had to be built at least five miles outside the town Boundaries of Swansea.

In 2011 the chapel was being threatened with demolition, but a group of local people, together with the remaining members and trustees of the chapel under the leadership of Reverend Grenville Fisher, Melvin John Davies and many other trustees a Congregational minister, established the Mynyddbach Chapel Project. The aim of the project is to secure the future of the building and grounds as an Arts and Culture centre, to serve the local community and the wider area, whilst retaining its religious and spiritual significance.

The Mynyddbach Chapel Project operates from the Calon Lân Centre which is based at Mynyddbach Chapel

== Mynyddbach Cemetery ==
John Humphrey, known as God's architect and the architect of the new Mynyddbach chapel, is buried here. He also designed the Tabernacle Chapel, Morriston.

The poet Daniel James (Gwyrosydd), who wrote the words of the Welsh hymn, Calon Lân, is buried at Mynyddbach. Calon Lân is known as the second National Anthem of Wales.
