= William Dawson Hooker =

William Dawson Hooker, M.D. (1816–1840) was a British medical doctor and botanist, the son of Sir William Jackson Hooker and an elder brother to Sir Joseph Dalton Hooker, the botanists who created the Royal Botanic Gardens, Kew.

== Life ==
Hooker was born on 4 April 1816. He studied medicine from 1832 at Glasgow University, where in 1838 he earned his M.D. He was appointed "Professor of Materia Medica" at the Andersonian University the same year. An 1839 dissertation on the cinchonas and their use in treating malarial fever earned him admission to the Faculty of Physicians and Surgeons of Glasgow. The same year he travelled to northern Norway, producing notes on various topics including local customs of the Laplanders, flora, and fauna. Intending to improve his poor health, he took passage to Kingston, Jamaica, but instead died there of yellow fever on 7 January 1840.

== Family ==
Hooker was married to Isabella Whitehead. Their only child was Willielma Hooker (1840–1879), who was born after his death. She in turn married James Campbell in 1862. Willielma's eldest child was named William Jackson Hooker Campbell, after his great-grandfather. She died while giving birth to a stillborn child, leaving six others.

== Works ==
- Hooker, William Dawson (1839). Notes on Norway; or, A brief journal of a tour made to the northern parts of Norway, in the summer of MDCCCXXXVI (2nd ed.). Glasgow. OCLC 14044490. (unpublished)
- Hooker, William Dawson (1839). Inaugural dissertation upon the cinchonas, their history, uses, and effects. Glasgow: Edward Khull. OCLC 16749377.
