= Calon Lân =

1890s Welsh traditional song

"Calon Lân" (Welsh for 'A Pure Heart') is a Welsh hymn, the words of which were written in the 1890s by Daniel James (Gwyrosydd) and sung to a tune by John Hughes. The song was originally written as a hymn, but has become firmly established as a rugby anthem, associated with the Welsh rugby union, being sung before almost every Test match involving the Welsh national team – though more likely to be heard sung at matches involving the Welsh football team in recent years. In 2007 the song was one of the traditional Welsh songs to make it to the screen in an S4C television series Codi Canu, an attempt to bring traditional four-part harmony choral singing back to the Welsh rugby terraces.

The opening few bars of Calon Lân, sung by Stuart Burrows

In 2012, the Welsh group Only Boys Aloud sang "Calon Lân" on the British ITV show Britain's Got Talent, coming third in the final. It has since become the most watched Welsh-language video on YouTube.

"Calon Lân" is unusual among the most popular Welsh traditional songs in that an English-language version of the words is virtually never sung (unlike, for example, Cwm Rhondda), but the tune does appear, for example, in the British Methodist hymn book Hymns and Psalms, set to the lyrics of "I will Sing the Wondrous Story" by Francis Harold Rowley. Hymn 223, The English singing translation by Rees Harris (1874–1954) appeared in The Abingdon Song Book in 1937.

A Spanish-language version of the song exists, sung mostly by Welsh Argentines in Y Wladfa, the former Welsh colony in Patagonia.

On 10 September 2019, the song was sung in the UK House of Commons by Plaid Cymru and Welsh Labour members of parliament who were protesting about Brexit and the prorogation controversy.

The Calon Lân Centre is based at Mynyddbach Chapel, the burial place of Daniel James. The chapel and grounds were at the point of dereliction until 2011 but have been restored.

== Lyrics ==
Nid wy'n gofyn bywyd moethus,
Aur y byd na'i berlau mân:
Gofyn wyf am galon hapus,
Calon onest, calon lân.

Calon lân yn llawn daioni
Tecach yw na'r lili dlos:
Dim ond calon lân all ganu,
Canu'r dydd a chanu'r nos.

Pe dymunwn olud bydol,
Hedyn buan ganddo sydd;
Golud calon lân, rinweddol,
Yn dwyn bythol elw fydd.

Hwyr a bore fy nymuniad
Gwyd i'r nef ar adain cân
Ar i Dduw, er mwyn fy Ngheidwad,
Roddi i mi galon lân.

Translation:

I don't ask for a luxurious life,
The world's gold or its fine pearls:
I ask for a happy heart,
An honest heart, a pure heart.

A pure heart full of goodness
Is fairer than the pretty lily:
None but a pure heart can sing,
Sing in the day and sing in the night.

If I wished for worldly wealth,
It would swiftly go to seed;
The riches of a virtuous, pure heart
Will bear eternal profit.

Evening and morning, my wish
Rising to heaven on the wing of song
For God, for the sake of my Saviour,
To give me a pure heart.

Alternative words in the Welsh version:

- Verse 1, line 3: Gofyn wyf am fywyd hapus
- Verse 2, line 2: Chwim adenydd iddo sydd
- Verse 2, line 2: Adain buan ganddo sydd
- Verse 3, line 2: Esgyn ar adenydd cân
- Chorus, line 3: Does ond calon lân all ganu
