= Bishop Vaughan Catholic School =

Coordinates: 51°39′41″N 3°56′19″W

Bishop Vaughan Catholic Comprehensive School

Location
- Mynydd Garnllwyd Rd; Swansea, SA6 7QG; Wales

Information
- Type: Secondary comprehensive
- Religious affiliation: Catholic
- Established: 1966
- Department for Education URN: 401777 Tables
- Head teacher: E Pole
- Gender: Coeducational
- Age: 11 to 18
- Language: English-medium
- Website: http://www.bishopvaughan.co.uk

Bishop Vaughan Catholic School is a coeducational Catholic secondary school in the Morriston area of Swansea. It is under the remit of the Archdiocese of Cardiff-Menevia.

The school was founded in 1966 by people of Swansea. It comprises a number of buildings: the main teaching block, a four-storey block, craft block, music suite, dining areas and gymnasiums.
