= Mumbles (district) =

District of Swansea, Wales

Coordinates: 51.5730°N 3.9992°W

The Mumbles: Welsh: Y Mwmbwls
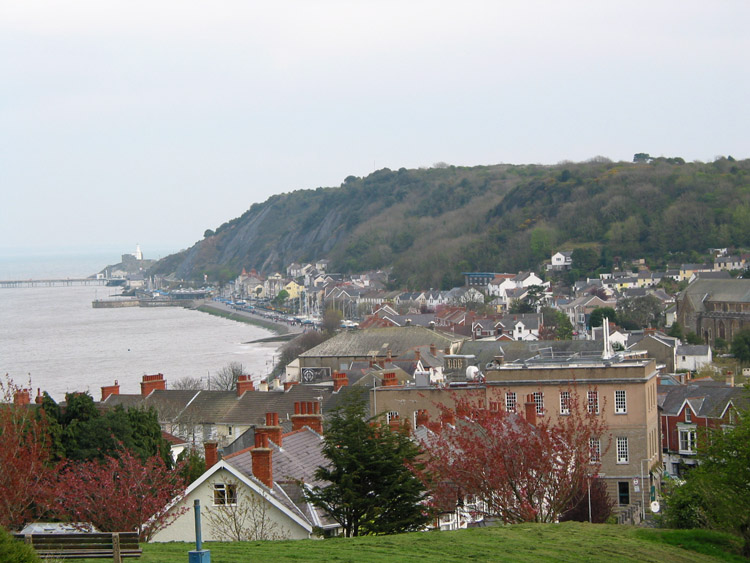
- Mumbles viewed from Oystermouth castle

- Location within Swansea
- Population: 16,600 (2011 census)
- Principal area: Swansea
- Preserved county: West Glamorgan
- Country: Wales
- Sovereign state: United Kingdom
- Post town: SWANSEA
- Postcode district: SA3
- Dialling code: 01792
- Police: South Wales
- Fire: Mid and West Wales
- Ambulance: Welsh
- UK Parliament: Gower
- Senedd Cymru – Welsh Parliament: Gŵyr Abertawe

Mumbles (Welsh: Mwmbwls) is a district of Swansea, Wales, located on the south-east corner of the unitary authority area. It is also a local government community using the same name. At the 2001 census the population was 16,774, reduced slightly to 16,600 at the 2011 Census. The district is named after the headland of Mumbles, located on its south-east corner.

== Etymology ==
The origin of the name "Mumbles" is obscure. Wyn Owen and Morgan (2008) cite several possibilities: Middle English momele ("to mumble"), describing the "mumbling" of the sea next to the rocks; Latin mamillae meaning "breasts", in reference to the breast-shaped silhouette of the islands and headland, and Old Norse múli (snout, promontory).

== History ==
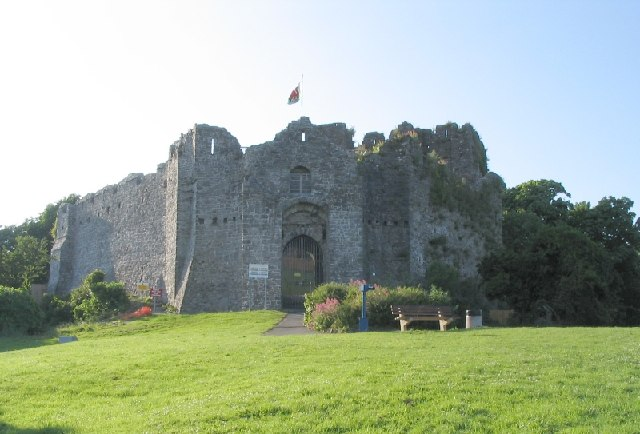
Oystermouth Castle, a venue for open air Shakespearean performances

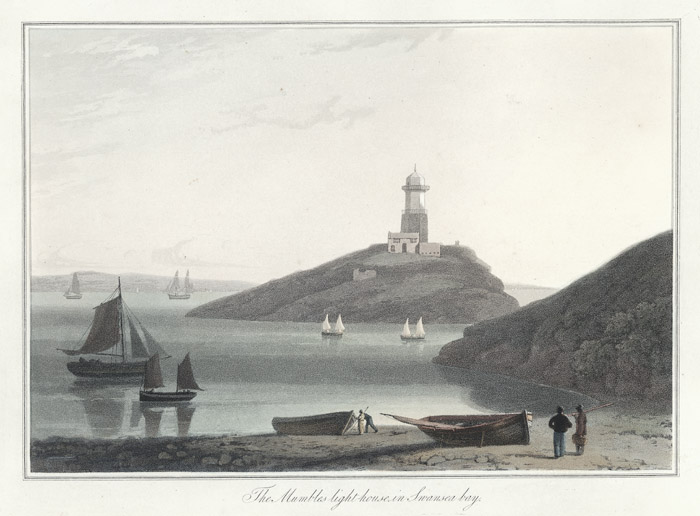
The Mumbles light house 1815

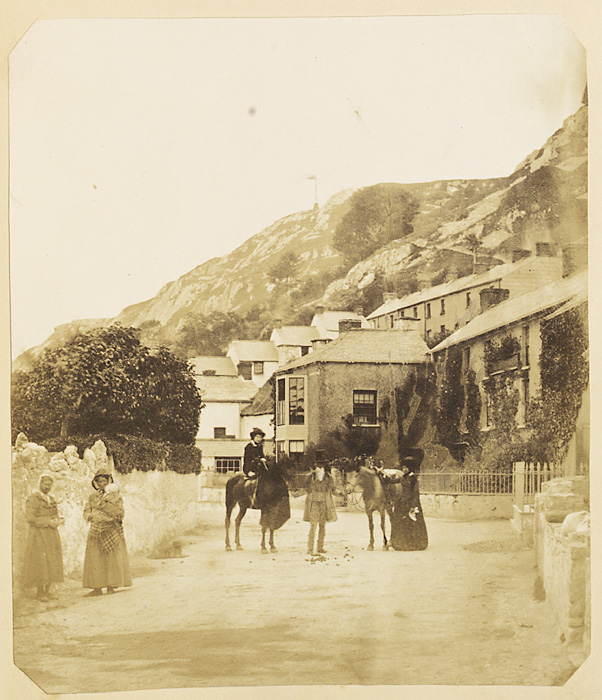
Mumbles, 1850s

Archaeological evidence indicates that an ancient submerged forest was located on what is now the foreshore of Mumbles Bay The bones of bears, wolves, hyenas, deer, rhinoceros and mammoth have been discovered there. A bone cave at the western tip of Caswell Bay was excavated in 1832 but has since been destroyed by the sea. Another cave, at the Inner Sound, Mumbles Head, was blown up by quarrymen in 1838 but not before elephant bones had been found. Also found around the bays of Mumbles and Gower are the bones of sixteen Ice Age mammals, including a mammoth tooth measuring ten centimetres across, which is on display in Swansea Museum.

The first human crop growers arrived in the area over 5,000 years ago. However, there is evidence that human habitation possibly dates as far back as 30,000 years—established by the dating of the famous Red Lady of Paviland skeleton located in a cave some 10–15 miles along the coast from Mumbles Head. The skeleton is kept in the Oxford Museum of Natural History, having been excavated by Rev William Buckland, who was Professor of Geology at Oxford University at the time. However, Swansea Museum has two well-finished flint axe-heads, one from Newton and one from an allotment on Mumbles Hill. Much of what we know about the first metalworkers, in the Bronze Age, has been learned from their tombs: pieces of pottery, a cairn and remains of a hut were found. The cliffs above the Redcliffe flats at Caswell Bay contain the ridged remnants of a Redley Cliff Iron Age hill-fort.

There is evidence that the Romans were based in Mumbles in a villa on the site of the present All Saints Church in Oystermouth. When the site was being extended in 1860, workmen removing a bank of earth on the south side of the original building accidentally broke up a Roman tessellated pavement, or mosaic floor. This was previously a pagan site, as were many sites of worship in the UK which subsequently became places of worship at the onset of Christianity. In this area it has been reported that Romano-British gentlemen of Roman Wales may have eaten oysters from the oysterbeds off the shore below the site at Oystermouth, or Ystumllwynarth. The Norman castle at Oystermouth was built during the first half of the 12th century—one of many castles built in Gower as a defence against the native Welsh princes who sought to reclaim the lands stolen by the Norman invaders. The architectural merits of the church, castle and other buildings in Oystermouth are discussed in J. Newman, The Buildings of Wales: Glamorgan, London, Penguin/University of Wales Press, 1995.

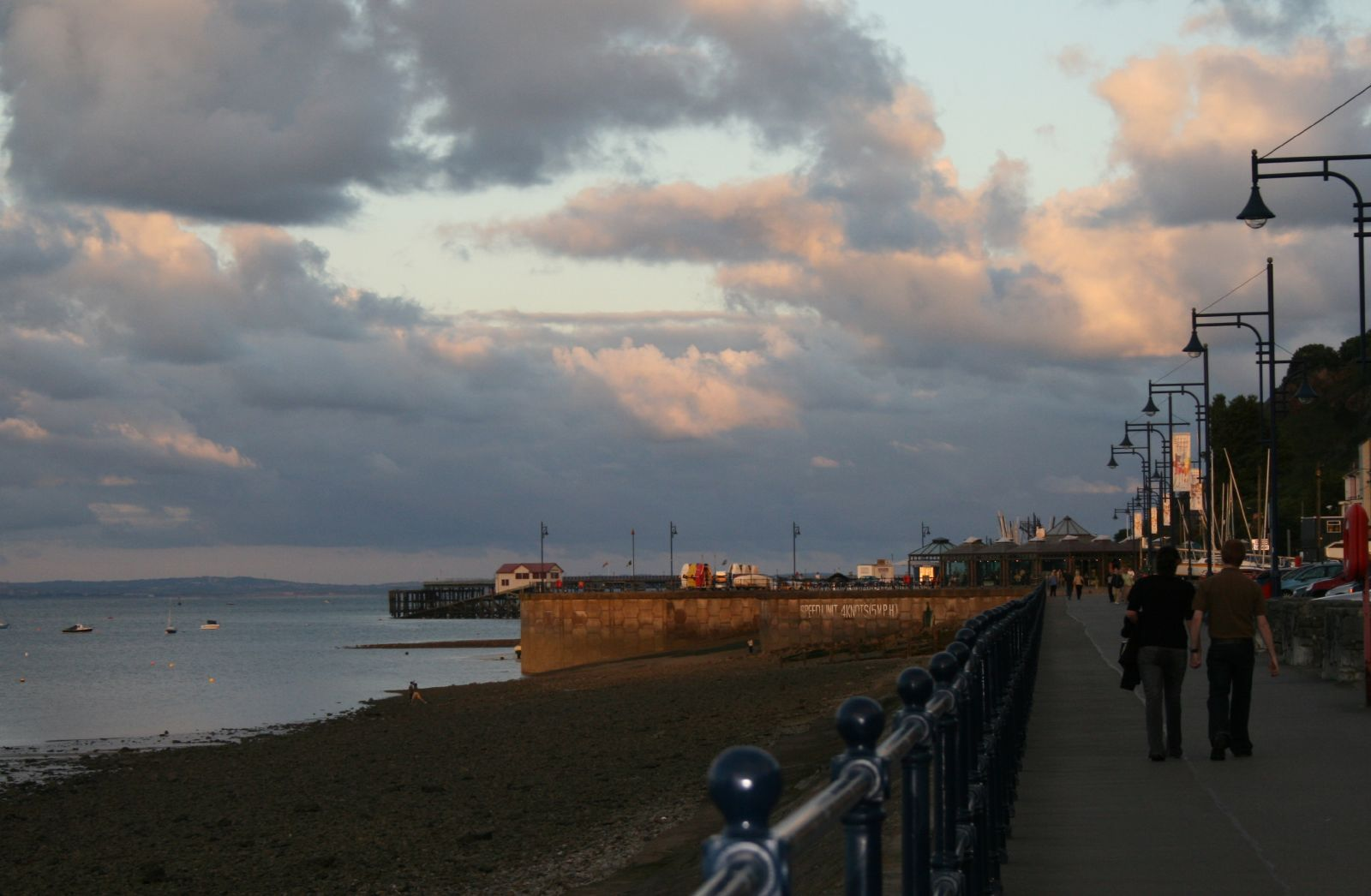
Mumbles seafront

Three of the bells in All Saints Church once belonged to the Jesuit church of La Compañía ("The Company") in Santiago, Chile. They seem to have been brought to Mumbles by Aubrey Vivian after the fire of 1863 burnt down the Jesuit church, killing 2,000 people. The family of industrialist Henry Vivian had business connections with the copper mines of Chile.

In 1793, the Mumbles Lighthouse was erected on the outer of the two tidal islands of Mumbles Head. In 1806, the Oystermouth Railway was built between Oystermouth and Swansea with the intention of carrying coal to Swansea. The potential for carrying passengers was soon seen and a horse-drawn railway passenger service was started on 25 March 1807, making it the first such service in the world. It became enormously popular and was commonly called 'the Mumbles train'. Following the development of the rail service, Mumbles became a popular tourist destination. To capitalise on this, the Mumbles railway was extended and a pier was constructed and opened in 1898 to serve as the new terminus. An RNLI lifeboat slipway was added to the pier in the summer of 1916 and a boathouse was finally built on it in 1922; these remain in use. [Needs updating as there is a new boathouse].

On 23 April 1947, the Mumbles lifeboat lost a crew of eight men while attempting to rescue the crew of the Samtampa that had run aground on Sker Point. The Mumbles railway was closed in January 1960 and dismantled - a controversial decision that still resonates in the locality (calls to "bring back the Mumbles train" are still frequently heard and printed in local newspapers).

Soon after it was built in 1898, the end of the Mumbles Pier became home to bandstand concerts and on the landward side was a winter garden, both of which attracted large crowds. It was advertised by the Swansea and Mumbles Railway as 'the prettiest pier in the Bristol Channel' and the 'Mumbles Press' on 13 April 1911 featured the skating rinks as well as Hanney's select military band. In the 1950s, a large entertainment centre on the end of the pier included dodgem cars, coconut shies and other fairground attractions. Near the bridge to the lifeboat, two amusement kiosks survived from Edwardian days. The landward side of the pier had a café, with a 'penny slot arcade' alongside and a popular dance hall was part of the Pier Hotel. The amusement complex was redeveloped at the landward end of the Mumbles Pier in 1966 and this proved to be a profitable attraction to visitors, resulting in the addition of a new building containing an amusement arcade, restaurant and bowling alley.

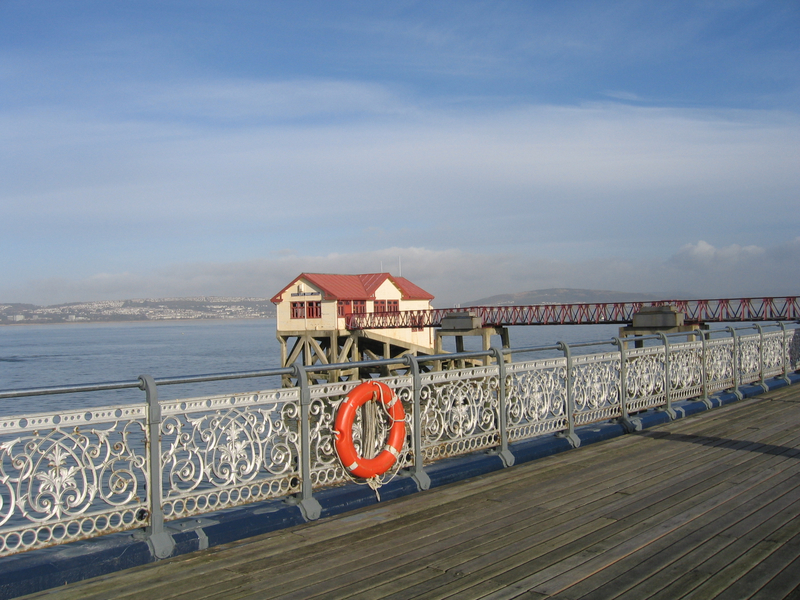
Swansea Lifeboat Station from Mumbles Pier

The 'Mumbles Mile' is a stretch of road in Mumbles once notable for its concentration of pubs. It has long been a popular destination for pub crawls and binge drinking. Famous poet Dylan Thomas was said to have enjoyed many hours at The Mermaid. The 'Mumbles Mile' began to decline in popularity during the 1990s because of pressure from the local council and increased competition from Swansea's night attractions.As of 2025, there are only five pubs on the 'mile', whereas there were once upwards of 20.

The Encyclopaedia of Wales says that Mumbles has always been considered a place apart; as the verse puts it:

Mumbles is a funny place,
A church without a steeple,
Houses made of old ships wrecked
And most peculiar people.

The 2004 mini-series Mine All Mine, starring Griff Rhys Jones, was filmed in Mumbles.

== Climate ==
Climate data for Mumbles Head (1991-2020 normals, extremes 1958-2024)
Month	Jan	Feb	Mar	Apr	May	Jun	Jul	Aug	Sep	Oct	Nov	Dec	Year
Record high °C (°F)	12.7 (54.9)	14.0 (57.2)	19.5 (67.1)	21.8 (71.2)	24.5 (76.1)	29.8 (85.6)	29.2 (84.6)	31.2 (88.2)	25.4 (77.7)	22.4 (72.3)	16.9 (62.4)	14.7 (58.5)	31.2 (88.2)
Mean daily maximum °C (°F)	8.3 (46.9)	8.3 (46.9)	9.8 (49.6)	12.4 (54.3)	15.2 (59.4)	17.8 (64.0)	19.6 (67.3)	19.7 (67.5)	18.0 (64.4)	14.7 (58.5)	11.5 (52.7)	9.1 (48.4)	13.7 (56.7)
Daily mean °C (°F)	6.3 (43.3)	6.2 (43.2)	7.5 (45.5)	9.6 (49.3)	12.4 (54.3)	15.0 (59.0)	16.8 (62.2)	16.9 (62.4)	15.3 (59.5)	12.4 (54.3)	9.4 (48.9)	7.1 (44.8)	11.3 (52.3)
Mean daily minimum °C (°F)	4.3 (39.7)	4.1 (39.4)	5.1 (41.2)	6.9 (44.4)	9.5 (49.1)	12.2 (54.0)	14.1 (57.4)	14.2 (57.6)	12.7 (54.9)	10.1 (50.2)	7.3 (45.1)	5.1 (41.2)	8.8 (47.8)
Record low °C (°F)	−8.6 (16.5)	−6.5 (20.3)	−5.5 (22.1)	−2.2 (28.0)	−0.3 (31.5)	5.2 (41.4)	7.2 (45.0)	5.7 (42.3)	4.6 (40.3)	0.4 (32.7)	−2.9 (26.8)	−4.6 (23.7)	−8.6 (16.5)
Average precipitation mm (inches)	102.5 (4.04)	73.7 (2.90)	69.9 (2.75)	59.9 (2.36)	64.5 (2.54)	68.6 (2.70)	73.6 (2.90)	87.7 (3.45)	76.4 (3.01)	112.8 (4.44)	117.9 (4.64)	114.1 (4.49)	1,021.6 (40.22)
Average precipitation days (≥ 1.0 mm)	15.6	12.1	12.8	10.6	10.4	10.3	10.5	12.0	11.4	14.9	16.0	15.9	152.5
Source 1: Met Office
Source 2: Starlings Roost Weather

== Local government ==
Mumbles was part of Oystermouth Urban District established in 1894, which was merged with the County Borough of Swansea in 1918. The Mumbles is in the Oystermouth electoral ward, while the current Mumbles community also includes the surrounding electoral wards of Mayals, Newton and West Cross.

== Notable people ==
- Thomas Bowdler, who with Henrietta Maria Bowdler edited Shakespeare, is buried in Oystermouth.
- Bishop Graham Charles Chadwick, anti-apartheid campaigner, served in curacy at All Saints Church and is buried in Oystermouth Cemetery.
- Alan Curtis, former Wales international footballer, lives in Mumbles.
- Russell T Davies, screenwriter and television producer, lives in Mumbles.
- Ian Hislop, satirist and editor, was born in Mumbles.
- William Hughes, boxer and child actor (Doctor Who), was born in Mumbles.
- Alun Wyn Jones, captain of the Wales national rugby union team grew up in the area.
- Jean Jenkins, an Australian senator (1987–1990), was brought up in Mumbles.
- Ernest William Jones, cricketer for Glamorgan and Wales and international chartered shipbroker
- Joanna Page, actress, was born in Treboeth Swansea.
- Richard Valentine Pitchford (aka Cardini), Master Magician, was born in Mumbles in 1895.
- Mal Pope, musician and composer, lives in Mumbles.
- Robert Pugh, actor, lives in Mumbles.
- Cara Readle, actress, grew up in Mumbles.
- Andy Secombe, voice actor, actor and novelist, was born in Mumbles.
- Hannah Stone, Royal Harpist, grew up in Mumbles.
- Bonnie Tyler, singer and songwriter, lived in Mumbles.
- Melanie Walters, actress (Gavin & Stacey), lives in Mumbles.
- Geoff Wheel, former Wales international rugby union player, grew up in Mumbles.
- Rowan Williams, Archbishop of Canterbury, was brought up in the area.
- Catherine Zeta-Jones, actress, grew up in Mumbles from the age of 12, and she and Michael Douglas have a house there.

== Settlements ==
The villages in the community are:

- Blackpill
- Mayals
- Langland
- Limeslade
- Newton
- Norton
- Oystermouth
- Thistleboon
- West Cross

== Twinning ==
The Mumbles community is twinned with WebCite query result:

- Kinsale, Ireland
- Hennebont, France
- Havre de Grace, Maryland, United States

== See also ==
- Gower Peninsula
- Swansea and Mumbles Railway
