= Mayals =

Suburb of Swansea, Wales

Coordinates: 51.6047°N 4.0049°W

- Location within Swansea
- Population: 2,600 (Dec 2022)
- OS grid reference: SS6090
- Community: Mumbles
- Principal area: Swansea
- Preserved county: West Glamorgan
- Country: Wales
- Sovereign state: United Kingdom
- Post town: SWANSEA
- Postcode district: SA3
- Dialling code: 01792
- Police: South Wales
- Fire: Mid and West Wales
- Ambulance: Welsh
- UK Parliament: Swansea West
- Senedd Cymru – Welsh Parliament: Swansea West

Mayals is an electoral ward and suburb of Swansea, Wales. It is located about 6 kilometers west of Swansea City Centre. Mayals is considered a part of the larger district of Mumbles, along with the nine other settlements within the community council region. In 2022, Mayals had a population of 2,600, compared with the 2011 census, at which point Mayals had a population of 2,676. Mayals borders the areas of Sketty, Killay, Fairwood, Bishopston, and West Cross. The majority of Mayals is situated within the Gower Area of Outstanding Natural Beauty, which was the first AONB to be established in 1956.

The suburb of Mayals is a mostly residential area, containing Clyne Gardens, Clyne Golf Club, and Mayals Primary School. Clyne Gardens is a 19-hectare botanical garden, which has an 18th-century castle, Clyne Castle, a Japanese-style bridge and adjoining pond, and a large gazebo. The gardens also contain an extensive plant collection, with over 2,000 different plants including over 800 rhododendrons for which the gardens are renowned. Clyne Gardens is popular with local dog owners, with many walking their dogs within the gardens daily.

There is another park within the Mayals area, known locally as West Cross Woodland, despite being situated within the Mayals area. The park is next to Mayals Primary School, and across the street from the West Cross Co-op store, a former pub which was refitted in late 2019. This park contains a small play facility for children, and a small woodland. This park is considerably smaller than Clyne Gardens.

== Education ==
Mayals houses its own primary school, Mayals Primary School, which takes in students aged 4–11, or Nursery, Infants, and Juniors. There are 247 students as of 2022. The school was last inspected by Estyn in 2022, and are currently under review.

Mayals is located within the Bishopston Comprehensive School catchment area. Students within the area are also given the option of post 16 education, with Gower College Swansea being in close proximity, along with Swansea University for undergraduate and postgraduate students.

== Demographics ==
The overall population in the Mayals ward according to the 2011 census was 2,676.

They had the following ethnic breakdown in 2011

Ethnic Group	Count	%
White British	2,440	91.2
White Irish	16	0.6
White Other	53	1.98
Asian British	93	3.5
Black/African/Caribbean/Black British	4	0.1
Mixed ethnicity	43	1.6
Other (e.g. Arab)	27	1.0

== Local Election Results ==
Since 1997 Mayals has been a single-member ward for the purposes of City and County of Swansea Council elections.

=== 2022 ===
Mayals 2022
Party	Candidate	Votes	%	±%
Green	Chris Evans	457	40.4	
Conservative	Louise Thomas	332	29.4	
Labour	Pam Erasmus	280	24.8	
Liberal Democrats	Daniel Guttery	62	5.5	
Green gain from Conservative		Swing		
Turnout		1,138	51.4	–0.9

Chris Evans was the first Green Party candidate to gain a seat in the Swansea Council elections, winning the seat from the Conservatives by 125 votes.

=== 2017 ===
Mayals 2017
Party	Candidate	Votes	%	±%
Conservative	Linda Tyler-Lloyd*	627		
Independent	Helen Mitchell	271		
Labour	Joanne Fitton	207		
Conservative hold		Swing		
Turnout			52.3	+6.2

=== 2012 ===
Mayals 2012
Party	Candidate	Votes	%	±%
Conservative	Linda Tyler-Lloyd	283		
Independent	Peter Geoffrey Birch	264		
Liberal Democrats	Keith Jones	257		
Labour	Peter Rowlands	163		
Independent	David Charles Evans	29		
Conservative hold		Swing		
Turnout			46.1	−8.6

=== 2008 ===
Mayals 2008
Party	Candidate	Votes	%	±%
Conservative	Rene Harwood Kinzett	545		
Independent	Peter Geoffrey Birch	465		
Labour	Juliet Anne Fortey	190		
Conservative gain from Liberal Democrats		Swing		
Turnout			54.7	

Originally elected as a Liberal Democrat in 2004, Rene Harwood Kinzett joined the Conservatives prior to the 2008 election.

=== 2004 ===
Mayals 2004
Party	Candidate	Votes	%	±%
Liberal Democrats	Rene Harwood Kinzett	708		
Conservative	Dorian Gerald Rowbottom	206		
Independent	David Charles Evans*	179		
Labour	Jeffrey William Walton	64		
Plaid Cymru	Eiry Miles	56		
Green	Philip Joel Swinnerton	33		
Liberal Democrats gain from Independent		Swing		

=== 1999 ===
Mayals 1999
Party	Candidate	Votes	%	±%
Independent	David Charles Evans	386		
Conservative	Michael George Shellard	358		
Liberal Democrats	Neil Sinclair Lewis	273		
Labour	David Ian Collins	209		
Independent gain from Liberal Democrats		Swing		

=== 1995 ===
Mayals 1995
Party	Candidate	Votes	%	±%
Liberal Democrats	Beryl Marshall	529		
Conservative	Paul Valerio	260		
Independent	David Charles Evans	219		
Labour	Bob Sykes	172		
Liberal Democrats hold		Swing		
