= Mamie Stuart =

English murder victim (c.1893–1919)

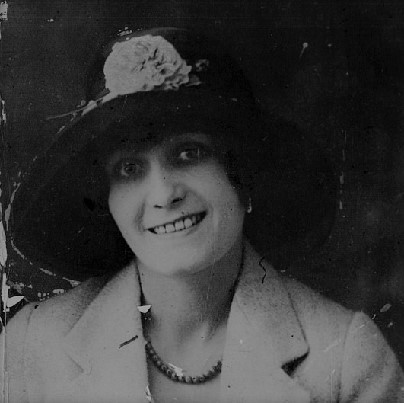
- Stuart c. 1918
- Born: Amy Stuart c. 24 November 1893; Sunderland, England
- Disappeared: November – December 1919; Caswell Bay, Wales
- Died: 12 November – 6 December 1919 (aged 25–26); Caswell Bay, Wales
- Cause of death: Murder. Precise cause unknown. Skull trauma discounted
- Body discovered: 5 November 1961. Brandy Cove, Wales
- Resting place: Bishopwearmouth Cemetery, Sunderland; 54.8999°N 1.4206°W (approximate)
- Occupations: Former chorus girl Typist
- Known for: Victim of murder No body, no murder principle

Mamie Stuart (c. 24 November 1893 – November or December 1919) was a 26-year-old English woman who disappeared from her home in Caswell Bay, Wales, in 1919 and whose disappearance became known via the media as the Chorus Girl Mystery. Her husband, George Everard Shotton—who had bigamously married Stuart in 1918—was considered the prime suspect in her disappearance. Although investigators strongly suspected foul play, as no body could be found, Shotton could not be tried for Stuart's murder. He was instead convicted of bigamy and sentenced to eighteen months' imprisonment.

Stuart's dismembered body was found by three potholers in 1961, stashed behind a slab of rock 50 feet (15 m) inside a narrow, abandoned lead mine on the Gower Peninsula, just 200 yards (180 m) from the home Stuart had resided in at the time of her disappearance. Shotton had died of natural causes in a Fishponds hospital in April 1958. A coroner's court found him guilty of Stuart's murder in December 1961.

The disappearance and eventual discovery of Mamie Stuart was known as the Chorus Girl Mystery due to her background, the duration of time she remained missing, and the unanswered questions behind her ultimate fate.

== Early life ==
Amy Stuart was born in Sunderland in November 1893 to James Stuart, a ship's captain, and his wife Jane (née McGregor). She had one sister, Edith, and a younger brother, James Smith Stuart.

As an adolescent, Stuart developed a passion for dancing. She also developed aspirations to perform in music halls and West End theatres. With her parents' consent, at the age of fifteen Stuart performed as a chorus girl on provincial tours with a troupe named The Magnets. She adopted the name "Mamie", and later left her family home to pursue her career. She later formed her own dance troupe, which she named The Five Verona Girls. This troupe performed nationwide and became a popular attraction, with the dancers—in a prudish era—sometimes daring to expose their legs to knee height.

Stuart was later described by police as being an attractive young woman with brown, bobbed hair and grey-blue eyes, approximately 5 ft 3 in (1.60 m) to 5 ft 4 in (1.63 m) tall, with "very even teeth with one missing" and "of good carriage". As a result of an attack by a dog when she was a child, Stuart had four faint tooth marks on her right cheek, which she concealed with cosmetics.

By early 1917, one member of The Five Verona Girls had become pregnant, while another broke her ankle. Shortly thereafter, the troupe disbanded and Stuart returned to her family home.

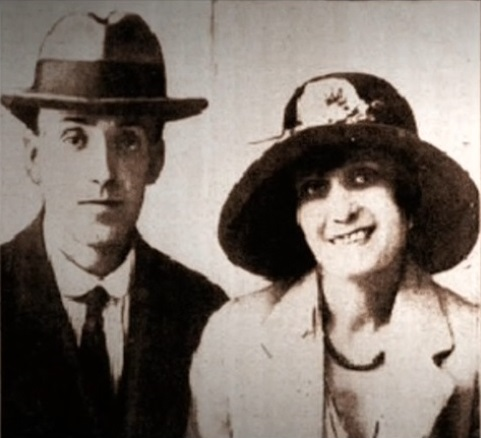
Mamie Stuart and George Shotton, pictured shortly after their March 1918 wedding.

=== Marriage ===
Shortly after the disbandment of The Five Verona Girls, in July 1917, Stuart (then aged 23) became acquainted with a marine engineer named George Shotton in their native Sunderland. Shotton introduced himself to Stuart as a widower, and the two soon began a relationship, with Shotton purchasing a diamond engagement ring for her within months of their acquaintance. Less than a year after their acquaintance, they had married in South Shields. The newlyweds then spent their honeymoon in Droitwich Spa. Shotton and Stuart initially lived in Bristol before relocating to Swansea, residing in a property in Trafalgar Terrace for six months. The two then moved to live in Caswell Bay in the late summer of 1919, residing in a rented remote cottage overlooking Swansea Bay named Ty-Llanwydd. Stuart maintained regular correspondence with her family in Sunderland from this residence.

Unbeknownst to Stuart, Shotton's wife, Mary Shotton (née Leader), whom he had wed in September 1905, was still alive. The couple had a son named Arthur, although their relationship was fraught with violence, with Shotton frequently beating his wife. His wife and child lived in Pennard, with Mary believing her husband's employment was the reason he was frequently absent from the family home for extended periods of time.

== Disappearance ==
Stuart was last seen in November or early December 1919. In letters Stuart had posted in the months prior to her disappearance, she had hinted that her marriage was an unhappy one, increasingly fraught with violence, and of her increasing desire to leave Shotton, who refused to allow her to return to the stage. The final correspondence she is known to have penned to her parents from Ty-Llanwydd was dated 12 November. Shortly thereafter, her parents posted a reply, although this letter was returned to them marked 'House Closed'. Convinced an error had been made by the post office, the Stuarts posted a reply-paid telegram to their daughter, although this letter was also returned with the same marking.

Shortly before Christmas 1919, a telegram was sent to Stuart's parents—apparently from their daughter—wishing them "compliments of the season". No further correspondence from Stuart or her husband was received by her parents.

=== Investigation ===
In March 1920, staff at Swansea's Grosvenor Hotel noted a leather trunk left by a male guest the previous December had remained unclaimed for approximately three months. As there was no address tag on the exterior of the trunk, the manager of the hotel contacted police, who opened the trunk to discover two women's dresses and a pair of shoes, all extensively cut and torn. Also discovered inside the trunk were items of jewellery, a Bible, a rosary, and a manicure set.

A scrap of paper was also discovered within the trunk. This bore the address of Stuart's parents, who informed investigators their daughter was missing, and that they had been attempting to locate her for several months. Both feared for her safety, and handed police several letters they had received from their daughter the previous year revealing her increasing unhappiness regarding her husband and her fear for her own wellbeing. The Stuarts had also recently obtained a letter their daughter had penned weeks before her disappearance in which she had written: "If you don't hear from me, please wire to Mrs. Hearn [a friend] and see if she knows anything about me. The man is not all there. I don't think I will live with him much longer. My life is not worth living." Investigators also discovered that in letters to her parents, Stuart had indicated her abuse at Shotton's hands, of her desire to cease living with him, and of her knowledge there was something "odd" about him.

Shortly thereafter, a maid cleaning the couple's deserted cottage in preparation for the accommodation of new tenants recovered Stuart's mildewed brown leather handbag concealed behind a dresser in an upstairs bedroom. This handbag still contained two pounds in loose change and Stuart's sugar ration card.

=== Scotland Yard ===
By the spring of 1920, South Wales Police were convinced Stuart had been murdered, that she had died at the hands of Shotton, and that the most likely motive for her murder had been either rage, control, jealousy, or a mixture of the three. Scotland Yard was contacted, and Chief Inspector William Draper dispatched to oversee the investigation. Draper ordered a thorough search of Ty-Llanwydd, the grounds of the property, and the surrounding terrain, although no trace of Stuart was found. A nationwide search for Stuart was ordered, with her description circulated throughout Britain. This tactic also yielded no successful leads.

=== Prime suspect ===
The chief suspect of both South Wales Police and Scotland Yard was Stuart's husband, George Shotton. Draper quickly located Shotton, who was living in Pennard with his wife and child, barely two miles from Ty-Llanwydd. Shotton admitted to knowing Stuart and to leaving the trunk at the Swansea hotel, which he claimed he had done shortly after she had left him following an argument early the previous December. This argument, he claimed, was caused by her infidelity. He denied having married Stuart, or any knowledge of her current whereabouts.

Despite Shotton's claims to the contrary, investigations quickly revealed he had bigamously married Stuart almost two years earlier, although he denied doing so and said that when she walked out on him, he had simply chosen to go back to his wife. Scotland Yard also contacted Stuart's friend Mrs. Hearn, who confirmed Stuart had suffered domestic abuse at Shotton's hands and had once begged her: "If I am ever missing, do your utmost to find me, won't you?"

As police could not find Stuart's body, they were unable to charge Shotton with her murder, as the law at the time prevented a suspect being tried for murder if there was no body. Convinced of—but unable to prove—Shotton's guilt, by the mid-1920s, investigators at Scotland Yard began referring to this case as the "perfect crime".

=== Bigamy charge ===
Investigators had discovered early in their investigation that Shotton had bigamously married Stuart in South Shields on 25 March 1918. This bigamy charge proved to be the only they could charge him with. He was arrested on 29 May 1920 for this offence and brought to trial two months later at Glamorgan Assizes, pleading not guilty and claiming that although he had known and lived with Stuart, someone had assumed his identity to marry her. He also denied mistreating her, and repeated his claim the two had parted company following a quarrel in early December. Several individuals testified at trial that the two were indeed married and, initially, their matrimony had been harmonious. One individual to testify was Stuart's sister, Edith, who testified that Shotton had frequently referred to Stuart as "my own little wife" and had typically signed his letters with the words "Your own loving husband".

At this bigamy trial, the prosecuting counsel, Sir Ellis Griffith KC, openly accused Shotton of "doing away with" Stuart, but in the absence of her body, nothing could be proven. On 13 July, Shotton was sentenced to serve eighteen months' imprisonment with hard labour for bigamously marrying Stuart. Shortly after he was released from jail, his legal wife divorced him.

The 10 February 1923 front page of the Daily Mirror, describing the manhunt to locate Mamie Stuart.

== Intervening years ==
=== Sightings ===
In the years following Shotton's bigamy conviction, numerous alleged sightings of Stuart were reported as far afield as Canada, South Africa, Australia and India. Many of these sightings received extensive press coverage. One early reported sighting of Stuart was made by the chief officer of the cargo ship Blythmoor, Thomas James, who was a close friend of her father. He claimed to have seen Stuart in the portal town of Karachi in the early 1920s, and that she was part of a troupe of English travelling artists performing at a Karachi theatre. When approached by James, however, the woman had denied she was Stuart and quickly walked away. However, James was adamant the woman he had spoken to was Stuart.

=== Drainage pit discovery ===
In 1950, a dentist purchased the remote cottage Shotton and Stuart had resided in at the time of her disappearance. Performing drainage work around the property, this individual discovered a pit at the rear of the house, close to a hole in the foundation which reached beneath the floorboards of the dining room. This pit had been filled with quicklime, although all that was recovered from the pit was one lady's shoe.

=== George Shotton ===
After Shotton was released from prison in early 1922, he moved to Tintern, where he ran a smallholding. He was a regular churchgoer, and remembered in the village as "a charming chap" who "practically [ran] the tennis club". After several years living in the village, Shotton abruptly left, possibly due to a local newspaper having revived the story of Stuart's disappearance and his suspected culpability. He then relocated to Balham, South London, to live with his elderly mother, Louisa, taking a series of jobs including being an odd job man and a motor mechanic.

In May 1938, Shotton was arrested for threatening his sister, Gladys Austin, with a revolver at her Fareham home. He was also charged with causing actual bodily harm to her. This incident stemmed from resentment between the siblings regarding their respective bequeathments in their mother's will. He was sentenced to serve twelve months in jail with hard labour. Following his release, Shotton severed all contact with his family and friends and moved to Ledbury, where he worked at an aircraft factory. He later relocated to Bristol.

== Discovery ==
Forty-two years after Stuart's disappearance, on 5 November 1961, three young potholers named Graham Jones, John Gerke and Chris MacNamara discovered her remains in a rotting sack hidden behind a large stone slab 50 feet down a disused lead mine at Brandy Cove in Caswell. Her body had been concealed just 200 yards from the home she and Shotton had resided in at the time of her disappearance.

One of the potholers, John Gerke, would later state that he and his friends had chosen to explore this area as it had formerly been used by smugglers and that as the trio attempted to explore a ventilation shaft, their route through a narrow tunnel approximately ten feet in length was blocked by a large stone slab. Pulling this slab aside, Gerke observed a skull, which he turned to face him, and realised it was human. Nearby lay a black celluloid hair clasp still containing a tuft of mid-brown hair, items of jewellery including a seven-inch brass chain, and several scraps of clothing.

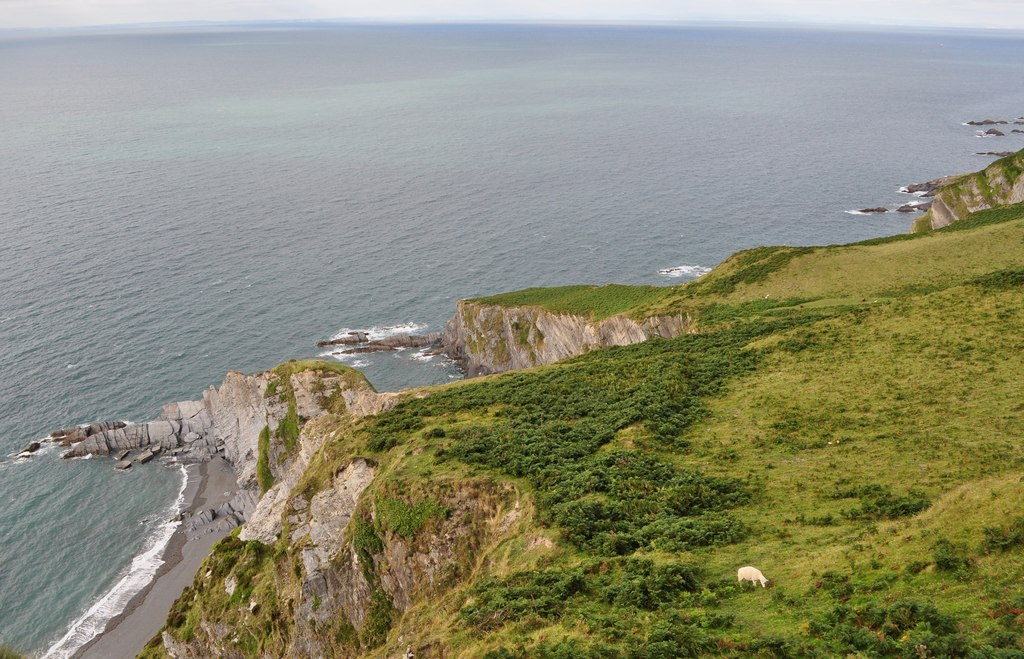
Brandy Cove, Gower Peninsula. Mamie Stewart's body was discovered in a mine shaft at this location in 1961.

=== Forensic examination ===
The remains were taken to the Forensic Science Laboratory in Cardiff, where a forensic examination of the remains was conducted by two Home Office pathologists named William James and John Griffiths. The bones were reassembled into a complete skeleton—minus the rib cage—belonging to a female between 5 ft 3in and 5 ft 4in tall, and with one canine tooth extracted from the upper jaw. Three of her wisdom teeth were present, suggesting she was over twenty years of age. An X-ray study of the growth areas of her bones revealed the decedent was a fully mature woman, but that complete maturation had only recently occurred, suggesting she was aged in her mid-twenties. As two bones at the base of her skull had recently fused, the decedent was unlikely to have been over twenty-eight years of age.

Sections of the skeleton bore green staining due to copper contamination from the brass jewellery recovered with her remains. No precise cause of death could be determined, although the pathologists were unable to discount strangulation or stabbing.

The physical description of the remains and the location of their recovery matched the contemporaneous description of Stuart. Although the remains were completely skeletonized, the scraps of clothing and footwear and the jewellery found alongside the remains indicated when she had most likely died. The National Museum of Wales confirmed that the gilt-copper stole tassels worn by the decedent were most fashionable around the year 1920; the most recent year of manufacture of the gold wedding ring and diamond engagement ring also found had been 1912 and 1918, indicating that death had most likely occurred in the years immediately after World War I. An elderly lady who had been a close friend of Stuart identified both rings as belonging to the missing woman. (Note: At the subsequent inquest into Stuart's death, twenty witnesses, including her relatives, testified that the rings found in the mine had belonged to her.)

=== Shotton ===
With the assistance of Interpol, police again began their efforts to locate George Shotton, with Scotland Yard assigning nine men full-time to this task. Three weeks later, he was located—in Bristol's Arnos Vale Cemetery, having died of natural causes just three years previously on 30 April 1958, at the age of 77. He had died penniless, and had lived his final years in a home for elderly people before suffering a stroke and dying in Bristol's Southmead Hospital. Shortly after his death, Shotton had been buried in an unmarked pauper's grave simply bearing his welfare number.

Shotton's first wife was still alive. When questioned in 1961, she confirmed that her former husband possessed a violent temper, and that his violent temper, his adultery, and her conviction of his guilt in Stuart's murder while she had remained missing had been the reasons she had divorced him. She further stated she had seldom seen Shotton following their divorce, and that he had never confessed his guilt to her.

== Inquest ==
The formal inquest into Stuart's death was held on 14 December 1961. Throughout the duration of the proceedings, her skeleton was laid on a table in the well of the courtroom.

Forensic testimony revealed the body had been severed at three equal lengths: one cut had been made at the lower femur just above the knees; a second horizontal cut had been made through both humerus bones at mid-section, with the instrument used to dissect her body also severing the lower shoulder blades and her spine. Evidently, Stuart's murderer had had difficulty dismembering her body, as several bones bore striations and indentations indicating her murderer had made several unsuccessful efforts to dissect her before severing her bones. No bones from Stuart's rib cage were recovered at the scene of her discovery. (Note: Pathologist Bernard Knight, who had direct knowledge of the case and had extensively examined the remains, wrote in New Scientist in 1996 that her skeleton had in fact been sawn into 6 parts.)

To assist in the formal identification, forensic experts superimposed a photograph of the skull that had been discovered over a smiling, life-sized portrait of Stuart taken in her performing days in order to aid the identification. The coroner, D. R. James, testified that although he was able to discount any form of skull trauma as being the cause of Stuart's death, as no soft tissue remained, he was unable to pinpoint the cause of her death. Stating his conviction that Stuart's death was murder, James then asked the coroner's jury the question: "Can you imagine any reason for sawing up anyone if the person had committed suicide or if the death was accidental?"

Towards the end of the inquest, an 83-year-old retired postman named William Symons informed the coroner that in December 1919, as he had been delivering mail to Ty-Llanwydd, he had observed Shotton struggling to put a large sack into the back of a small yellow van parked outside the front gate of the couple's cottage. According to Symons, as he offered to help Shotton with the heavy load, he had looked up and observed his blue uniform before replying: "No! No! No! Oh god, you gave me a fright! For a minute I thought you were a policeman." He had then observed Shotton place the load into the van and drive in the direction of Brandy Cove. (Note: Symons had not informed investigators of this incident during their initial search for Stuart in 1920. He would testify at the inquest that his reason for not doing so was that he had not seen any significance in the incident.)

=== Conclusions ===
On 15 December, the inquest into Mamie Stuart's death concluded that the remains were indeed hers, and that she had been murdered, although the precise cause of death could not be determined. Furthermore, the inquest concluded she had been murdered between 12 November and 6 December 1919, and that the now-deceased George Shotton was responsible for her murder. (Note: In 1961, a coroner's court could publicly name a murderer, although doing so was subsequently disallowed by the Criminal Law Act 1977.)

== Burial ==
At the conclusion of the 1961 inquest, Stuart's skeleton was retained at Cardiff University, where eminent forensic pathologist Bernard Knight is believed to have occasionally used it to teach students. No efforts were made to locate surviving relatives and return her body to her family.

Stuart's great niece Susan Oldnall only discovered the whereabouts of her great aunt's remains in 2019 when she was approached by researchers for a programme on the CBS Reality channel focusing upon unsolved murders. Oldnall then discovered her great aunt's remains were being stored in a cupboard inside a Cardiff forensic laboratory. The senior forensic pathologist at the laboratory, Dr. Stephen Leadbeatter, had retained the remains—despite being urged to dispose of them—in the hope a surviving member of Stuart's family might reclaim them. Upon learning of Oldnall's whereabouts and wishes, Leadbeatter personally took Stuart's remains to Oldnall in order that they may be interred by her family.

Stuart's body was buried in Bishopwearmouth Cemetery in Sunderland in December 2019. She was buried in a grave alongside her parents. Four of Stuart's descendants attended the service. Shortly thereafter, Mrs Oldnall commented to the BBC: "She's been treated with such lack of dignity, and now she's with her parents. I'm not religious, but I do feel much better about it now ... I only did what a lot of people would have done and I hope, if there is a heaven, that the family are all finally having a good time together."

== Media ==
=== Television ===
- ITV Cymru broadcast a documentary focusing upon the murder of Mamie Stuart as part of their documentary series Crime Files. Presented by Andrea Byrne, this documentary was first broadcast in September 2016.
- The BBC One documentary television series Dark Land: Hunting the Killers broadcast a fifty-minute documentary focusing upon the murder of Mamie Stuart. Directed by David Howard, this documentary, titled Mamie Stuart and George Shotton, was initially broadcast in November 2020.
- CBS Reality commissioned a sixty-minute documentary focusing upon the murder of Mamie Stuart as part of their documentary series Murder by the Sea. Presented by Geoffrey Wansell, this episode was first broadcast on 7 May 2019.

=== Literature ===
- Hinton, Bob (2012), South Wales Murders, Gloucestershire: History Press Limited ISBN 978-0-752-48389-4
- Evans, Colin (1996), The Casebook of Forensic Detection: How Science Solved 100 of the World's Most Baffling Crimes, Canada: John Wiley & Sons, Inc. ISBN 978-0-471-07650-6
- Ubelaker, Douglas H.; Scamell, Henry (1992), Bones: A Forensic Detective's Casebook, New York: M. Evans and Company Inc., ISBN 978-1-283-61515-0
- Wilson, Colin (1995), Written in Blood: A History of Forensic Detection, Glasgow: HarperCollins, ISBN 978-0-58620-842-7

== See also ==
- Capital punishment in the United Kingdom
- Domestic violence
- List of solved missing person cases (pre-1950)
- Murder conviction without a body

== Cited works and further reading ==
- Brookes, Geoff (2013), Swansea Murders, Gloucestershire: History Press Limited, ISBN 978-0-752-49307-7
- Gaute, J. H. H. (1991), The New Murderers' Who's Who, New York: Dorset Press, ISBN 978-0-747-23270-4
- Hinton, Bob (2012), South Wales Murders, Gloucestershire: History Press Limited, ISBN 978-0-752-48389-4
- Houck, Max M. (2016), Forensic Anthropology, London: Elsevier Publishing, ISBN 978-0-128-02523-9
- Innes, Brian (2000), Bodies of Evidence, London: Amber Books Ltd, ISBN 978-1-856-05623-6
- Lane, Brian; Innes, Brian (1992). "The Chorus Girl Mystery". Real-Life Crimes (7). London, England: Eaglemoss Publications Ltd: 154–158. ISBN 978-1-856-29736-3.
- Latham, Krista E.; Bartelink, Eric J.; Finnegan, Michael (2017), New Perspectives in Forensic Human Skeletal Identification, San Diego: Academic Press, ISBN 978-0-128-05429-1
- Morris, Jim (2015), The Who's Who of British Crime: In the Twentieth Century, Stroud: Amberley Publishing, ISBN 978-1-445-63924-6
- Nash, Robert J. (1989), Encyclopedia of World Crime: S-Z, Michigan: CrimeBooks, ISBN 978-0-923-58200-5
- Pickering, Robert B. (2009), The Use of Forensic Anthropology, New York: Taylor & Francis Group, ISBN 978-1-420-06877-1
- Tilstone, William; Savage, Kathleen; Clark, Leigh (2006), Forensic Science: An Encyclopedia of History, Methods, and Techniques, Santa Barbara: ABC-CLIO, ISBN 978-1-576-07194-6
- Tippings, Lisa, (2019), Secret Swansea, Stroud, Amberley Publishing, ISBN 978-1-445-68867-1
- Ubelaker, Douglas H.; Scamell, Henry (1992), Bones: A Forensic Detective's Casebook, New York: M. Evans and Company Inc., ISBN 978-1-283-61515-0
- Wilson, Colin (1995), Written in Blood: A History of Forensic Detection, Glasgow: HarperCollins, ISBN 978-0-58620-842-7
