= Mumbles (disambiguation) =

Mumbles is a headland in Swansea, Wales, United Kingdom.

Mumbles may also refer to:

== Places ==
- Mumbles (community), the local government community covering Mumbles, Swansea
- Mumbles (district), the area covering Mumbles, Swansea
- Mumbles, an electoral ward to the City and County of Swansea Council

== Other uses ==
- Mumbles RFC, a rugby football club based in Mumbles, Swansea
- Mumbles, a Dick Tracy character
- "Mumbles", a 1960s jazz hit by Clark Terry
- Thomas Menino, American politician known as "Mumbles"

== See also ==
- Mumble (disambiguation)
