= Bishopston (Swansea ward) =

Electoral ward in Swansea, Wales

Coordinates: 51.61958°N 3.95142°W

Bishopston ward
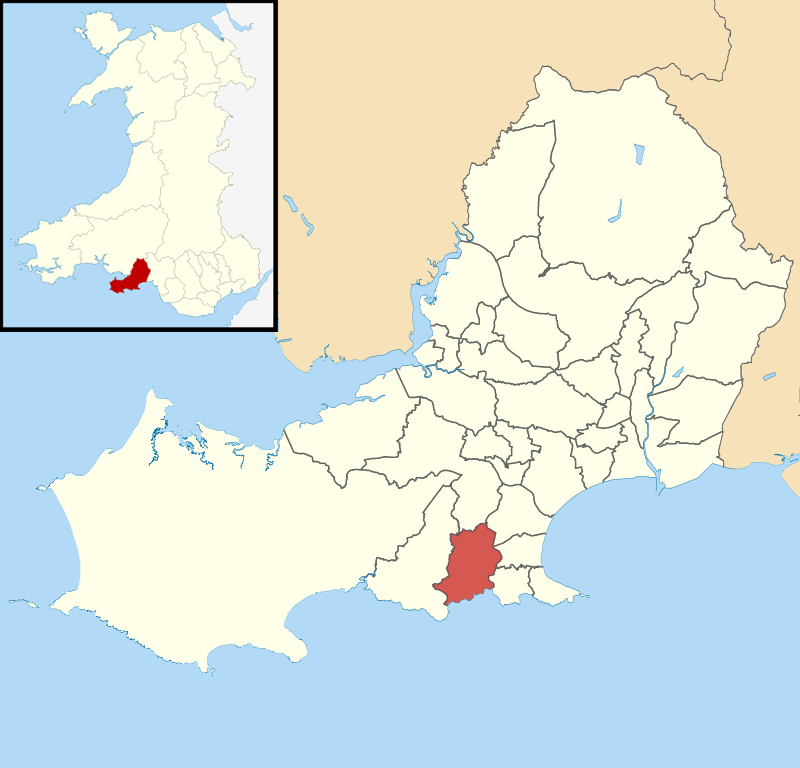
- Bishopston ward location within the City and County of Swansea
- Area: 5.89 km^{2} (2.27 sq mi)
- Population: 3,251 (2011 census)
  - Density: 552/km^{2} (1,430/sq mi)
- Principal area: Swansea
- Preserved county: West Glamorgan
- Country: Wales
- Sovereign state: United Kingdom
- UK Parliament: Gower
- Senedd Cymru – Welsh Parliament: Gŵyr Abertawe
- Councillors: Keith Marsh (Independent)

Oldway, Bishopston

Bishopston (Welsh: Llandeilo Ferwallt) is an electoral ward in the City and County of Swansea, Wales. Most of the area is rural consisting of farmland and small villages. The ward is named after the village (and coterminous community) of Bishopston which falls within the ward.

The electoral ward consists of some or all of the following areas: Barland Common, Caswell, Clyne Common, Bishopston, Manselfield, Murton, Oldway, in the parliamentary constituency of Gower. It is bounded by the Bristol Channel to the south; and the wards of: Pennard to the west; Fairwood to the north; and Mayals, West Cross, and Newton to the east.

== Current Representation ==
The Bishopston Ward is a single-member ward for the purposes of City and County of Swansea Council elections. Following the 2017 election, it is currently represented by Conservative councillor Lyndon Richard Jones who defeated long-serving Independent Keith Marsh.

=== Bishopston (one seat) ===
Bishopston 2017
Party	Candidate	Votes	%	±%
Conservative	Lyndon Richard Jones	620		
Independent	Keith Edmund Marsh*	440		
Labour	Adam Owen Gilbert	397		
Green	Karen Laurence	63		
Majority				
Turnout			56.8	+16.7
Conservative gain from Independent		Swing		

== Recent history ==
The first election to the new unitary City and County of Swansea Council took place in 1995. The seat was won by the Liberal Democrats.

Bishopston 1995
Party	Candidate	Votes	%	±%
Liberal Democrats	F.T. Hughes*	641		
Independent	Keith Marsh	582		
Labour	C.E. Lowit	164		
Liberal Democrats win (new seat)				

In 1999, the seat was won by an Independent who was returned unopposed.

Bishopston 1999
Party	Candidate	Votes	%	±%
Independent	Keith Marsh	Unopposed		
Independent gain from Liberal Democrats		Swing		

Keith Marsh comfortably held the seat in 2004

Bishopston 2004
Party	Candidate	Votes	%	±%
Independent	Keith Marsh*	1,029		
Liberal Democrats	John Bleay	168		
Green	Larch Maxey	143		
Independent hold		Swing		

In 2008, Keith Marsh was again returned but with a reduced majority.

Bishopston 2008
Party	Candidate	Votes	%	±%
Independent	Keith Marsh *	730		
Conservative	Carole Hyde	516		
Green	Rashid Malik	110		
Independent hold		Swing		
Turnout			49.7	

Keith Marsh was returned for a fourth time at the 2012 election.

Bishopston 2012
Party	Candidate	Votes	%	±%
Independent	Keith Marsh *	645		
Conservative	Gareth Davies	267		
Labour	David Dorsett	175		
Majority				
Turnout			40.1	−9.6
Independent hold		Swing		
