= William Hughes (boxer and actor) =

Welsh boxer and child actor (1998–2018)

- Hughes (left) landing a blow in February 2018
- Born: 12 May 1998; Swansea, Wales
- Died: 9 July 2018 (aged 20); Corfu, Greece
- Education: Queen Mary University of London

William Hughes (12 May 1998 – 9 July 2018) was a Welsh boxer and child actor from Mumbles, Swansea.

== Acting ==
As a child, Hughes appeared in several episodes of the television programme Doctor Who as the boyhood incarnation of the Doctor's greatest rival, the Master, a character he portrayed simultaneously alongside John Simm. He appeared in the episodes The Sound of Drums and Last of the Time Lords in 2007, with archive footage being used to incorporate him into The End of Time in 2009–2010. Hughes is currently the youngest actor to have portrayed the Master.

He also appeared in the spin-off Torchwood in 2008, as a different character called Alex Grainger in the episode "Sleeper".

== Boxing ==
Hughes began boxing at age 9 in Bon-y-maen, at the ABC Boxing gym and won three Welsh titles. He became the protege of Enzo Maccarinelli, the Welsh World Champion boxer, and won a British Championship at the GB Amateur Boxing Championships in 2011 for Wales, in the 42 kg class. He continued with the sport, and in early 2017 he fought in a charity white-collar boxing exhibition match, raising money for cancer research, working with sports company Ultra White Collar Boxing. From autumn 2017, he joined the Elite Athlete Programme at Queen Mary University of London, also studying a degree in Finance there. In 2018, he also fought with the club Repton. With Queen Mary's, he won Gold at the 2017/18 British Universities and Colleges Sport championships. He shares a name with the 1930s Welsh champion boxer William, or Billy, "Kid" Hughes.

== Death ==
In July 2018, Hughes took a trip to the Greek island of Corfu to celebrate finishing his exams from his first year of studies at Queen Mary's. On 9 July – the last night of his holiday – Hughes was found unresponsive. He was transferred to hospital but could not be resuscitated. Following an inquest, which concluded the 20-year-old had died by suicide, his body was flown back to the UK.

His former school in Swansea, Bishop Vaughan Catholic School, released a statement sending their thoughts and prayers to his family and saying that he was "an exceptionally talented sportsman" during his time there. His coach and friend, Enzo Maccarinelli, posted a tweet and released statements calling his "little protege" "a tremendously talented kid" with "dreams of competing as a professional [boxer]" and "everything going for him", and saying that he was "heartbroken".

== Filmography ==
Year	Title	Role	Notes
2007, 2009–2010	Doctor Who	The Master (age 8)	3 episodes
2008	Torchwood	Alex Grainger	Episode: "Sleeper"
2010	Doctor Who	Child museum visitor	Episode "Vincent and the Doctor"; uncredited
