= Mayals (electoral ward) =

Electoral ward in Swansea, Wales

Coordinates: 51.59165°N 4.00797°W

Mayals Ward
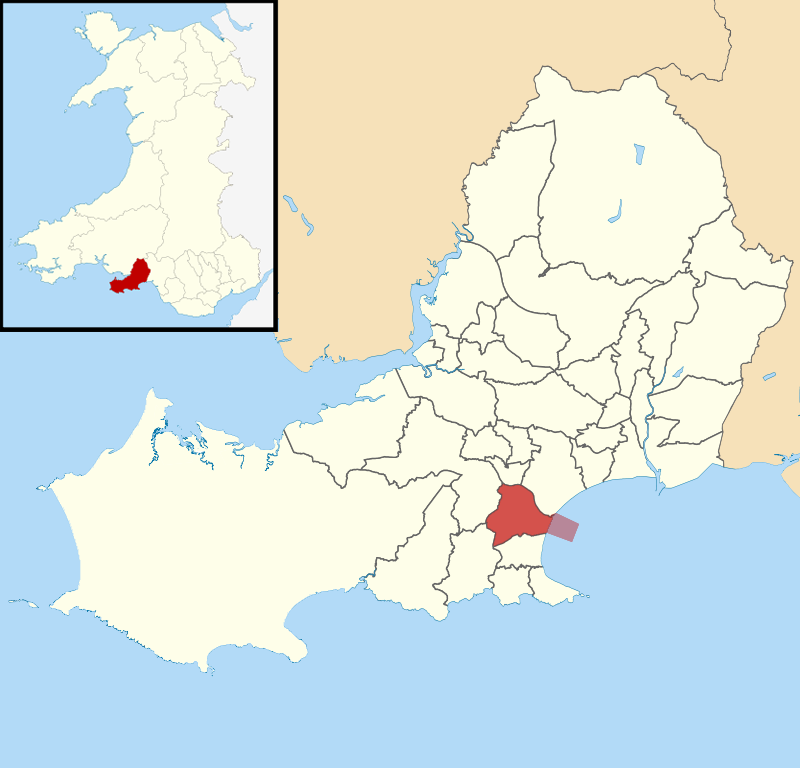
- Location of Mayals ward within the City and County of Swansea
- Area: 4.52 km^{2} (1.75 sq mi)
- Population: 2,676 (2011 census)
  - Density: 592/km^{2} (1,530/sq mi)
- Principal area: Swansea
- Preserved county: West Glamorgan
- Country: Wales
- Sovereign state: United Kingdom
- UK Parliament: Swansea West
- Senedd Cymru – Welsh Parliament: Gŵyr Abertawe
- Councillors: Chris Evans (Wales Green Party)

Mayals is an electoral ward of the City and County of Swansea, Wales, UK. It is also part of the Mumbles Community.

The electoral ward consists of some or all of the following geographical areas: Blackpill, Mayals and part of West Cross, in the parliamentary constituency of Swansea West. It is bounded by the wards of Sketty and Killay South to the north; Swansea Bay to the east; West Cross to the south; and Bishopston and Fairwood to the west.

== 2022 local council elections ==
At the 2022 Swansea Council elections on 5 May 2022, Swansea gained its first ever Green Party councillor, with Chris Evans winning the Mayals seat from the Conservatives by 125 votes.

== 2012 local council elections ==
In the local council elections for 2012, the turnout in the Mayals was 46.05%. The results were:

Candidate	Party	Votes	Status
Linda Tyler-Lloyd	Welsh Conservatives	283	Welsh Conservatives hold
Peter Geoffrey Birch	Independents@Swansea	264	
Keith Jones	Liberal Democrats	257	
Peter Rowlands	Labour	163	
David Charles Evans	Independent	29	
