= Newton, Swansea =

Coordinates: 51.57343°N 4.02160°W

Newton Ward
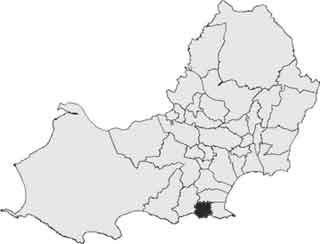
- Area: 2.36 km^{2} (0.91 sq mi)
- Population: 3,316 (2011 census)
  - Density: 1,405/km^{2} (3,640/sq mi)
- Principal area: Swansea
- Preserved county: West Glamorgan
- Country: Wales
- Sovereign state: United Kingdom
- UK Parliament: Gower
- Senedd Cymru – Welsh Parliament: Gŵyr Abertawe

Newton is a village (and former electoral ward) in the city of and County of Swansea, Wales. The village is located near the Mumbles just inland and uphill from Swansea Bay. The Newton ward was a part of the Mumbles community.

The sandy beaches of Langland Bay and Caswell Bay are located to the far south of the area.

== Governance ==
The Newton electoral ward consisted of the Caswell, Langland and Newton localities in the parliamentary constituency of Gower. The ward was bounded by the wards of Bishopston to the west; West Cross to the north; Oystermouth to the east; and the Bristol Channel to the south. Total population at the 2001 census was 3,150 of whom 73.7% were born in Wales.

The ward was represented by Councillor William Thomas of the Conservatives between May 2017 and May 2022.

Following a ward boundary review, the Oystermouth and Newton wards were combined to create a new ward of Mumbles, represented by three county councillors.
