= Mumbles (community) =

Community in Swansea, Wales

- Community
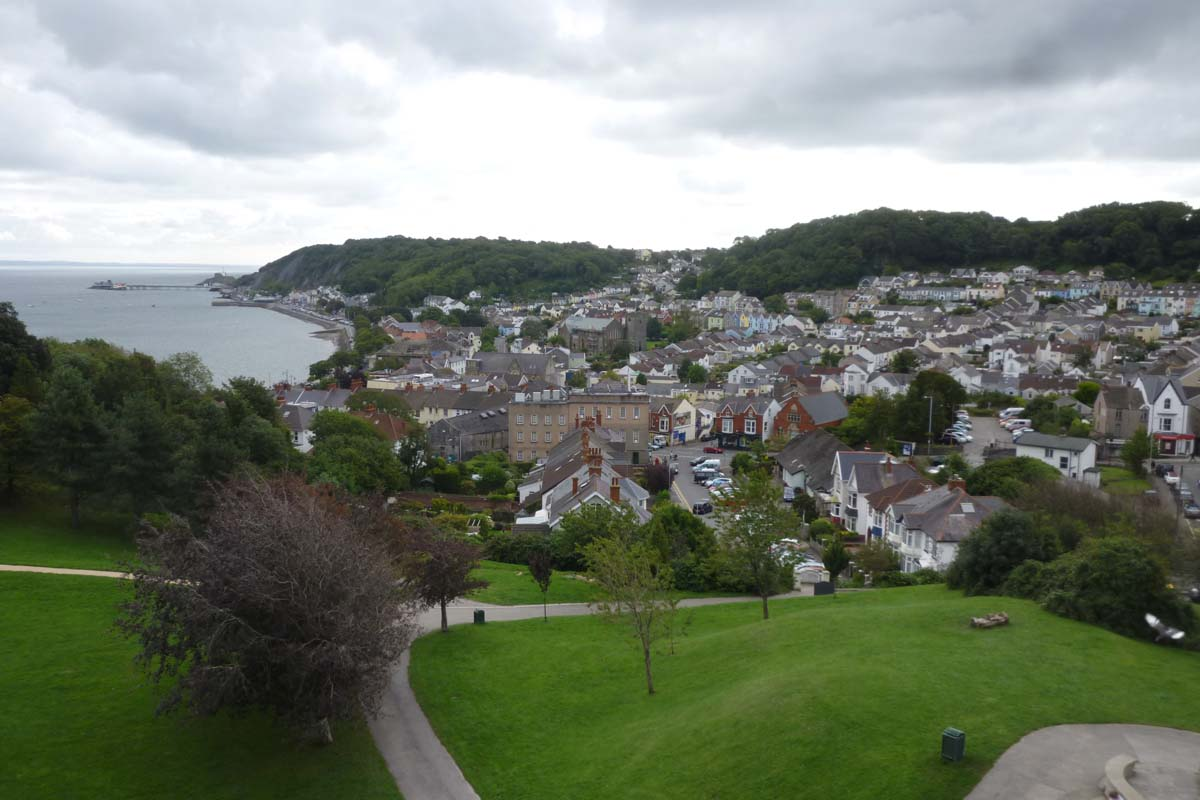
- The Mumbles viewed from Oystermouth Castle
- Principal area: Swansea
- Country: Wales
- Sovereign state: United Kingdom
- Police: South Wales
- Fire: Mid and West Wales
- Ambulance: Welsh
- List of places UK Wales Swansea Map of the community

Mumbles is a community in the City and County of Swansea, Wales, covering the district of the same name. The community covers the areas of Blackpill, Langland, Limeslade, Mayals, Mumbles Head, Newton, Norton, Oystermouth, Thistleboon and West Cross.

The population in 2011 was 16,600 making it the second biggest community in Swansea.

== Governance ==
Local administration was carried out by Oystermouth Urban District Council until 1918, when powers were handed to Swansea Council. Mumbles Community Council was created in 1983 to restore a level of local administration to the district. The community elects a community council of 18 councillors elected from the community wards of Mayals, Newton, Oystermouth and West Cross.

The community council made the news in early 2016 when they considered taking legal action over criticisms made about them on the social networking website, Streetlife.

Mumbles is also covered by the county wards of Mayals, West Cross and Mumbles, which elect councillors to Swansea Council. The latter named Mumbles ward was formed by merging the former Newton and Oystermouth wards, following a 2021 ward boundary review.
