= Sleeper (Torchwood) =

2008 Torchwood episode

15 – "Sleeper"
- Torchwood episode
- Beth reveals her true identity under the influence of the mindprobe.

Cast
- Starring: John Barrowman – Captain Jack Harkness; Eve Myles – Gwen Cooper; Burn Gorman – Owen Harper; Naoko Mori – Toshiko Sato; Gareth David-Lloyd – Ianto Jones
- Others: Nikki Amuka-Bird – Beth; Dyfed Potter – Mike; Doug Rollins – David; Claire Cage – David's wife; Sean Carlson – Mr Grainger; Victoria Pugh – Mrs Grainger; Luke Rutherford – Burglar 1; Alex Harries – Burglar 2; Dominic Coleman – Police officer; Paul Kasey – Weevil; William Hughes – Boy; Millie Philippart – Girl; Matthew Arwel-Pegram – Driver; Derek Lea – Paramedic

Production
- Directed by: Colin Teague
- Written by: James Moran
- Script editor: Brian Minchin
- Produced by: Richard Stokes; Chris Chibnall (co-producer)
- Executive producers: Russell T Davies; Julie Gardner
- Music by: Ben Foster
- Production code: 2.2
- Series: Series 2
- Running time: 50 mins
- First broadcast: 23 January 2008

Chronology
← Preceded by "Kiss Kiss, Bang Bang"	Followed by → "To the Last Man"

"Sleeper" is the second episode of the second series of the British science fiction television series Torchwood, which was first broadcast on BBC Two on 23 January 2008. A specially edited pre-watershed repeat was shown the following day.

In the episode, an alien sleeper cell with false memories attacks strategic targets in Cardiff to prepare the Earth for invasion.

== Plot ==
Torchwood are called to investigate fatal injuries sustained by two burglars in the failed attempt to rob a flat owned by Beth Halloran and her husband Mike. They suspect Beth is responsible, though she has no recollection of the events, but willingly goes with the team. When they return to the Hub and place Beth in one of the cells, a nearby Weevil cowers at Beth's presence. Jack suspects there is more to Beth than she lets on, and orders her to undergo a mind probe.

After numerous evaluations under the probe, they suddenly discover alien technology buried under Beth's right forearm, allowing it to transform into a bladed weapon that matches the injuries on the burglars. Jack surmises that she is an alien sleeper agent, yet to be activated by her controller and given the belief she is human through memory transplants. Beth's transceiver is cut off from the other sleeper agents, and placed in an alien cryogenic chamber until Torchwood can find a way to prevent her from activating.

At the same time, other sleeper agents are awakened by a signal and set off for assigned targets and killing those that get in their way. Two of them commit suicide bombings using explosives in the implants, destroying a communications centre and a military pipeline. David, the last of the advance guard, kills the council member in charge of emergency responses. Beth escapes by using her alien implant to make her heart rate appear flat, goes to the hospital to say goodbye to Mike, before accidentally stabbing him. Jack and Gwen apprehend Beth, and she agrees to try to help locate any other sleeper agents.

Extrapolating from the targets already hit and the signal that Beth has received, Torchwood deduce David is likely targeting a nearby military base that stores nuclear weapons; a bomb detonated in the base would likely wipe out much of the surrounding areas. Jack rushes to stop David. Unable to reach his target in time, David warns Torchwood that there are numerous other agents around Earth, before his implant explodes harmlessly outside the base.

Back at the Hub, Beth is conflicted with the thoughts that she could kill again. Rather than be cryogenically frozen again, Beth uses her implant, transformed into a blade, to threaten Gwen, forcing the other Torchwood members to shoot and kill Beth.

== Production ==
The explosion of a building that was scheduled to be filmed in Cardiff on 1 July 2007, the day after 2007 Glasgow International Airport attack, was in danger of being cancelled. Instead, the filming was announced via the local media to warn the public that there would be a controlled explosion, and not another terrorist attack.

=== Cast notes ===
Nikki Amuka-Bird, who plays Beth Halloran, later played the Glass Woman in the 2017 Doctor Who Christmas Special, "Twice Upon A Time".

William Hughes, who plays the Graingers' son, previously appeared as the eight-year-old version of the Master in the 2007 Doctor Who episode "The Sound of Drums".

Derek Lea, who plays the Sleeper Agent/Paramedic; also appears as a worker being examined by Martha Jones at the ATMOS factory in the 2008 Doctor Who episode "The Sontaran Stratagem" and as a taxi driver in "Partners in Crime".

== Reception ==
Broadcast at 9pm on BBC 2 on 23 January 2008, the episode achieved 3.4 million viewers, a 14% share, "a solitary share point" down on the share of the season 2 debut episode on 17 January, according to The Guardian's report of overnight returns. BARB later listed the episode as BBC2's top audience draw for week ending 27 January 2008, on a certified estimate of 3.78 million viewers including timeshift.
