= Mumble =

Mumble may refer to:

- Mumble (Happy Feet), the main character from the Happy Feet franchise
- Mumble (software), open source voice over IP client/server
- Mumble Bumble, a Canadian children's animated television program
- Mumble rap, a disputed subgenre of hip-hop music, considered by some to be a pejorative

== See also ==
- Mumbles (disambiguation)
