= Bishopston, Swansea =

Bishopston: Welsh: Llandeilo Ferwallt
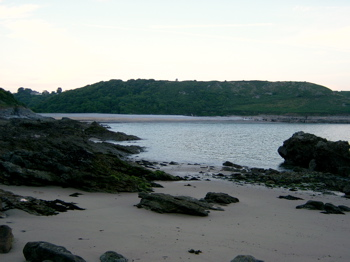
- Pwll-Du Bay

- Location within Swansea
- Population: 3,251 (ward 2011)
- OS grid reference: SS5888
- Community: Bishopston
- Principal area: Swansea
- Preserved county: West Glamorgan
- Country: Wales
- Sovereign state: United Kingdom
- Post town: SWANSEA
- Postcode district: SA3
- Dialling code: 01792
- Police: South Wales
- Fire: Mid and West Wales
- Ambulance: Welsh
- UK Parliament: Gower
- Senedd Cymru – Welsh Parliament: Gŵyr Abertawe
- List of places UK Wales Swansea 51.575°N 4.051°W Map of the community

Bishopston (Welsh: Llandeilo Ferwallt, historically also Llanmerwallt and Llancyngur Trosgardi) is a large village and community situated on the Gower Peninsula, 6 miles (9.7 km) west south west of the centre of Swansea in South Wales.

It is partly within the Gower Peninsula Area of Outstanding Natural Beauty (AONB).

The church, located at the head of Bishopston Valley, is dedicated to St Teilo who gives the village its Welsh name. Bishopston gives its name to the Bishopston Mudstone, a name used by geologists to refer to a rock formation with a widespread occurrence in south Wales.

== Etymology ==
The name Bishopston originates from the Norman Conquest, although pre-Norman names for the town vary. One name was Llanmerwall (or Llanmerwallt), and is similar to the modern Welsh name. Two further names are recorded: Porthdulon (or Porthtulon), possibly referring to the area of Caswell, and Llancyngur Trosgardi.

== Geography ==
The Bishopston electoral ward consists of part or all of the following areas: Barland Common, Caswell, Clyne Common (Welsh: Rhos-Glyn), Bishopston (Welsh: Llandeilo-ferwallt), Manselfield (Welsh: Maesyfaen), Murton (Welsh: Morthw), and Oldway (Welsh: Henlôn) in the parliamentary constituency of Gower.

It is bounded by the Bristol Channel to the south; and the wards of: Pennard (Welsh: Llanarthbodu) to the west; Fairwood (Welsh: Llwynffair) to the north; and Mayals, West Cross (Welsh: Crwys Fawr) and Newton (Welsh: Trenewydd) to the east.

=== Beaches ===
Caswell Bay is a popular local beach due to its facilities and accessibility by car and seasonal bus services. Other Bishopston beaches, such as Pwlldu Bay and Brandy Cove, which can only be visited on foot, see fewer visitors.

== Population and housing ==
Bishopston is one of the largest villages on the Gower peninsula. Its population has increased steadily from the beginning of the 19th century. In 1801, the first census of England and Wales reported that 303 people were living in 73 houses in the parish of Bishopston. By 1931 the population had increased to around 1,500 people living in 369 houses. In 2001 the population of the village was 3,341. The village experienced significant growth between the First and Second World Wars and in the 1960s.

Bishopston's rural location has influenced the pattern of its development. Most houses are detached or semi-detached and have large gardens. As a result, property in the area is expensive by South Wales standards. Nearly all of the property in Bishopston is privately owned, with only 1% of homes rented from the local authority.

Bishopston and the Gower was named one of the best places to live in Wales in 2017.

== Shops and facilities ==
Bishopston has several shops including a Co-op. Other local services include a hotel and cafe, three public houses, a petrol station, retirement homes, post office, church halls, sports hall, gym, medical centre and children's play area.

A group of local teenagers has campaigned since 2018 for a pump track to be built in the area, with Mansel Green having been chosen as the preferred site. As of September 2021, planning permission for the track had not been granted.

== Education ==
Bishopston Primary School and Bishopston Comprehensive School provide education locally. The first phase of a £13.8m refurbishment was completed at the comprehensive school in 2021, comprising science labs and a drama studio.

== Sport ==
Bishopston has its own rugby club, South Gower RFC, and a football side named South Gower AFC.
