= Brandy Cove =

Beach and cove in Swansea, Wales

Coordinates: 51°34′02″N 4°02′31″W

Brandy Cove (Welsh: Bae gîl) is a very small beach in the Gower Peninsula, south Wales, that is much less accessible than Caswell Bay immediately to the east. It is set at the end of a valley from Bishopston village. It is reachable by footpath from Bishopston or from Caswell Bay over some steep cliffs. The bay gets its name from stories of smugglers using the bay to unload their illegal tobacco and alcohol goods during the eighteenth century.

The sandy stretches of the beach are only exposed at low tide. It is a Pleistocene raised beach where the surrounding geography shows evidence that the sea level was once thirty feet higher than it is today.

The beach has a couple of legends of the supernatural associated with it. One is about a witch who lived in the caves near the beach. The other story is connected to a chilling real life murder that took place near the beach in 1919. Nearby villagers claimed that they could hear screams coming from the caves near the beach at night.
