= Bishopston Comprehensive School =

Secondary school in Swansea, Wales

Coordinates: 51.5841°N 4.0493°W

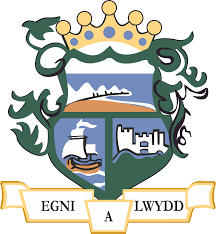

Location
- The Glebe, Bishopston; Swansea, City and County of Swansea, SA33JP; Wales

Information
- Type: Secondary School
- Motto: An outstanding, nurturing, learning community founded upon mutual respect; empowering all to be lifelong learners and the best that they can be.
- Opened: 1976
- Local authority: Swansea
- Headmistress: Mrs Alison Sykes
- Gender: Co-educational
- Age: 11 to 16
- Enrolment: 1,118 - 2024
- Houses: Glyndŵr (White), Hywel (Red), Llewelyn (Green) and Rhys (Blue)
- Colours: Yellow and green
- Website: Bishopston Comprehensive School

Bishopston Comprehensive School (Welsh: Ysgol Gyfun Llandeilo Ferwallt) is a comprehensive school in Bishopston, Swansea, Wales. It provides education to GCSE level, and has an enrollment as of September 2023 of 1,109 pupils and a total of 1,112 pupils. It was founded in 1976, in The Glebe, Bishopston, in the Gower Peninsula. The school is adjacent to the Bishopston Sports Centre (Welsh: Canolfan Chwaraeon Llandeilo Ferwallt) and Bishopston Primary School (Welsh: Ysgol Gynradd Llandeilo Ferwallt).

== Senior leadership team ==
- Headteacher: Mrs Alison Sykes
- Deputy Headteacher: Mrs C Ratti
- Assistant Headteacher KS4: Mr A Thomas
- Assistant Headteacher KS3: Mrs C Ratti
- Head of ALNCo: Mrs A Pierce
- Business Manager: Ms M Box
- Head of IT and Marketing: Miss M Davies
- Head of Educational Research: Mrs S Forwood

== History ==
Bishopston Comprehensive School was founded in 1976, in The Glebe, Bishopston, Swansea, Wales. It was founded after Bishopston Primary School, both Juniors and Infants.

On 9 February 2024 a "ground movement" was measured at the school, causing temporary closure. Online lessons were provided. The school reopened to all pupils and staff on Wednesday, 6 March.

== Facilities ==
The facilities of the school have been recently refurbished with a new look. On July 7, 2023, David Hopkins, deputy leader of Swansea Council, opened the refurbished and remodelled school. It has a new science and art block, a new SLT block, CTouch boards in every classroom, and fresh new interiors and furniture.

The school has a cafeteria, a drama hall, 2 gyms, a shared sports hall, multiple rugby and football pitches, an STF facility and is known for its high quality of education and life across many aspects of the school.

== Exam and inspection results ==
Most pupils pass, with 92.8% of them achieving grade C or more, and within these passes, 44.6% achieved an A or an A star. Within these passes, 44.4% achieved 5 As and A stars, 55 pupils achieving 10 or more As and A stars, and 10 pupils achieving all A stars.

In its 2017 Estyn inspection report, the school was reported "excellent" in all six areas of inspection. It is the first comprehensive school in Wales to have this title.
