= Oystermouth =

Coordinates: 51.5758°N 4.0072°W

Oystermouth: Welsh: Ystumllwynarth
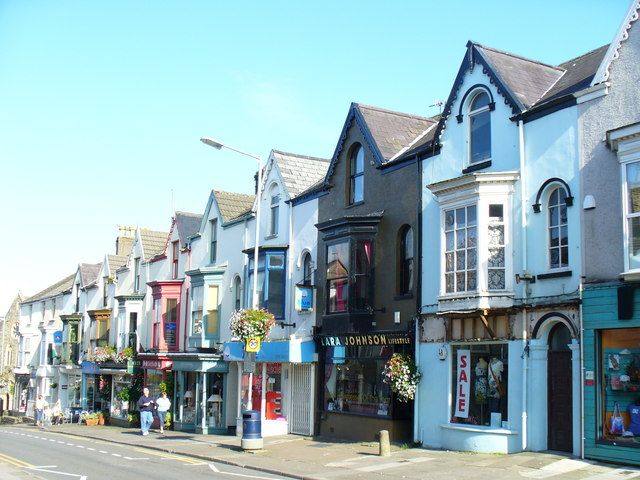
- Shops in Oystermouth

- Location within Swansea
- Area: 2.01 km^{2} (0.78 sq mi)
- Population: 4,160 (2011 census)
  - Density: 2,070/km^{2} (5,400/sq mi)
- Principal area: Swansea
- Preserved county: West Glamorgan
- Country: Wales
- Sovereign state: United Kingdom
- Post town: SWANSEA
- Postcode district: SA3
- Dialling code: 01792
- Police: South Wales
- Fire: Mid and West Wales
- Ambulance: Welsh
- UK Parliament: Gower
- Senedd Cymru – Welsh Parliament: Gŵyr Abertawe

Oystermouth (Welsh: Ystumllwynarth) is a village (and former electoral ward) in the district of Mumbles, Swansea, Wales. It is part of the Mumbles community (civil parish).

== Etymology ==
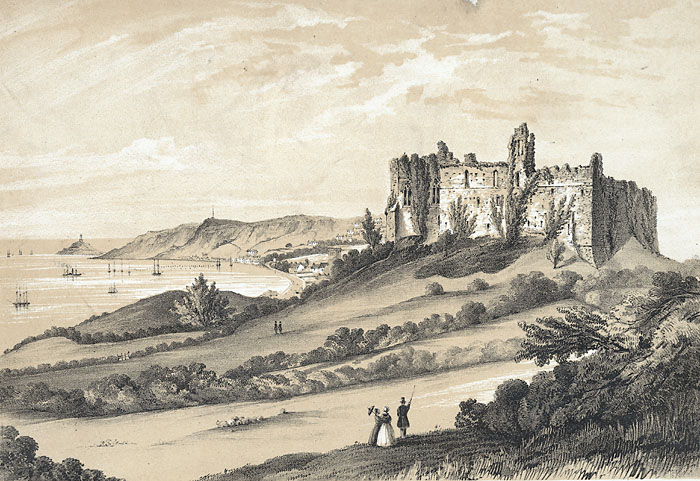
Oystermouth castle and the village in 1839.

Samuel Lewis and Nicholas Carlisle both state that the original Welsh name was Caer Tawy (the Caer of the river Tawe).

Thomas Morgan noted that the modern Welsh name, Ystumllwynarth was also found in early Medieval Welsh literature. Morgan derives this name from Ystum Lluarth which he defined as a "place of entrenchment on a hill" adding that the English name Oystermouth, is both a corruption of the existing Welsh name and a folk etymology connected to the locality's famous oyster beds.

== History ==
When the parish church was restored in 1860, fragments of Roman tessellated pavement were found in various parts of the churchyard. Roman coins were also found in the village in 1822 and 1837, all indicating that there had been a small settlement here in Roman times.

The name Caer Tawy would indicate the existence of a Welsh-built fortification here predating the construction of both Norman castles at Oystermouth and Swansea.

The castle (see below) dates from the 12th century.

== Description ==
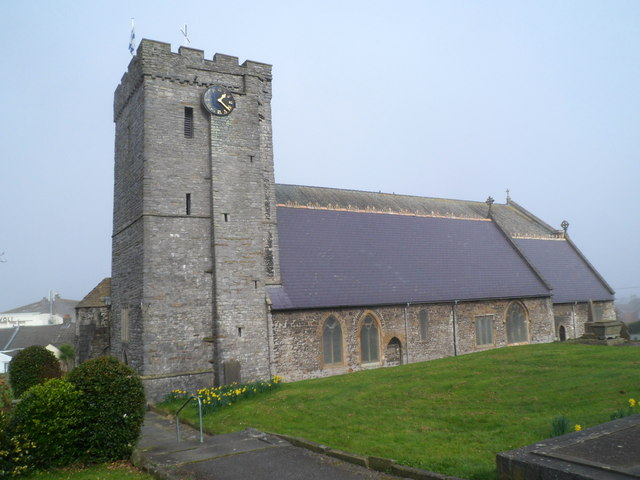
The Church of All Saints

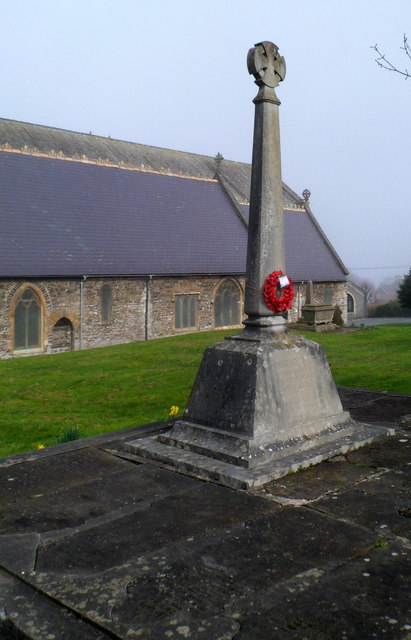
Oystermouth war memorial

The ward consists of suburban housing stretching from the northwest to the southeast. It is surrounded by the sea to the east and south. Two hills at Rams Tor and Mumbles Hill have little development. Mumbles Hill is now a protected nature reserve managed by the local council. The boundaries of Mumbles community and the Oystermouth ward are clearly defined. However, in the public mind, the separation between villages of Oystermouth and Mumbles is not clear. Local buses to the area are signed as Oystermouth, although most people from the area would say they are living in Mumbles.

Local beaches include the southern tip of Swansea Bay, Bracelet Bay and Limeslade Bay. From the Mumbles Head area, there are views towards Swansea, Port Talbot, and the hills of the South Wales Coalfield.

Oystermouth is the site of Oystermouth Cemetery.

Oystermouth was served by the Swansea and Mumbles Railway, one of the very earliest passenger rail services, along a shoreline railway used in the 19th century to transport limestone and coal. The long-disused (since the 1960s) route remains as a cycle/footpath.

Oystermouth parish is part of the Church in Wales. It has two churches: All Saints' Church, Oystermouth, and Norton Mission Church. All Saints' Church dates back as far as the 12th-century, with 19th-century additions and has a Grade II heritage listing.

Rowan Williams took the title Baron Williams of Oystermouth upon his retirement as Archbishop of Canterbury in December 2012.

=== Oystermouth Castle ===
The 12th-century Oystermouth Castle is well preserved, in grounds with views over Swansea Bay. It was rebuilt in stone by the de Braoses, who were Lords of the Gower, and visited briefly by King Edward I of England in 1284. By the 16th century the castle was abandoned and in ruins.

== Electoral ward ==
Until 2022 the electoral ward consisted of some or all of the following areas: Oystermouth, the Mumbles, Thistleboon, Limeslade, in the parliamentary constituency of Gower. The ward was bounded by Newton to the west, West Cross to the north and Swansea Bay to the south and east. As of 2010 it had a population of around 4,100.

Following a ward boundary review, the Oystermouth and Newton wards were combined to create a new ward of Mumbles, represented by three county councillors.

=== 2012 local council election ===
For the 2012 local council elections, electorate turnout for Oystermouth was 37.23%. The election results were:

2005 Swansea Council election: Oystermouth
Candidate	Party	Votes	%
Anthony Colburn	Conservative	500	39.84
Pam Erasmus	Labour	444	35.38
Dorian Davies	Independent	311	24.78
Total		1,255	100.00
Registered voters/turnout			37.23%
Conservative hold			

Tony Colburn was re-elected in May 2012 with a vote of 500, on a 37.2% turnout.

The ward had been represented continuously by the Conservative Party since 1995.

== See also ==
- Oystermouth Cemetery
