= West Cross (electoral ward) =

Coordinates: 51.58267°N 4.00758°W

West Cross ward
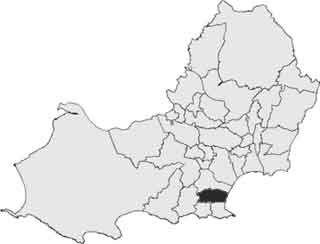
- Area: 2.48 km^{2} (0.96 sq mi)
- Population: 6,448 (2011 census)
  - Density: 2,600/km^{2} (6,700/sq mi)
- Principal area: Swansea
- Preserved county: West Glamorgan
- Country: Wales
- Sovereign state: United Kingdom
- UK Parliament: Gower
- Senedd Cymru – Welsh Parliament: Gŵyr Abertawe
- Councillors: Sara Keeton (Labour); Rebecca Fogarty (Labour)

West Cross is an electoral ward in the Mumbles community and a suburb in the City and County of Swansea, Wales, UK. The ward falls within the Mumbles community.

The electoral ward consists of some or all of the following areas: Manselfield, Norton, West Cross, Mumbles and Newton, in the parliamentary constituency of Gower. It is bordered by the wards of Mayals to the north; Swansea Bay to the east; Oystermouth and Newton to the south; and Bishopston to the west.

== 2008 Swansea Council election ==
The turnout for the 2008 local council elections for West Cross was 47%. The results were:

Candidate	Party	Votes	Status
Mark Child	Labour	1050	Labour hold
Desmond Thomas	Labour	1034	Labour hold
Elaine Hughes	Conservatives	894	
Philip Swinnerton	Conservatives	771	
Simon Arthur	Liberal Democrats	440	
William Jones	Liberal Democrats	377	
Marion Williams	Green Party	187	
Erica Powell	Green Party	144	
