= Caswell Bay =

Beach in Swansea, Wales

Coordinates: 51.56885°N 4.03336°W

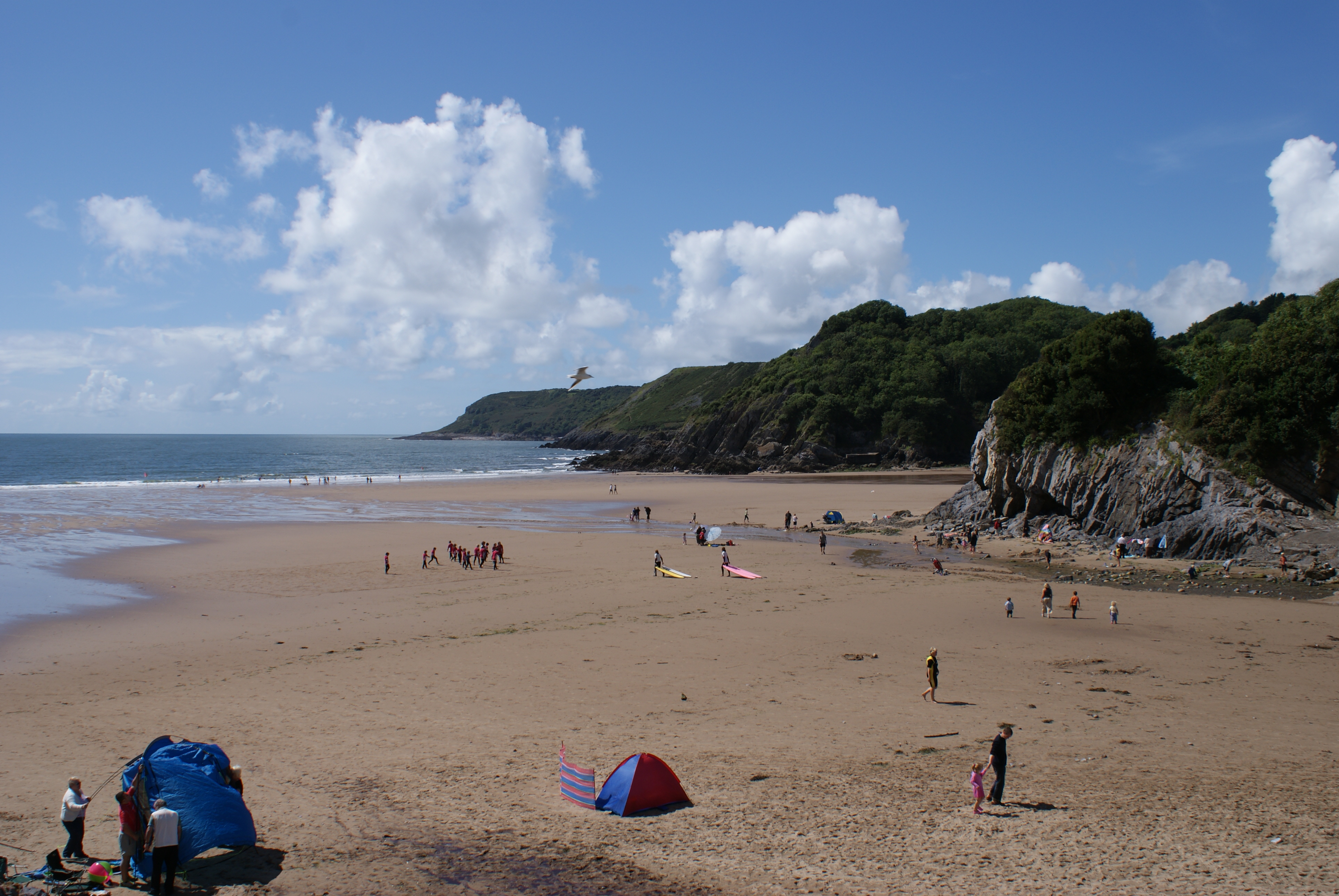
Caswell Bay, a beach on the Gower Peninsula, Swansea, in August 2008.

Caswell Bay (Welsh: Bae Cas-wellt; meaning: straw fortress), is a beach on the south east of the Gower Peninsula, Swansea, Wales. It is a sandy beach popular with families, holiday makers and surfers, and it regularly achieves Blue Flag status.

== Facilities and access ==
There is good access to Caswell Bay by car and public transport by First Cymru from Swansea Bus Station. There is a large pay and display car park and buses go to the nearby village of Oystermouth and the Mumbles. To the east is a well maintained coastal path leading to the neighbouring Langland Bay. To the west is a more rural path leading to Brandy Cove and Pwlldu Bay.

Caswell Bay has a cafe, which is open all year round, and a beach shop. The Surfside Cafe suffered severe storm damage in January and February 2014, but reopened in the spring following repair and refurbishment. There are also public toilets and outdoor public showers.

Swansea City Council operate a Lifeguard service 7 days a week from early May to the beginning of September. The bay is a popular surfing location and is home to a surf school offering lessons all year round. It has a fully adaptive and inclusive surf centre, which opened in 2020 next to the public car park. It is also a renowned rock pooling location.

The Bishop's Wood nature reserve sits behind the bay, a rare example of a limestone woodland. The nature reserve is open to the public for unaccompanied visits at any time. Educational tours can be arranged through the Bishop's Wood countryside centre.

From 1 May to 30 September, dogs are not permitted on the beach.

== History ==
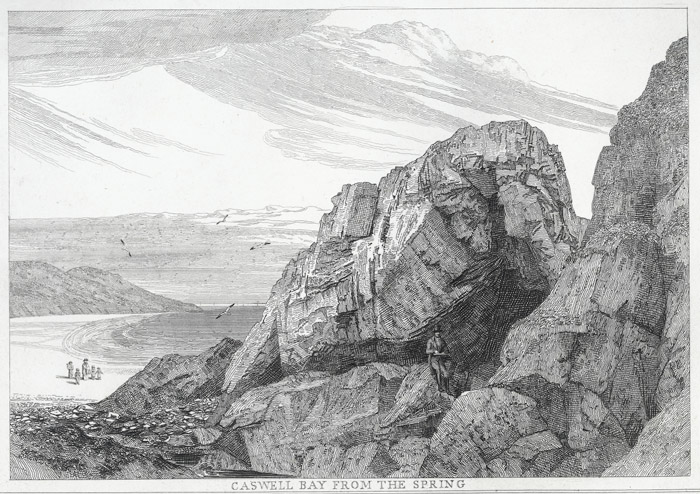
Baxter, 1818

Between 1829 and 1840 much of the land around Caswell Bay was bought by John James, a former Curate of Bishopston, for his daughter and his son-in-law, Charles Morgan. In 1846, The Morgans sold a piece of land on the eastern side of the bay to 19th Century pioneer photographer John Dillwyn Llewelyn who was a regular visitor to the bay. Llewelyn built a holiday home, Caswell Cottage, which stood until around 1960 on the site of what is now the Caswell Bay public car park. In 1854 images of two of his photographs of Caswell Bay were requested by Prince Albert. In August 1878 Llewelyn's thirteen-year-old grandson drowned whilst swimming in the bay, with the inquest held at the Caswell Bay Hotel.

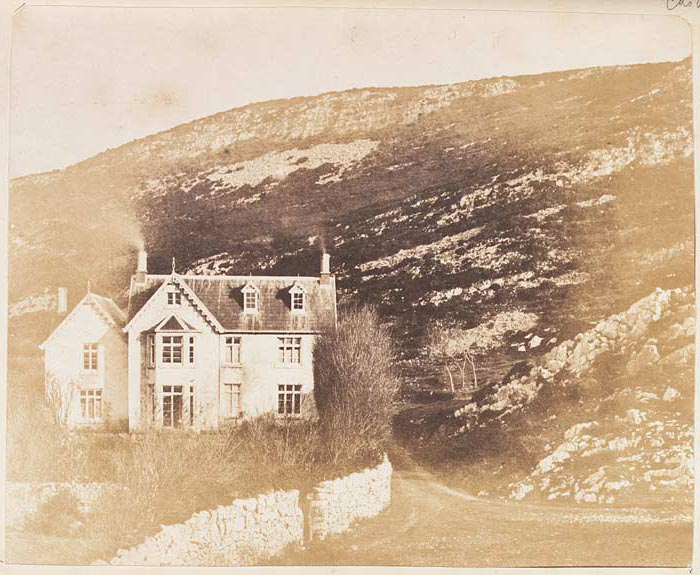
Caswell Cottage. The holiday home of John Dillwyn Llewelyn and his family

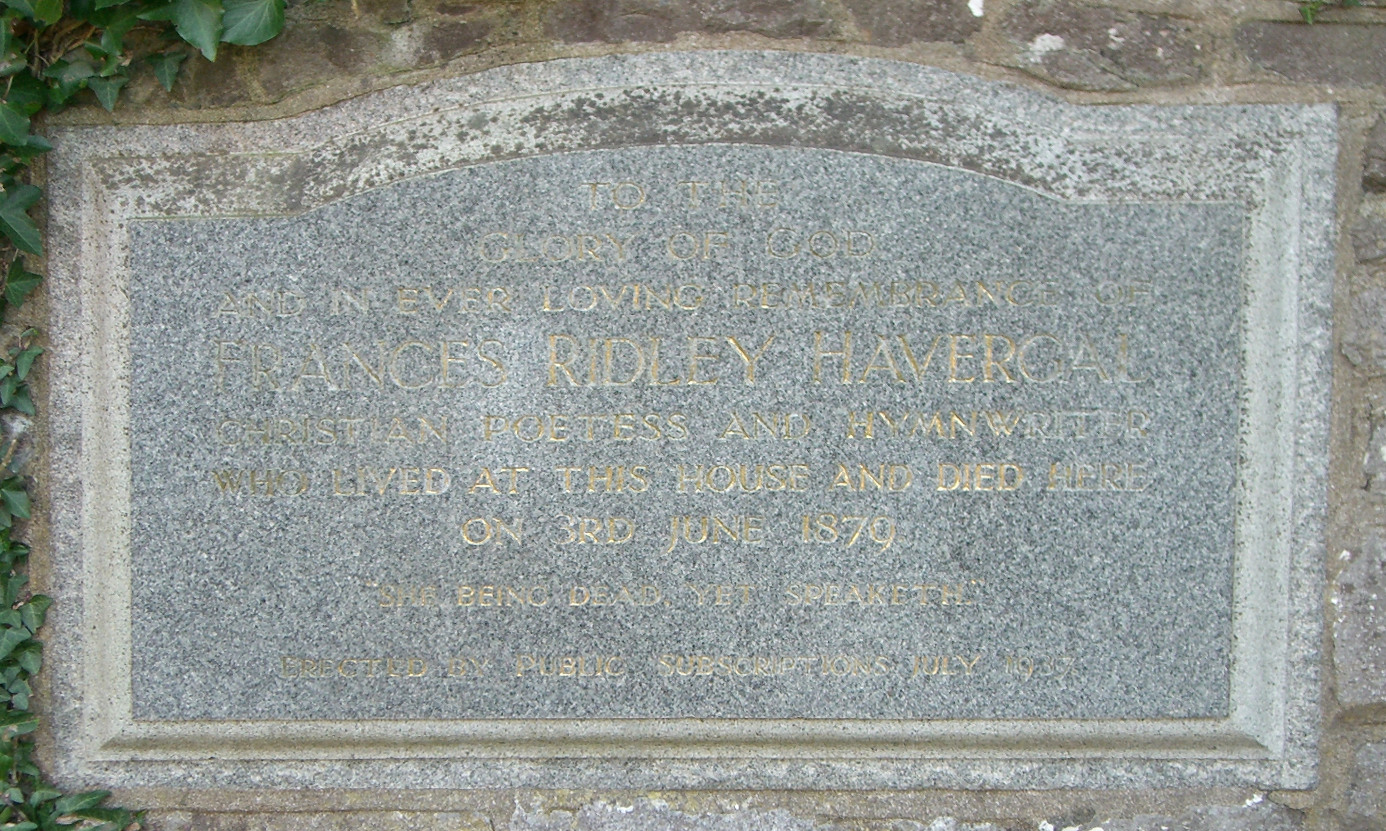
Frances Ridley Havergal's memorial plaque near Caswell Bay

After the death of Mrs Charles Morgan in 1877, her Caswell Estate was divided amongst her six children. Soon afterwards, a portion of the land on the western side of the bay was sold to the Davenport family who built a large house on the land. The house was called Redcliffe, named after Redley Cliff which bounds the western side of the bay. In the late 1920s Redcliffe was the family home of poet Vernon Watkins, a contemporary and close friend of Dylan Thomas. The house stood until the 1960s when it was demolished to make way for the Redcliffe apartments that now overlook the west side of the bay.

The three daughters of Mrs Charles Morgan, Emma, Agnes and Alice made Caswell Bay their home from 1877 and built many of the houses which remain to this day, including their own home, Bay House which stands above the centre of the bay. The sisters also planted many of the bay's distinctive pine trees.

In 1879, the religious poet and hymn writer Frances Ridley Havergal died of peritonitis in a house near Caswell Bay. A memorial plaque commemorates this.

In 1883 a wind pump was built at the peak of Redley Cliff to pump water to nearby houses. The wind pump was badly damaged in a gale less than five years later and had ceased to be used by 1900. It remained a landmark until it was destroyed for safety reasons in 1930 having been badly damaged in a suspicious fire. On top of Redley Cliff there is also evidence of the existence of a defended Iron Age enclosure.

In the 1890s a large concrete water tank was built at the base of the cliff, which remains to this day. The water tank was used to collect water from a small spring during the late 19th century. Around the same time a pump house was built on the eastern side of the bay. The sea soon smashed it and a replacement was built near the road consisting of two buildings built a short time apart. By the end of World War I the pump house was no longer required and for a time it was used as a café. The newer of the two buildings remains to this day alongside the base of the older building.

For more than forty years in the 20th century, Caswell Bay played a central role in a murder mystery. Less than 2 years after settling in a house overlooking Caswell Bay, George Shotton and his wife Mamie Stuart mysteriously disappeared before Christmas 1919. When police tracked down Shotton in 1920 they feared he had murdered Mamie Stuart, but were unable to find the evidence. On 5 November 1961 a sack of human bones was found in a disused mine at the nearby Brandy Cove. A coroner's inquest determined the remains were those of the missing Mamie Stuart. After an extensive manhunt George Shotton was traced to a cemetery in Bristol, having died just 3 years earlier.

On the cliff top above the centre of the bay are the Caswell Bay Court apartments which were built in the 1990s on the site previously occupied by the Caswell Bay Hotel. The hotel was expanded from a simple Victorian villa built in the 1850s.

In 2006 Caswell Bay was named as one of the top 50 beaches in the UK by The Guardian newspaper.

In 2020 the world's first purpose-built, fully adaptive surf centre was built at Caswell Bay. The centre was built by a team of volunteers as part of a special episode of the television programme DIY SOS for BBC Children in Need.
