= West Cross =

Coordinates: 51.58323°N 4.00143°W

- Location within Swansea
- OS grid reference: SS614890
- Principal area: Swansea
- Preserved county: West Glamorgan
- Country: Wales
- Sovereign state: United Kingdom
- Post town: SWANSEA
- Postcode district: SA3
- Dialling code: 01792
- Police: South Wales
- Fire: Mid and West Wales
- Ambulance: Welsh
- UK Parliament: Gower
- Senedd Cymru – Welsh Parliament: Gŵyr Abertawe

West Cross is a suburban area of Swansea, Wales, located to the south of Swansea city centre, near Mumbles falling within the West Cross ward.

== Description ==
A high majority of the homes are Council built, but many have been sold to the occupiers in the council's right to buy policy scheme during the 1970s and 1980s. Along with homes being bought, the council had to upgrade a number of the houses during the 1980s, as they were of the BISF (British Iron and Steel Federation) prefabricated design and had to be brought up to current safety standards by removing asbestos insulation and replacing the structure rods. Along with the Council designed/built homes, private homes were built (by home development companies) from the 1950s and 1960s onwards. The area also includes: two parks, three schools, two pubs and various small (convenience) stores. The area is also home to a Territorial Army centre.

=== Education ===
Ysgol Gynradd Gymraeg Llwynderw, a Welsh-medium primary school, relocated from its temporary premises in Singleton Park to West Cross Lane in West Cross in September 2008. The school serves the Swansea West area and is now housed in modern purpose-built premises at West Cross. In 2017 it had 330 students. UNICEF gave the school a Level Two Rights Respecting Award because the school prohibits employees from yelling at students.
