= Cuisine of Ceredigion =

Welsh regional cuisine

The coast of Ceredigion is made up of a long coastal plain that contains high cliffs, coves, large bays and estuaries. The coastal plain gets narrower towards the more mountainous north of the county and is cut by the wide estuaries of the Teifi and the Dyfi. The broad and fertile Teifi valley is ideal for dairy farming and mixed farming. Heavy rainfall washes the minerals out of the soil and results in the mountainous areas of the county having relatively poorer, acidic soils. The plough line can be as low as 700 feet, which restricts cultivation.

== Sea fish ==
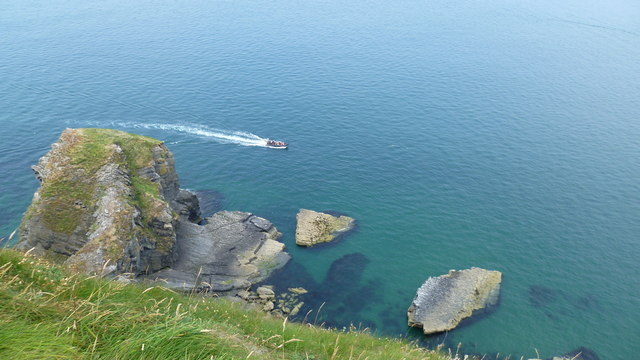
Sea cliffs south of New Quay

The sea around Ceredigion has traditionally been rich in fish and for many centuries great shoals of herring would be caught in Cardigan Bay. The fish would be landed and sold at all the Ceredigion ports, including Aberaeron, Aberporth and Aberystwyth. At Aberystwyth the volume of herring landed increased significantly after the harbour was enlarged during the eighteenth century. Here, the fish were salted between September and November and then packed in barrels for transport by train to England. Herring was also an important food source for local people and the fish were salted in the autumn for winter use.

In South Wales, herring are known as Ysgadenyn (or Sgadan for short); in North Wales, they are known as Pennog. At Aberporth, herrings were sold to the following:

Sgadan Aberporth,
Dau fola ac un corff,
Sgadan Aberporth,
Dau enaid mewn un corff
Aberporth herrings,
two bellies in one body.
Aberporth herrings,
two souls in one body

Swper Scadan, or Supper Herrings, is a traditional baked dish from the area and contains six to eight herrings which have been cleaned, scaled and filleted. A seasoning of mustard, salt and ground black pepper is spread on the inside of each herring fillet and the fillets are then rolled and laid on top of layers of thin potato slices, onions and apples, which form a base. The whole dish is topped off with more sliced potatoes, additional seasoning and a dessert spoon of sage. Boiling water is added and then the dish is baked in foil which is removed, when nearly ready, in order to brown the potatoes. Historically, this dish is considered to be an interesting recipe because it reflects the simplicity of the traditional Welsh kitchen prior to the introduction of the frying pan. At this time boiling, roasting and stewing were the most common methods of food preparation and kitchen utensils included the griddle, the tripod (which was used for roasting), the bakestone and a great iron pot which would be suspended over a fire. Salted herrings would also be roasted on the tripod, as an alternative to baking.

Coat of arms of Ceredigion showing a herring in the top right hand corner of the shield

The traditional importance of fishing, and in particular the herring trade, is reflected in the coat of arms of the county, which were officially granted on October 21, 1937, and which have emblazoned in the top right quarter a herring against a background of the sea, to signify the fishing industry of Ceredigion

Mackerel (Macrell) are also plentiful in Cardigan Bay. They are in season from late June to early September and are considered to have an excellent flavour when fresh. Bobby Freeman commented that this fish is at its best when "the sea-green colours are very brilliant and beautiful, and the eyes are bright". In Ceredigion, Mackerel was usually fried in vegetable oil or olive oil. The olive oil used to be imported into the Ceredigion ports that used to trade with the Mediterranean. It is reported that in the 1880s, the fishermen of Aberaeron and New Quay once caught over one million mackerel over two nights. The fish were sold for a farthing each and what remained unsold from the mammoth catch was used on the fields as fertilizer.

Monkfish is commonly caught in Cardigan Bay and Colin Pressdee comments that this fish is particularly suitable for kebabs due to the solid texture of the flesh, which is not grainy or flaky. He comments that the large tail can also be roasted French-style, like a leg of lamb and explains that this gives it the French name of 'gigot de mer'. He notes that in Ceredigion, some restaurants cook the fish in this way and accompany it with a red wine sauce.

Teifi Fish Bake is a traditional local fish dish made from fillets of cod and smoked haddock which are skinned, cubed and covered in a parsley sauce. Diced potato and Teifi cheese are added before the dish is baked and garnished with fresh parsley.

Shellfish gathered from the shore once formed an important source of food for Ceredigion families. One traditional dish included scrambled eggs to which limpets (llygaid meheryn) and common periwinkles (gwichiaid) were added, these were then fried in bacon fat. Limpets would also be boiled with nettle tips, to help tenderise them, before being fried in oatmeal. S. Minwel Tibbott, in her book 'Welsh Fare', has a recipe for Limpet Pie (tarten lygaid), which is a traditional dish from Aberporth. The limpets are boiled for half an hour and then bacon and leeks are added to a pastry-lined dish before being baked. Sand eels (llymriaid) were also eaten as part of the local diet and were usually fried in bacon fat.

Lobster and shellfish are an important sea food industry for Ceredigion. However, by the 1980s, the lobster stock of Cardigan Bay had become seriously depleted and this led to the Development Board for Rural Wales commencing a restocking programme. As a result, 19,000 baby lobsters were tagged and released off Aberystwyth between 1984 and 1988.

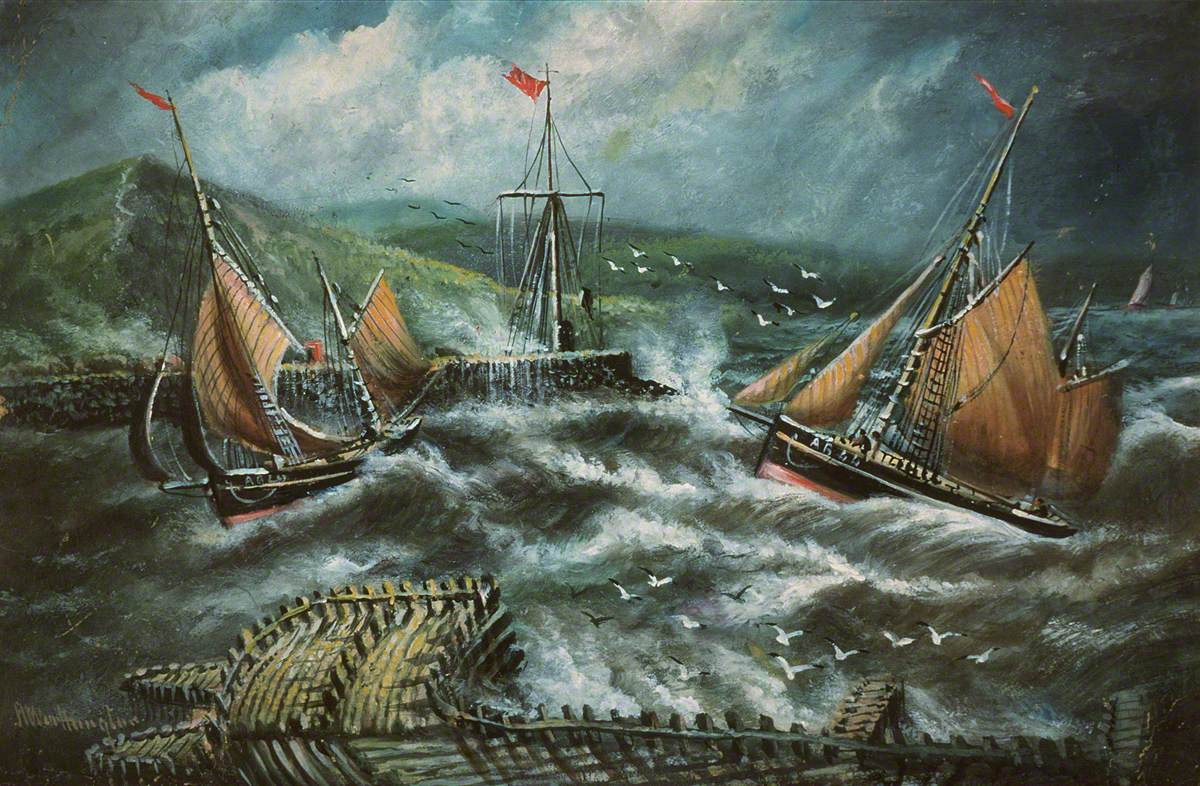
Trawlers entering Aberystwyth, painting by Alfred Worthington (1834–1927) in the art collection of the National Library of Wales.

Although fishing has been a traditional activity in Ceredigion for generations, fish stocks became heavily depleted due to commercial fishing. Today the trade is mainly restricted to local, part-time fishing boats. Gilli Davies comments that this means fishmongers and restaurants in places like Aberaeron usually serve fresh fish which may have been caught the same day, compared to deep sea fishing where the catch may spend up to two weeks at sea, before being transferred to market and consumed.

The traditional importance of sea food to the local economy is now celebrated with the Cardigan Bay Seafood Festival. This seafood festival is held each July at Aberaeron harbour. Aberaeron also hosts an annual Mackerel festival, in late August and early September, in order to celebrate the traditional importance of this fish to the economy of the town.

== Freshwater fish ==
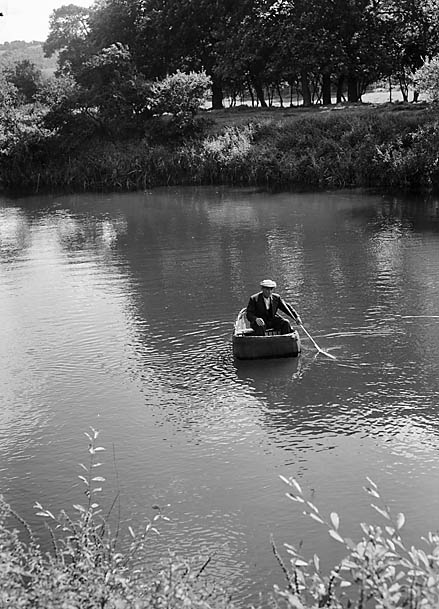
Coracle fishing on the River Teifi

Freshwater fish were also a traditional and important part of the Ceredigion diet. The River Teifi is noted for its salmon and sewin. The source of the river is located near Tregaron. The river then runs through a valley that was once "thick with mansions and former great houses" before entering the sea at Cardigan. It is said that during the nineteenth century salmon was so plentiful that servants begged not to be fed it more than three times a week. As a result, 'Teifi salmon sauce' is found in almost every collection of Welsh recipes from the kitchens of the Welsh country houses. Freeman notes that Welsh eighteenth century recipes tend to use a large quantity of butter, which reflects the fashion in most country house cooking of this period. Lady Llanover, in her book 'First Principles of Good Cookery', gives detailed instructions for crimping fresh-caught salmon in order to 'set' the flesh before the curd (which is the white substance between the flakes of orange flesh) melts and makes the fish oily. Fennel, which grows wild in Ceredigion, was often used in sauces for fish, especially salmon and mackerel.

Gerald of Wales commented on the spectacular sight of salmon leaping at the waterfalls at Cenarth while Bobby Freeman recalls that when she ran a hotel in Pembrokeshire in the 1960s, salmon from the river Teifi would be dropped off by bus outside the hotel, with the bus conductor carrying them in boxes to the kitchen. The fish had been packed in cool, fresh bracken with six or seven big fish to a box.

Salmon is in season in Wales from February to October, but the main runs of fish tend to be from June to September. When in the river salmon use their energy to produce roe ready for spawning and so the flesh begins to deteriorate quickly. For this reason Pressdee notes that gravid fish, which tend to be darker and thinner, should be avoided and left in the river to spawn. He also notes that wild salmon are considered to have a more solid and defined texture and flavour than farmed salmon and comments that this reflects their diet of shellfish, while farmed salmon, although more readily available, tends to have less muscular flesh and a more buttery taste.

Trout are also plentiful in the rivers of Ceredigion and are farmed commercially at Rhydlewis Trout Farm where the trout are raised in pools fed by the rivers Teifi and Ceri and smoked in wooden chambers.

== Lamb ==
The flavour of lamb from Welsh Mountain Sheep is influenced by geography. Ceredigion's coastal cliffs are subject to westerly winds which cover the cliffs in salt spray. The spray is caught by goose grass on which the lambs graze and this influences the flavour of the meat. Along estuaries and salt marshes, such as the Dyfi Estuary Mudflats, wild spearmint, samphire and sea beet give the meat a rich flavour, with saline nuances while lamb from upland areas, like Cader Idris, feed off mauve flowering heather in summer which gives the meat a more aromatic flavour.

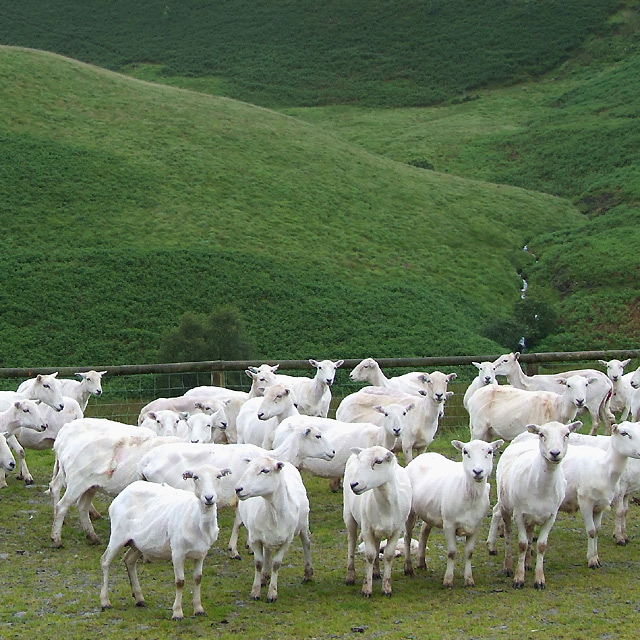
Welsh Mountain Sheep at Llanddewi Brefi - ewes shorn of their coats with Nant Coli stream in the background (photo by Roger Kidd)

The flavour of Welsh lamb is also influenced by the seasons. Spring lamb appears on sale from May each year and is sweet and mild-flavoured. Pressdee notes that this makes it ideal for light spring casseroles, particularly if warmth of flavour is required. Autumn lamb, however, acquires a stronger, gamey taste but can be richer in flavour and can be enhanced by the addition of fresh, wild field mushrooms.

Although Welsh Mountain Sheep are smaller than other British sheep breeds, it is considered to have a sweeter flavour and to have more meat nearer the bone. Generally, the shoulder of Welsh lamb is more succulent, and has a higher fat content, than the leg. However, due to the difficulty of carving it, shops tend to sell shoulder of lamb already boned and rolled.

Up until the nineteenth century, mutton was a popular dish in Wales. However, due to changes in farming practices and food preferences, it is no longer part of the staple diet. However, it can still be found in Victorian recipe books, where the salting, or 'powdering', of mutton and the preparation of 'Welsh Mutton Hams' was a regular item of daily fare. Mutton was commonly found in Ceredigion restaurants catering for the Victorian tourist trade.

The importance of sheep in the economy of Ceredigion is reflected in one of the banknotes of a now defunct Ceredigion bank called the Aberystwyth and Tregaron Bank, where the number of black sheep depicted on each banknote corresponded to the value of the note in pounds and with the £5 and £10 notes displaying one ram or two rams, respectively. This gave the bank its alternative name of the Black Sheep Bank or Banc y Ddafad Ddu.

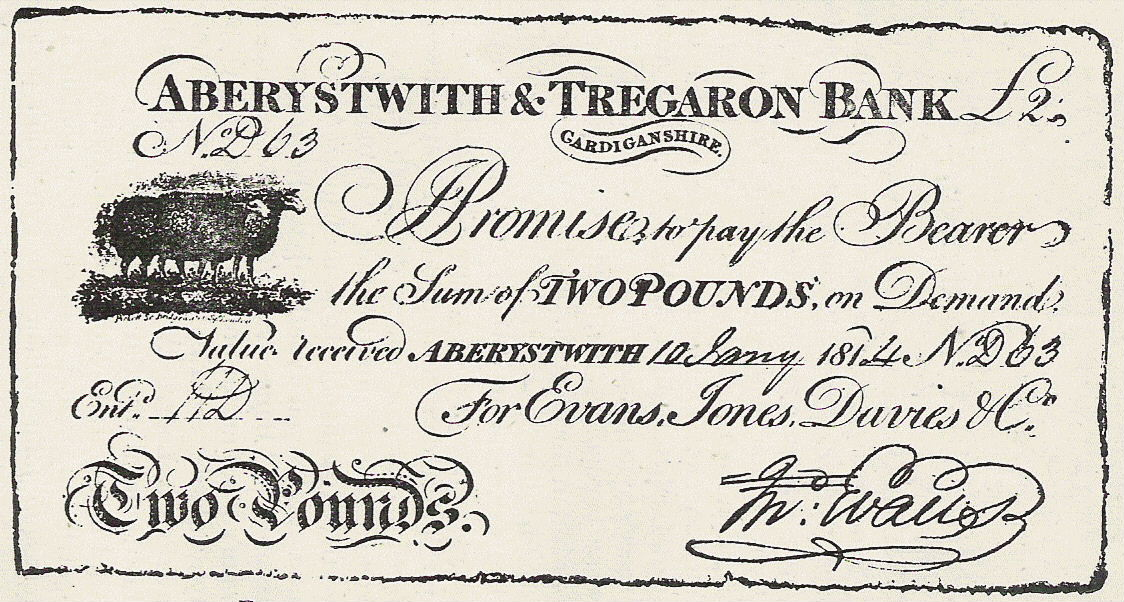
Banknote of the Aberystwith and Tregaron Bank

== Pork ==
Pigs have been an important part of the Ceredigion diet since Medieval times and are recorded in the Laws of Hywel Dda. Up until the middle of the twentieth century every cottage would keep a pig in the back yard. As a result, Welsh cookery books usually include several recipes which Freeman classifies as being based on the "bacon-plus-potatoes theme". The killing of the family pig would be a community event and village households would co-ordinate pig killing in order to avoid an over-supply of pork in the village. When a pig was killed, all the parts of the animal which couldn't be salted or eaten would be given to neighbours with each pig providing a stock of faggots, sausages, puddings, brawn and haslet. Haslet and faggots are still popular dishes in Wales and can usually be bought from the local market. Haslet is often called aislet or islet in Wales.

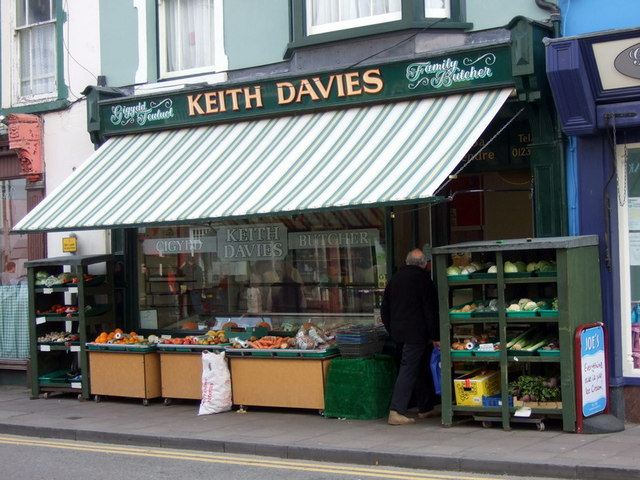
Butcher’s shop in Cardigan which also sells vegetables (photo by Ceridwen)

Pressdee comments that traditional butchers can be found in Ceredigion that produce dry-salted Welsh bacon and gammon from locally produced pork. The meat is considered to be generally of good value and widely available. He notes that the least expensive cut of pork is 'cig moch', or belly pork. Each farmhouse would traditionally cure its own bacon and the crackling from the belly, if cooked until crisp, was considered to be the most succulent part of a joint.

Sheila Barry recounts the keeping of pigs on Penrallt Farm, Llangranog shortly after World War II. The pigs would be killed during cold weather to keep the meat fresh. Barry recounts that the farm would kill two pigs a year with the first pig being killed in November, or the first week of December. If the pig was killed later than this then the task would overlap with the work of preparing poultry for the Christmas market. The second pig would be killed in early March. The fat from the pig would be rendered into lard which was clarified and stored in large, glazed earthenware jars for use in pastry and for roasting. Barry comments that the lard would keep for years, if covered and stored in a cool dairy. However, the lean meat would need to be eaten within ten days and the custom would be to give packs of meat to neighbours who would reciprocate when their pig was killed. The offal would be used to make brawn and faggots. After being hung for three days the rest of the pig would be cut into sections and salted to make bacon, with the salt being rubbed into the flesh twice a day for three or four weeks. Each bacon joint was then wrapped in fine muslin and hung from hooks in the ceiling of the living room to mature. Barry recalls that the practice ceased on the farm around 1953 as farms became more commercialised.

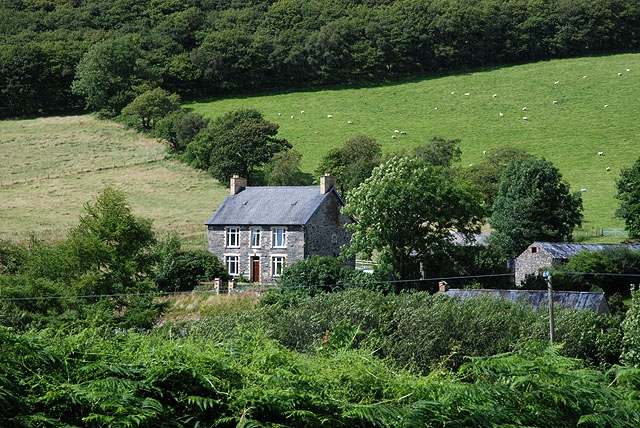
Glanrafon - an example of a traditional Ceredigion farm

== Beef ==
Welsh Black cattle are a relatively small but powerful breed of cattle that originates from Wales. They eat a wide variety of vegetation and this gives the meat a good flavour. At Llanerchaeron, the National Trust has a working farm which includes Welsh black cattle, together with other species of farm animals where they attempt to demonstrate the relationship between a country house, its service courtyard and the home farm and where visitors can see activities from a full year's farming calendar

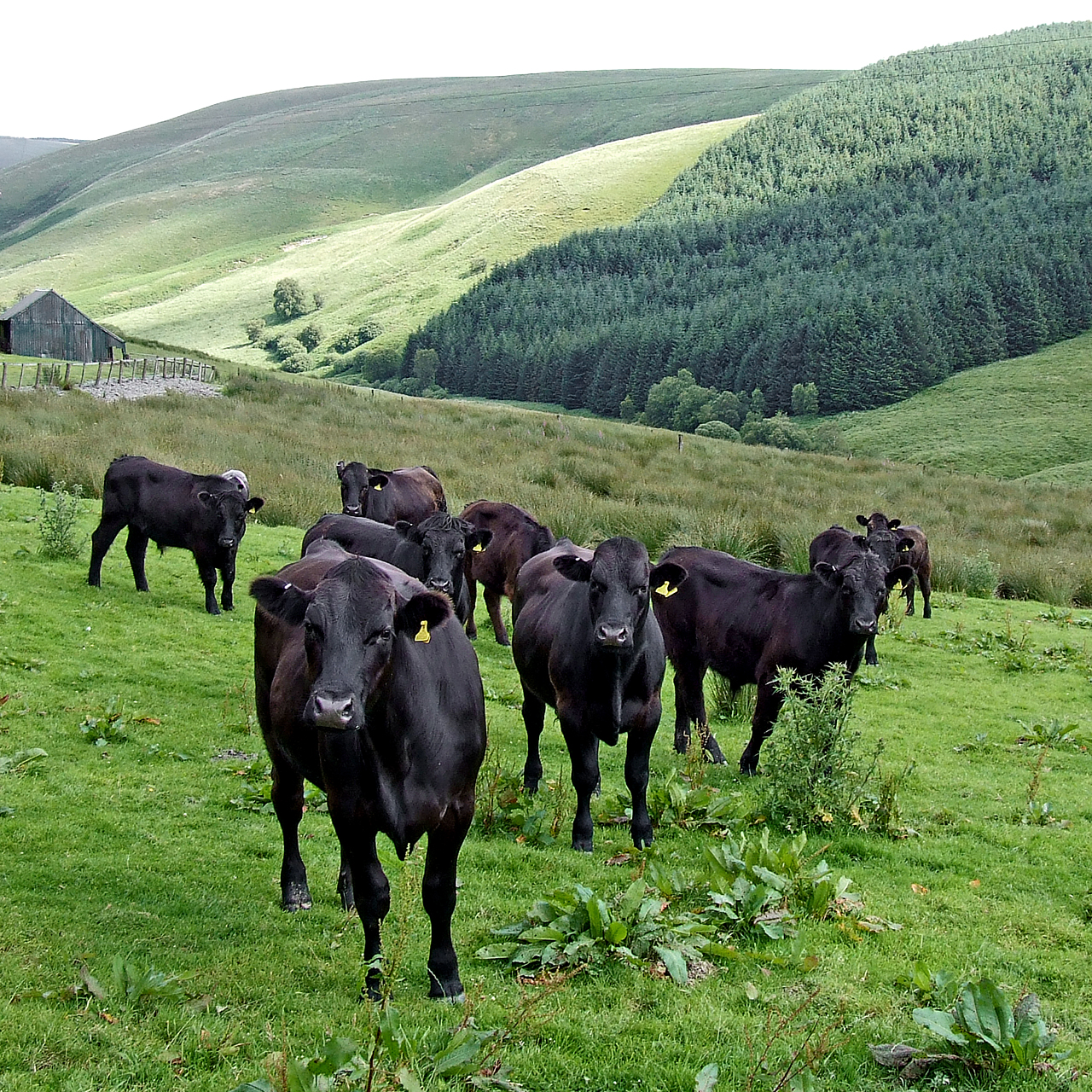
Welsh Black cattle at Cwm Doethie – Mynydd Mallaen (photo by Roger Kidd)

Many local farms are family run, such as Golwg y Môr, and regularly supply local restaurants and shops, with cattle grazing on the coastal grass which produces tender and well flavoured meat.

== Goat ==
Goat also remained a staple in Wales for much longer than in England. This is because goats were more suitable to the rugged Welsh terrain. Goat hams were often known in Wales as 'hung venison'. Although no longer popular, the antiquarian Thomas Pennant writes that in Wales 'hung venison' was a source of cheap and plentiful food during the winter months.

== Game ==
In Ceredigion, the estates that once formed part of notable Welsh country houses, such as the Trawsgoed Estate, near Aberystwyth, now offer wild shooting for a variety of game (hunting). The Trawsgoed Estate covers over 5,000 acres of marshes and wetland around Tregaron Bog (Cors Caron). Here game includes pheasant, snipe, mallard, Eurasian teal, wigeon and hares. The Monachty Shoot is a long established shoot on a 1500-acre estate near Aberaeron which includes pheasant and duck. Cefngwyn Hall, south of Aberystwyth offers semi-wild duck shooting with 25 pools in 400 acres

Pheasant is commercially reared and then released into the wild where it spends one or two seasons feeding on grain, berries, worms, grubs and roots. This diet can lead to the flesh acquiring a deep mellow flavour which is improved if it is hung for several days in a cool, airy place. Pressdee recommends eating pheasant with a very rich old Burgundy wine or Rhone wine and believes that the flavour of a semi-wild bird is better than the flavour of one reared and fed on commercial feed.

In Wales several venison farms have free-range deer and cull their animals when young and tender. Venison can be treated like beef, lamb or pork and many recipes include venison which has a rich flavour.

Rabbits are plentiful in Wales, especially along undisturbed open land and along the shoreline. The meat is tender and delicate and can be used in a variety of ways, including casseroles.

== Poultry ==
Most rural families traditionally kept geese or ducks. Geese would feed on the fields after the harvest had been gathered in order to help fatten them quickly. Welsh hill-farms used goose feathers for bedding, while large goose feathers would be used in the kitchen for sweeping the hearth. Smaller wing feathers would be used for brushing flour or oatmeal while baking. Goose meat was also used in cawl and Michaelmas Goose, or Gwydd Mihangel, is a recipe where the goose is boiled in water with a bowlful of chopped onions, salt and pepper and thickened with oatmeal. The thick fatty broth was popular during cold weather. Goose cawl also formed part of the feast given by a farmer to his tenants when they paid their rents.

== Vegetables ==
The potato has been a staple vegetable in Wales since its introduction and a number of interesting recipes have developed as a result. Potato Harvest Pudding (Poten Ben Fedi), for example, is a traditional Sunday supper dish made during late September and October, once the potato harvest had been collected and stored Another traditional dish is Roast Potatoes and Bacon (Tatws Rhost a Bacwm), which would be cooked in the pot oven (or ffwrn fach) over the fire until cooked. The combination of potatoes with bacon is a traditional one in Welsh cuisine, where the relative blandness of the potato is counter-balanced by the saltiness and fat of the bacon. If potato was not available, cabbage would take the place of potatoes to give a Bacon and Cabbage dish (Cig Moch a Chabaits), with the cabbage being cooked in the liquor of the bacon or a boiling ham.

Although leeks are closely connected with Wales, Freeman notes that there are few recipes specifically made for them. At one time they were the only member of the onion family that grew throughout Wales and thus merited a mention in the Laws of Hywel Dda, together with the cabbage. One notable dish is Pastai Cennin (Leek pasty) which combines leeks with a shortcrust pastry.

Cawl is a soup or broth that was an important dish throughout Wales and would traditionally be eaten with a special cawl-spoon. This was made of wood to avoid burning the mouth on the hot broth. Traditionally, the broth of the cawl would be drunk first and the meat and vegetables eaten second. This is similar to the French dish pot-au-feu, which cawl closely resembles. These days cawl is eaten all at once, although the use of a hand-carved wooden cawl spoon and a wooden bowl may be less common than before. Traditionally, cawl is accompanied by nothing more than a hunk of wholemeal bread and a chunk of cheese

There is no standard cawl recipe, but in New Quay it was traditionally made on the beach on the first day of August as a special feast for the sailors of the village. One woman would oversee the making of the cawl in a large cauldron, while each family would contribute its portion of the ingredients - either a piece of beef or fresh garden vegetables. Because of the variety of vegetables available during the summer, cawl was considered to be at its best during this time of year and was known as Cawl Awst.

Tregaron has its own cawl recipe, known as Tregaron Broth (Cawl Mamgu Tregaron). This is made from meat and vegetables boiled in water, except for the leeks, which are added later. The vegetables usually include parsnip, potatoes, carrots, swede, and white cabbage while the meat includes bacon and shin beef (beef shank). The ingredients are boiled together with oatmeal to thicken and left simmering for as long as required. The leek is added 10 minutes before serving and the cawl is left to boil. Cawl is a key part of traditional Welsh cuisine and Bobby Freeman noted that it forms "an unspoken part of life" in Wales.

== Dairy products ==
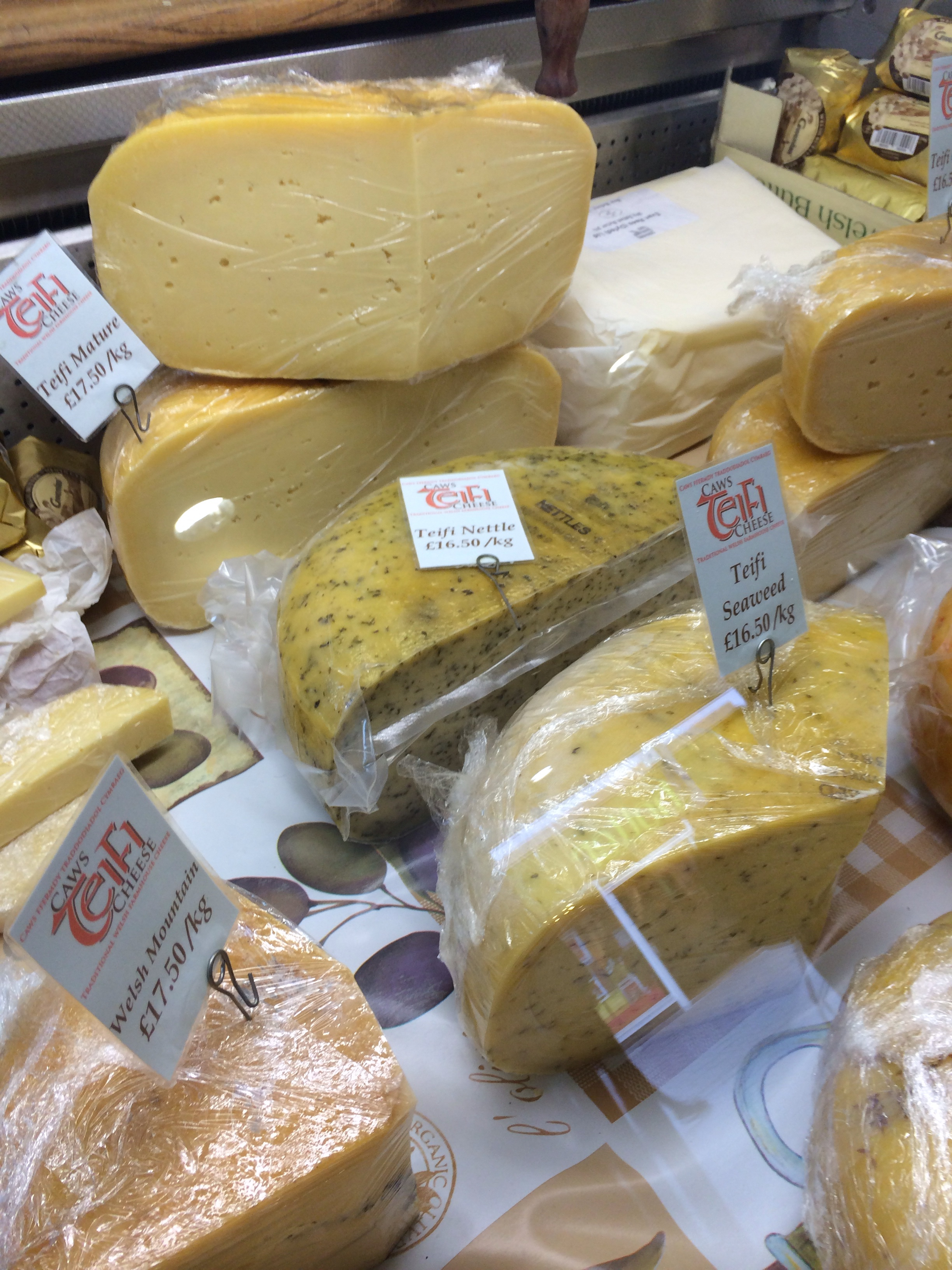
Teifi cheeses

Ceredigion is noted for dairy produce which is due to the quality of its pasture. In the past, milk would be sent daily to London to "quench the capital's thirst". As a result, Ceredigion also has an important dairy industry and, in addition to milk, is noted for its cheese and yoghurt.

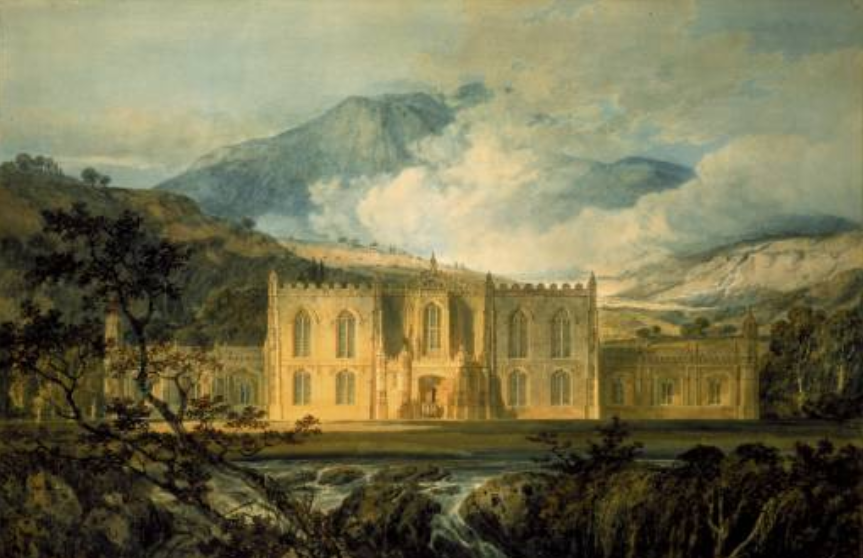
Hafod House, a painting by J. M. W. Turner. In 1800 the experimental farm established by Thomas Johnes at his estate at Hafod Uchtryd produced four tons of cheese, including Parmesan, Stilton, Cheshire and Gloucestershire varieties, and 550kg of butter from 40 cows imported from the Netherlands.

Gilli Davies notes that, in Wales, the system of transhumance meant that cheese production remained a farmhouse activity for longer than elsewhere in Britain. During the summer, butter and cheese making would form part of the economy of the hafod, the summer dwelling-place of the Welsh farmer (see Agriculture in Wales). The hafod would be located up in the hills, where the livestock would make the best of the summer grazing. However, the acid soils of the uplands (highland) mean that hard cheeses are less easy to produce and traditionally the drovers, who would take the sheep on foot to market in England, would often barter sheep for a hard cheese, usually Cheddar cheese, in order to make their 'caws pobi' or Welsh rabbit.

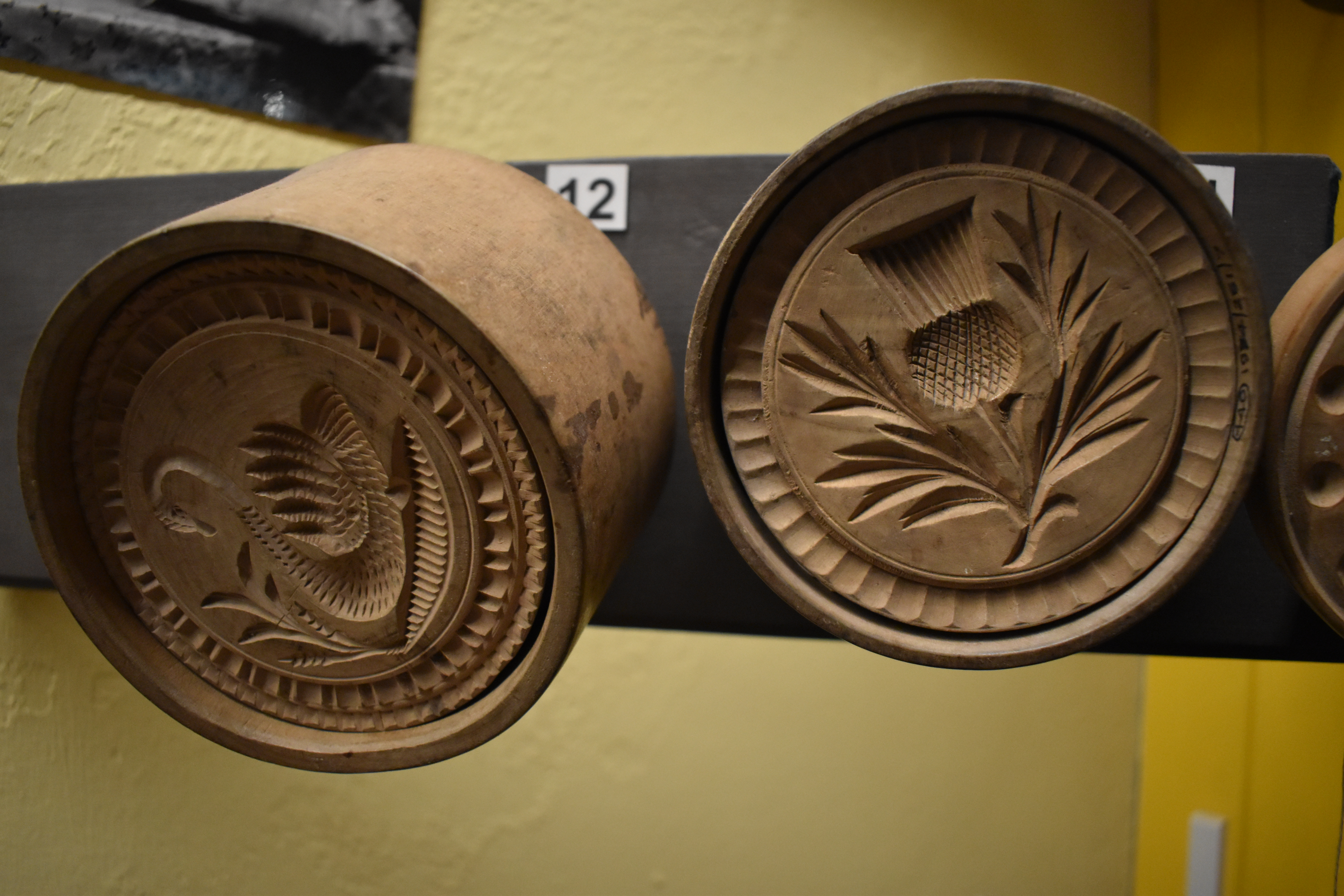
Carved butter stamps at Ceredigion Museum (photo by Jopparn)

During the twentieth century there was a renaissance in cheese making in Ceredigion. Ty'n Grug is a farm-based cheese producer and is considered to be the 'uncle' of organic cheeses in Wales. It makes cheese from cow, goat and ewe milk and varieties include Teifi, Penbryn and Felin Gernos (from cows' milk), Merlin (from goats' milk) and Acorn (from ewes' milk). The proprietor, Dougall Campbell, was born in Sydney and moved to Ceredigion in 1976. He became a pioneering figure in the world of Welsh cheese production and is considered to have led the "renaissance in farmhouse cheese-making". By 1984 the few organic dairy farms in Ceredigion sold their milk to the Milk Marketing Board but without any premium for their organic produce. Campbell established Welsh Organic Foods to support organic milk producers, capitalising on the organic provenance of the milk and turning it into the first organic-cheese making company in Britain. He also helped educate the public on the nature and benefits of organic cheese. The Soil Association has since established the Dougal Campbell Memorial Fund in his honour while The Specialist Cheesemakers Association offers a bursary, known as the Dougal Campbell Cheese Award, for aspiring cheese makers. (Independent obituary)

Tyn-y-Llwyn is farm-based cheese producer located at Pontrhydygroes. The farm produces a firm Cheddar-type cheese and has been in production since 1986. Flocks of Anglo-Nubian goat, the Alpine goat and Saanen goat breeds provide milk for the cheese.

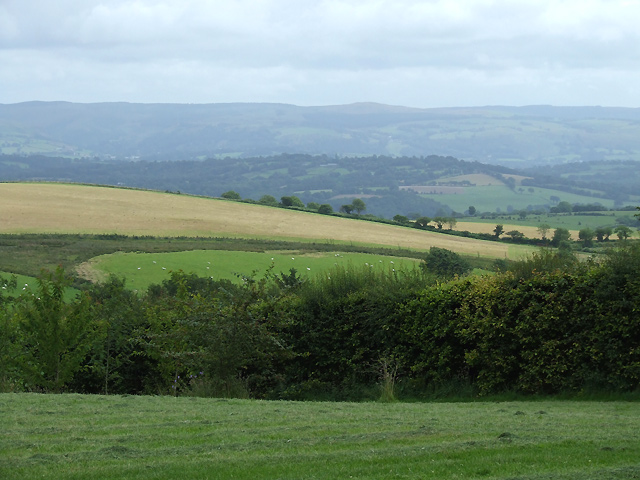
farmland south of Penuwch

Little Acorn Products was established in 1985 at a time when cheese made from ewes milk was a rarity. The business was started from the kitchen table of Karen and Don Ross, who started by making one cheese a day and recorded the production process in detail. Their ewes' milk cheese resembles an old fashioned Wensleydale. In addition, they make cheeses from cows milk, including a variety called Monks of Strata Florida, named after a famous local monastery.

Penbryn Organic Farmhouse Cheese is made by Paul Knifton and Andrea Degen, who previously made Gouda cheese in Ireland and Holland respectively. The cheese moulds are filled with curd and wrapped individually by hand and stored for 8–10 months to enhance the flavour to give a traditional taste. Varieties include a Penbryn Mature cheese. Gilli Davies comments that they "produce some of the best cheese produced in Wales today". Teifi Farmhouse Cheese is made at Ffostrasol, Llandysul and is considered to be one of the finest farmhouse cheeses made in Wales.

Rachel's Organic was established by Rachel Rowland at Brynllys Farm; a 254-acre organic farm in Dolybont, near Borth, that has been owned by four generations of the same family. In 1982, a snow storm prevented access to the farm so, in order not to waste the farm's milk, they made butter for local consumption. Production of butter, yoghurt and cheese soon followed. Rachel's grandmother was a dairy instructor at UCW, Aberystwyth, and was responsible for developing organic methods using scientific principles.

== Bread, cakes and puddings ==
Organic wheat is still stone-ground in small flour mills across Wales. The slow grinding of the flour retains the wheat germ in its entirety while the warm, but not hot, friction between the mill stones gently releases the wheat oil and thus retains all the nutrients. In Ceredigion, Felin Ganol, at Llanrhystud, is an example of a restored flour mill that retains its original machinery. It is the only working water-powered mill in Ceredigion and was visited by the Prince of Wales in 2012.

Bread and cakes were made for daily use and also for special occasions, which usually revolved around the religious or agricultural calendar. Freeman notes that cakes come from the later tradition in Welsh cookery, when the bakestone was replaced by the oven. Sheep shearing remains one of the major social occasions in Welsh rural life and during this period farmers help each other with the rounding-up of the sheep and the shearing of the wool. At this time the host farm will spend days beforehand making pies, cakes and baked meats. Cacen Gneifo, or Shearing Cake, is a traditional cake made at this time, which is flavoured with caraway seeds. The Threshing Cake, or Cacen Ddyrnu, is a traditional cake made at threshing time and uses buttermilk and bacon fat, which are always available on Welsh farms. Teisen Carawe, or Seed Cake, is another cake using caraway seeds. It is one of the oldest of the Welsh egg-raised cakes and is traditionally associated with chapel and Sunday tea in the parlour. An old Ceredigion recipe is Christmas Cake, or Teisen Ddu Nadolig, which typically includes some home brewed ale.

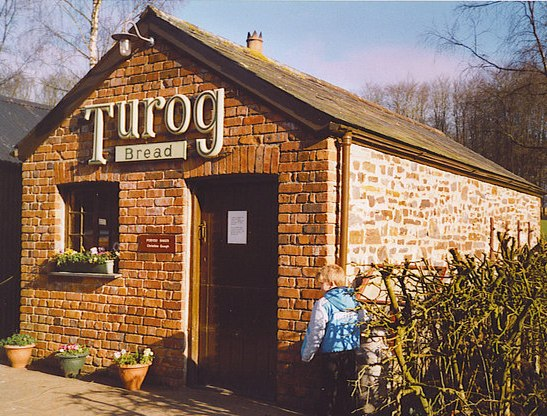
The Derwen Bakehouse, National Museum of History, built of bricks in 1900, this was a communal bakehouse in Thespian Street, Aberystwyth until 1924. Today, Bara Brith is baked here for sale to visitors

Commercial bakeries developed in urban areas during the nineteenth and early twentieth century to satisfy the need of urban dwellers to bake their own bread. They would bring their home-prepared dough to the bakery in baking tins and would pay the baker for baking it. The reason for this is that town houses were fitted with iron ovens attached to kitchen ranges which were not regarded as 'good bakers of bread'. The Derwen Bakehouse was one of three such bakeries in Aberystwyth. It served the local community from around 1900 to 1924 and was re-erected in the National Museum of History during the mid-1980s. It is a functional bakery that allows visitors to the Museum to see bakers at work using traditional wooden appliances, mixing dough and using the large brick oven in the traditional way.

Pancakes, which are called poncagen (poncagau) or pancosen (pancos) in Ceredigion, are considered to be as traditional in Wales as cawl; they could be quickly made on the bakestone over the fire and would often be made for unexpected visitors, as a birthday treat or eaten at high tea. Pancakes still remain popular and are considered best made with buttermilk and bicarbonate of soda, rather than ordinary milk. Most recipe books from Welsh country houses include pancake recipes that use cream, which would be considered a special luxury.

Waffles are a more recent addition to Ceredigion cuisine, with local production commencing in the 1980s. Tregroes Waffles is run by Kees Huysmans and Ans Brouwer who arrived in Ceredigion in 1981 from Holland. They started with a simple waffle iron offering their first waffles at a Guy Fawkes party at Henllan in 1984 and have since moved to larger premises in Llandysul.

Trifle and rice pudding remain very popular in west Wales, with Freeman commenting that trifle is the "more or less obligatory 'finale' to a special occasion feast". In the case of rice pudding, this is expected to be rich and creamy.

In 2012 the Ceredigion Federation of Women’s Institutes published a book of recipes called “Cardi Cuisine” to celebrate their 90th anniversary and the hosting of the WI Wales Conference at Aberystwyth. The spiral bound book contained over 90 recipes from WI members, including some traditional bread and cake recipes, including recipes for Parsnip Bread, Bara Brith, Shearing Cake, Welsh Cakes, Llanddarog Fair Cakes and Welsh Tea Buns.

== Fruit ==
Fruit growing tends to be for household use, with each farm having its own apple, plum or damson tree. However, due to the acid soil in upland areas, soft fruit is a rarity, although it may be grown on a commercial basis where the soil is less acid. Pen Called is a traditional apple variety from Ceredigion which is a good variety for cider production. It has a full, sharp taste and is low in tannin. It can also be used as a late-season cooking apple. Pren Glas is an apple variety from the St Dogmaels area. It is an early-season eating apple. Both apples are available from commercial growers. Like elsewhere in the country, Welsh apples and fruit varieties may await rediscovery and a full assessment of traditional Welsh horticultural biodiversity remains to be undertaken.

Wild fruit is also collected, including blackberry (mwyar), whinberry (llus), wild raspberry (afan) and wild cranberry, which can be found growing in the boggier uplands of Ceredigion. Gooseberry and rhubarb are also commonly grown in gardens.

Fruit tarts, including turnover tarts, were traditionally made on the bakestone without a plate or dish; sugar was only added after the fruit was cooked. This was done by lifting off the pastry lid and then working the sugar into the fruit. Making a tart on the bakestone required skill and the use of a special wooden slice.

== Organic produce ==
Ceredigion farming traditions go back generations, but the influence of alternative lifestyles has added new ideas and philosophies to traditional ways of life and thus enriched the local community. This means that, in addition to traditional Welsh staples, such as butter and bacon, new foods such as pulses, beans and soya milk have supplemented the diet. In addition, there has been a move away from artificially fertilized farm land to organic pasture, together with a growth in horticulture and an increase in the production of high-quality produce.

== Drinks ==
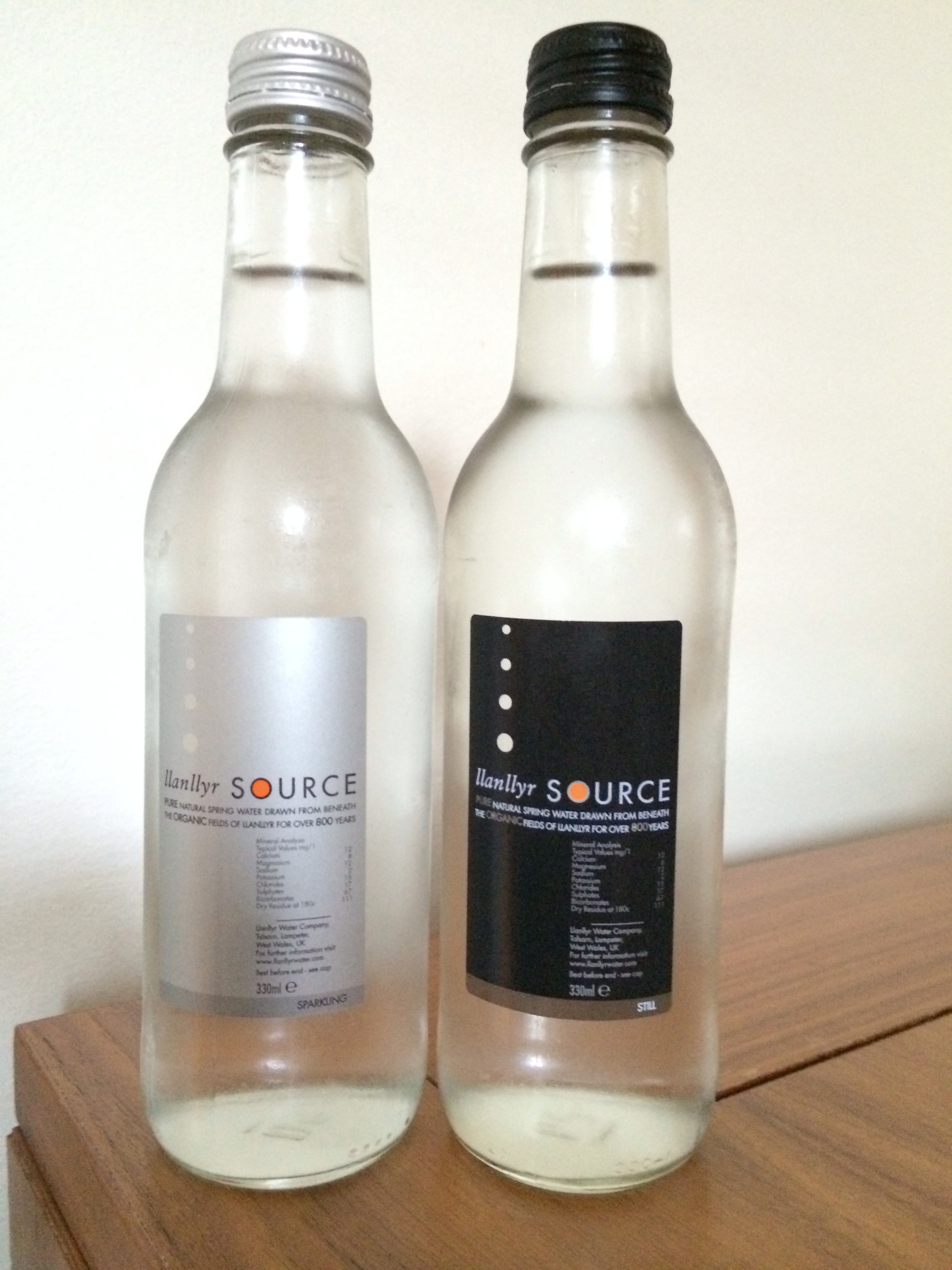
Llanllyr mineral water

Dà Mhìle Distillery is an independent Welsh whiskey distillery established in 2012 with help from the Springbank Distillery. It is based at Glynhynod Farm and is reputed to be the first organic, farmhouse distillery in the UK. The distillery produces organic whiskey and offers guided tours by arrangement. It also produces an organic orange liqueur called Dà Mhile Orange 33.

Freeman notes that home-brewed beer is "a legend" in rural Wales, with family recipes being jealously guarded. One farm that now produces beer commercially is Panteg Farm, at Maen-y-groes where Penlon Cottage Brewery offer beer tastings and events. They produce ten types of ales, lagers and stouts using traditional methods and vegetarian recipes.

Celtic Country Wines, is located at Henllan, Llandysul and produces fruit wines, liqueurs and country preserves. The winery accepts visitors and has a gift shop.

Traditionally, ginger beer has always been popular as a non-alcoholic alternative to ordinary beer. There are two kinds of Welsh ginger beer, one uses a gingered herb to make 'small' beer and the other uses root ginger.

Tŷ Nant is a 350 year old farm near Bethania, Ceredigion. The farm has bottled spring water since 1986. The Tŷ Nant brand was established in 1989 and is recognised by its distinctive cobalt blue, glass bottles which won a British Glass Federation design award and were the first bottles to use dark blue glass since Phillip's Milk of Magnesia. Llanllyr is a bottled water which has been drawn since 1180 at an organic farm in Talsarn, and is available throughout Wales.

== See also ==
- Welsh cuisine
- Cuisine of Carmarthenshire
- Cuisine of Gower
- Cuisine of Monmouthshire
- Cuisine of Pembrokeshire
- Cuisine of Swansea
- Cuisine of the Vale of Glamorgan
