= Cuisine of Monmouthshire =

Welsh regional cuisine

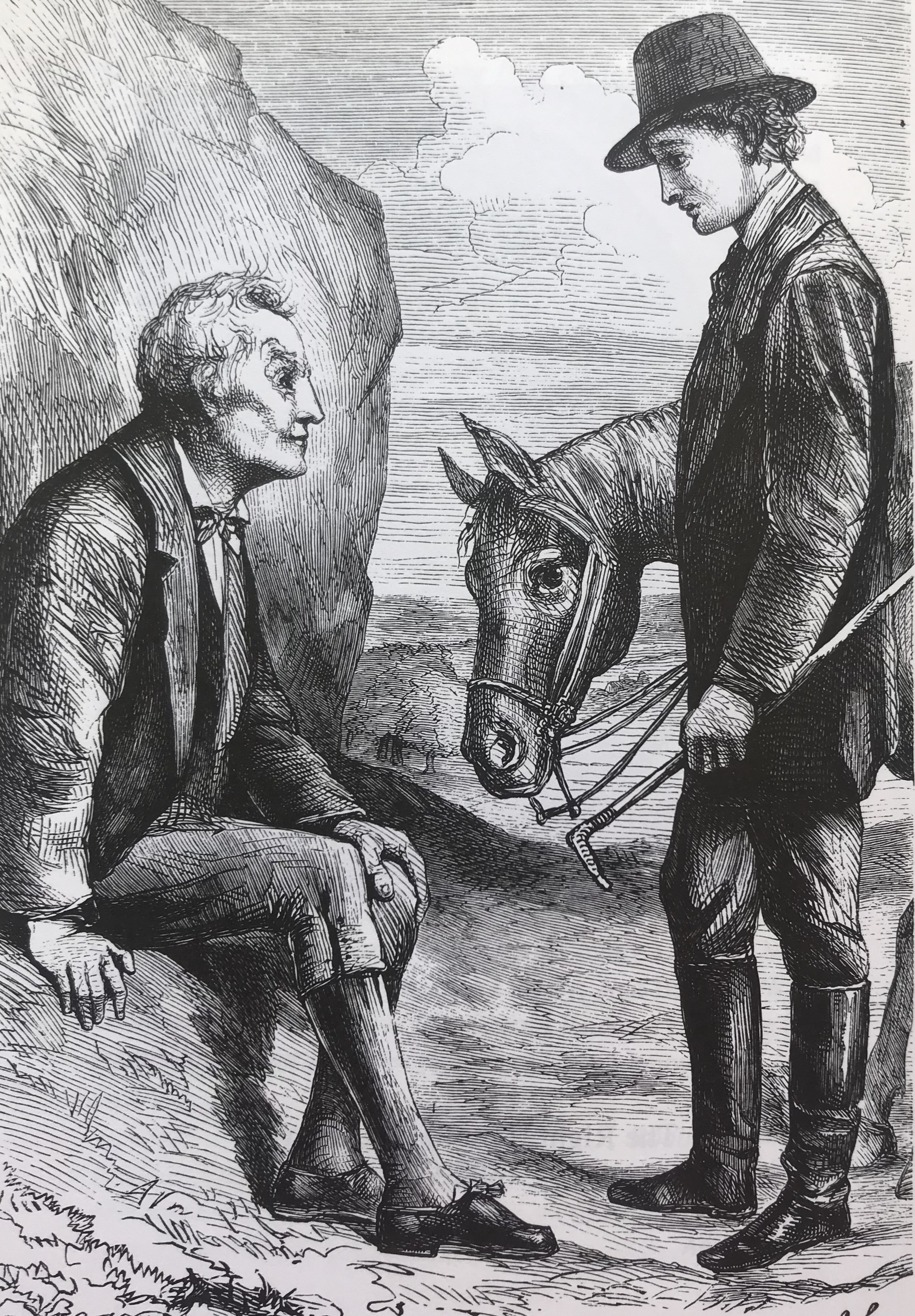
"The First Meeting of the Hermit and the Traveller", from the book The First Principles of Good Cookery by Lady Llanover, first published in 1867. The story of the meeting forms the basis of the cookery book.

Monmouthshire has three main agricultural areas. The central and eastern part of the county is made up of the large valleys of the rivers Severn, Wye, and Usk and the land in this part of the county is fertile and of good quality with gently undulating land suitable for market gardens and vineyards. The southern part of the county is bounded by the Bristol Channel and includes areas of moorland and marsh, such as Wentlooge and Caldicot. This area was once owned by the monks of Goldcliff Priory who drained the land and built seawalls to prevent the sea flooding the land. The northern and western part of the county is made up of uplands with shallow soils of low nutrient value which are suitable for hill farming. This area includes the valleys of the rivers Ebbw and Sirhowy to the west and the Black Mountains to the north.

Gilli Davies, the cook and author, notes that Monmouthshire has been successful in expanding the breadth of its food production into areas such as viticulture, horticulture and organic farming. In addition, food marketing initiatives have been created for specialist producers which have thrived, according to Davies, due to good transport links and the close proximity of the county to the markets of England. This helps in food distribution and in the development of a high-quality restaurant trade, with the latter having developed due to the efforts of some key individuals. Davies comments that there is "a rare and appealing quality to the food in Monmouthshire".

== Lady Llanover, "the Bee of Gwent" ==
The cuisine of Monmouthshire is historically associated with Augusta Hall, Lady Llanover, who published one of the first Welsh cookery books, First Principles of Good Cookery (1867). The book uses a fictional Welsh hermit to give culinary advice to a visiting guest who is travelling though Wales. The book's historical significance was noted by Bobby Freeman who, in 1991, arranged for the book to be republished by the Brefi Press together with an introduction explaining its historical significance and the background of Lady Llanover's life. Lady Llanover championed Welsh cuisine in the kitchens of her home at Llanover House and during her lifetime was famous for her hospitality, where the following motto hung above the dining room:

Da i bawb cynhildeb yw
A thad i gyfoeth ydyw
Thrift is beneficial to all
And is the father of wealth

Gilli Davies, the cook and author, notes that although some of the recipes in First Principles of Good Cookery may have a Welsh origin, others originated from Lincolnshire where Lady Llanover was brought up.

== Meat ==
Lamb and mutton is a popular ingredient for stews, broths and casseroles and is produced by the hill farms in the north of Monmouthshire. It has been a popular dish in local hotels and inns since the start of tourism in the county.

Wirt Sikes, an American journalist and writer known for his writings on Welsh folklore and customs, toured Wales in the 1880s and wrote a book of his travels called Rambles and Studies in Old South Wales. On his visit to Monmouthshire he commented on the quality of its lamb, noting that the chop of lamb served at the Old Croft Inn at Caerleon were "done to a turn... with the true Welsh tenderness and juice..." However, at The Beaufort Arms in Monmouth, Sikes commented on the ubiquity of this staple on the restaurant menu as follows:

"the resources of the inn, when tested to their utmost, will produce at the last, and inevitably, chops - neither more nor less. What can you give me inside half an hour?" I ask. "Anything you like, sir" the woman answers with unblushing effrontery, and a respectful cordiality delightful to see in such a connexion, I am tempted to ask for buckwheat cakes, prairie chicken, roast saddlerocks, and watermelons, but compromise with "How about a fowl?" "Fowl, sir? - take about an hour to cook a fowl, sir." But it is idle to defer the climax of this thrilling - or grilling - tale, I had chops for dinner."

Franco Taruschio comments that Welsh lamb has the potential to be a perennial feature on a restaurant menu because lowland lamb is available in early spring, upland lamb is available in summer and mountain lamb is available from late summer to late autumn. He notes that mountain lamb is born out of doors and feeds off grass and herbs.

Up until the Victorian era, Welsh Mutton Hams were part of Welsh daily fare. Freeman mentions that the old mutton recipes from Wales "make one's mouth water and one's spirits fray with frustration" and suggests that some of the recipes may be worth adapting to Welsh lamb dishes.

In Lady Llanover's book, an anonymous traveller dines with a hermit and comments on Welsh mutton as follows:

"Although real Welsh mutton was admitted by all epicures, and by medical men, to be the very finest for flavour, and the lightest of digestion of all the breeds of sheep known in Great Britain, very few prizes were ever given for the encouragement and preservation of so invaluable a breed of animals"

However, the Traveller, like Sikes, found that not every Victorian tourist inn produced a tasty chop:

"..even at Welsh inns, during his last absence, he had been sickened by large coarse mutton, though within a mile of mountains, where the best Welsh sheep were to be had, and could alone live and flourish. He added that, at private houses, the same complaint may often be made in Wales as well as in London, from whence the rich, nevertheless, send abroad for all sorts of foreign luxuries for their table, on which the best Welsh mutton is seldom ever found"

Llanover's book attempts to right this wrong with various recipes, including one for Boiled Shoulder of Mutton. This requires the mutton to be boiled for two and a half hours together with onions, celery, marjoram and a small sprig of thyme. There is also a recipe for Welsh Lamb Pie, where the bones from a neck of lamb are cooked together with vegetables and left overnight. Pastry for the pie is made the following day, the meat and vegetables are then added and, after the pie has been baked, the melted jelly from the meat is included.

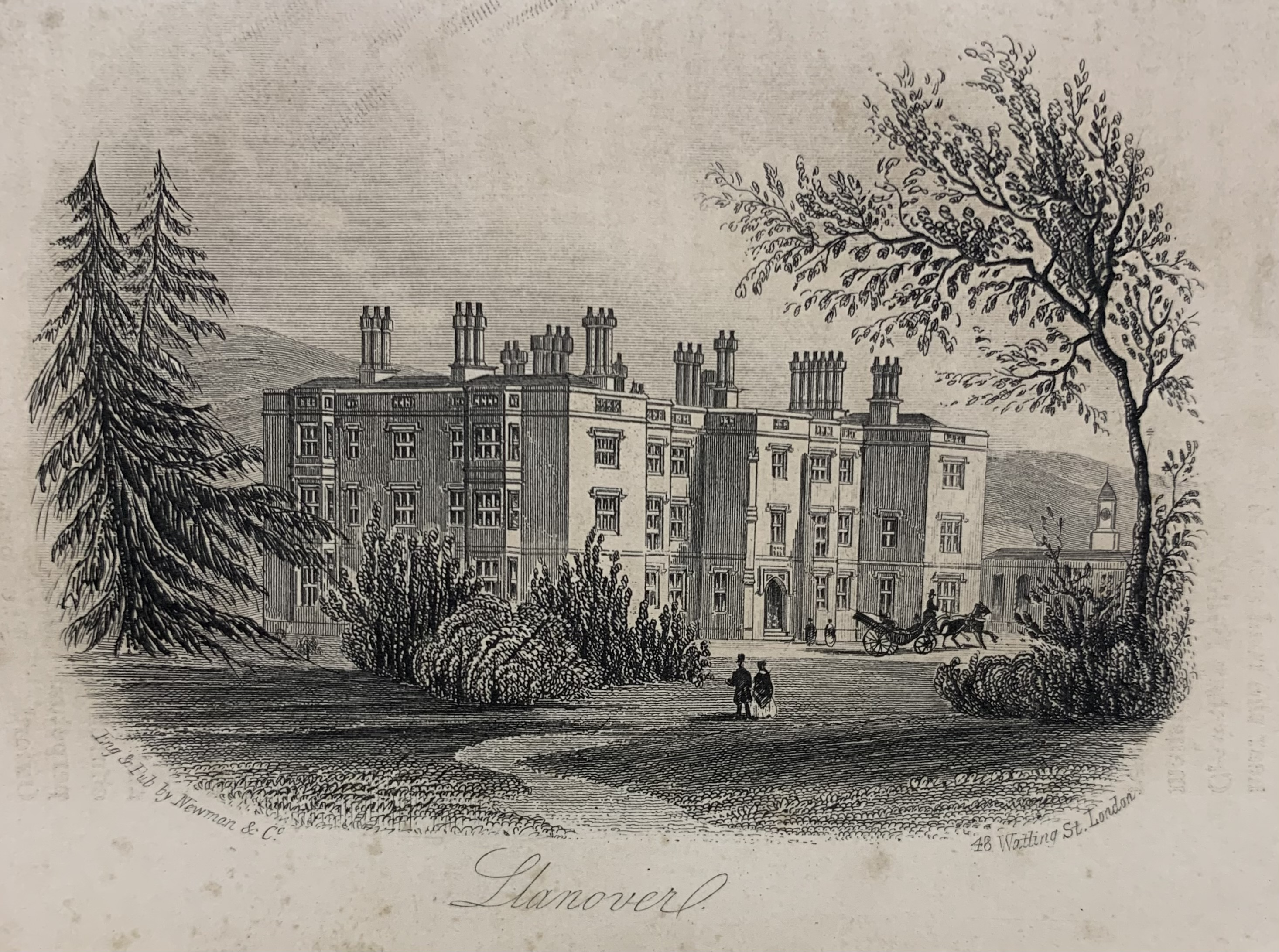
Llanover House, home of Lady Llanover

Annette Yates recommends a recipe for Welsh Mountain Lamb with Honey, Rosemary and Cider (Cig Oen gyda Mel, Rhosmari a Seidr), noting that lamb with honey and rosemary is a traditional combination to which cider can be added. The dish is cooked until the lamb is soft. Yates comments that the juice from the lamb is sweet and this becomes caramelized and golden, due to the honey. Yates notes that several cider producers are concentrated in this part of Wales.

Monmouthshire Broth is a local recipe that includes neck of lamb. The neck is left simmering in a saucepan for two hours together with chopped onions and sliced carrots. Potatoes are added half an hour before serving and, when ready, chopped parsley is sprinkled on top as a garnish. Monmouth Stew (Stiw Mynwy) is a lamb stew which includes leeks and pearl barley. Parsley, thyme, and a bay leaf are added for seasoning.

In her cookery book Welsh Country Puddings and Pies, Freeman notes that Anne Hughes, who worked a successful farm on the Welsh Marches near Chepstow, would make a May Day Pie containing meat and fruit. Hughes made her May Day Pie for her farm workers and in order to be 'reddie for who shall cum amaying tomorrow, it being maye day'. May Day Pies were made like a Cornish pastie, with a mixture of cooked meat (probably mutton or lamb) finely chopped apples, pears, onions, lemon thyme, rosemary, pepper and salt. Anne Hughes kept a diary and, during the year 1796, she wrote an account of the daily life on the farm, including some of her favourite recipes.

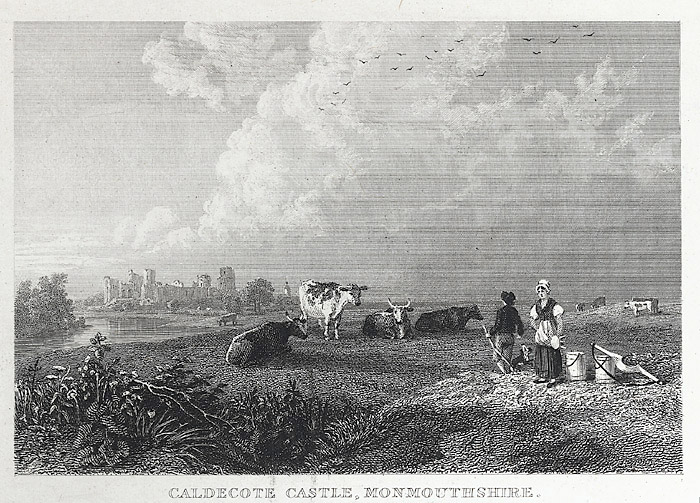
Cattle resting in front of Caldicot Castle

Cattle have been an important component of Welsh agriculture since Roman times. Welsh Black cattle is a traditional breed known for the flavour of its meat and the natural marbling of the flesh. Amanda Wragge includes this meat in her recipe for a Black Beef Burger which includes egg and breadcrumbs, with ginger and cumin added for piquancy. Although Welsh Black cattle is a popular breed in Wales it only represents about 2% of the country's beef output, with other breeds including Aberdeen Angus, Hereford, Holstein Friesian, Charolias, Red Poll, Jersey, Guernsey, and Limousin. Traditional butchers can be found in the county at Abergavenny, Raglan and Monmouth.

Pork has been part of the diet in Wales since early times with the pig being mentioned in the Laws of Hywel Dda. Until recently, almost every family living in the countryside would keep a pig and they would often be left to feed on waste ground and in woodlands. In The First Principles of Good Cookery, Lady Llanover provides detailed instructions for curing ham. In Welsh Calendar Cookbook, Davies refers to a recipe for Braised Monmouthshire Pork with Savoury Welsh Cakes, where the Welsh Cakes are used to garnish the pork.

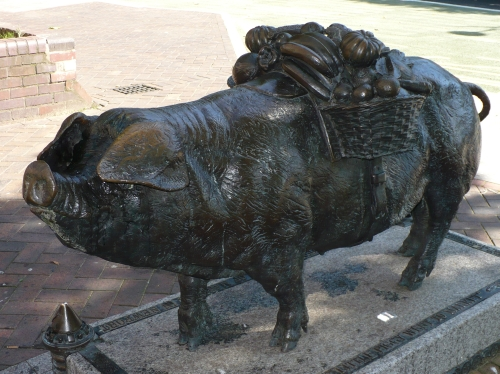
Statue of a Gloucester Old Spots Pig outside Newport Provisions Market, carrying baskets of fruit and vegetables, erected to celebrate over 700 years of markets in Newport, unveiled in 1994 by Cllr Ted Travers, who was then mayor of Newport, and made by Sebastian Boyesen, Newport's town sculptor at the time. (photo by Robin Drayton)

Goat meat remained popular in Wales long after it ceased to be eaten in England. Goat hams were called 'hung venison' and in early medieval times they were eaten in place of bacon. Thomas Pennant noted that young goats, known as kids, were "a cheap and plentiful provision in the winter months" in Wales. In the past, goat meat was considered inferior to venison and was known as 'hung venison' or 'rock venison'. However, Freeman notes that the best goat is sweet and fat and makes an excellent pasty. Taruschio writes of a recipe for Kid with Orange, Marsala and Coriander, he comments:

"We always have kid on the menu in the spring. So many people nearby have goats either for their milk or for their wool. If they have too many billies we have them….Kid meat is a sweet tender meat with hardly any fat."

== Poultry and game ==
Poultry remains an important part of Monmouthshire food production with turkey, chicken and duck being bred organically on some farms

Llanover's book contains a recipe for Welsh Salt Duck which is considered by Freeman to be "a most successful and unusual dish", while Yates comments that this recipe is probably the most celebrated duck dish in Wales. The recipe involves salting a whole duck for three days before cooking it. Freeman notes that Welsh Salt Duck is a dish exclusive to Wales but mentions that it is not known if the duck was salted in order to tenderize an older bird, or in order to make it keep for longer." Freeman notes that Welsh Salt Duck appears to have been confined to the Welsh Marches and comments that it is a delicious dish which is very little understood. She writes that the duck meat is tender and delicately salted but remains low in fat because the fat is removed when the water is drained from the pan. Freeman suggests that this water, which forms a stock, can be saved and used as a base for a lentil soup, while the duck is eaten either with a Laverbread Sauce or cold with a salad, either a Green Salad or an Orange and Watercress Salad. Yates comments that slices of cold Welsh Salt Duck were often served with a sharp-tasting fruit sauce made from damson, plum or bilberry. When Freeman arranged for the re-publication of Llanover's book, in 1991, she asked Taruschio if he could base a restaurant menu around the recipes in the book. With the help of Elizabeth David, Taruschio created a menu based on a main course of Welsh Salt Duck.

Llanover's book also has a recipe for The Hermit's Chicken and Leek Pie. However, Freeman believes this recipe does not originate from the ancient tradition of Welsh cookery but was probably from a later tradition, probably being a dish made by the wives of well-to-do yeomen. Maesmawr Farm, which specialises in poultry farming and which is located at Glascoed, has its own recipe for Turkey and Leek Pie. Davies includes the recipe in her book and mentions that it includes chopped turkey, ham, leeks and watercress. The leeks are sliced and cooked with butter until soft and a stock of flour, cream and wine is added. After simmering the mix is then poured into a pie dish together with mustard, grated lemon peel, grated cheese and lemon juice, it is then covered with pastry and baked until golden brown.

Game is also plentiful in Monmouthshire, and includes teal, woodcock, partridge, hare, rabbit and venison. Taruschio comments:

"When the game season starts with red grouse on 12 August, it always brings a sense of excitement. This must be because one never knows what is going to arrive from the shoots. Game is plentiful around here; ….Pheasants are so abundant one can see them in almost every field."

Taruschio has a recipe for Guineafowl Cooked in Clay. He mentions finding a seam of clay during the mid-1960s on a building site and using this to cook the fowl, explaining that it is a very old method of cooking. He emphasises that the thickness of the clay needs to be the same all around the fowl, with no holes or weak spots, in order for the fowl to cook evenly.

== Fish ==
Monmouthshire once had important Roman settlements (see: Wales in the Roman era). cockle and oyster, were popular shellfish eaten during this period, with some excavated Roman sites having revealed vast quantities of shells. However, once the Romans retreated from Wales fish was less popular because, according to Freeman, Celtic Christianity associated fish with paganism and the goddess Venus.

The rivers Severn, Wye and Usk are well known for their salmon and trout. Davies nuotes that the Wye is considered to be the most important river for salmon in England and Wales and is one of the most productive stretches of river in Britain. During the 1980s the catch by fishing rod on the Wye was approximately 8,000 fish per season, excluding commercial fishing in the estuary. However, since then the rod catch has declined to about a quarter of that level. Tourism from fishing contributes considerably to the local economy with hotels and restaurants catering for recreational fishing throughout the season.

On the Severn, records indicate that large quantities of salmon were traditionally caught by net and by fish trap during the nineteenth century, with 22,500 fish caught in 1870, 30,000 in 1883 and 20,950 in 1902. However, by the twentieth century the numbers recorded had reduced to 15,500 in 1919 and had further reduced to 5,127 in 1959.

On the Severn putcher fishing, using removable basket traps, was once widely used along the Monmouthshire and Gloucestershire banks of the Severn. They were still used at Lower Porton and Goldcliff well into the 20th century, but the fishery at Goldcliff was one of the last to cease operation in 1995. At Goldcliff the fish were collected and placed in a tight-lidded, lead-lined wooden chest filled with broken ice and the chests were then sent by rail to Billingsgate.

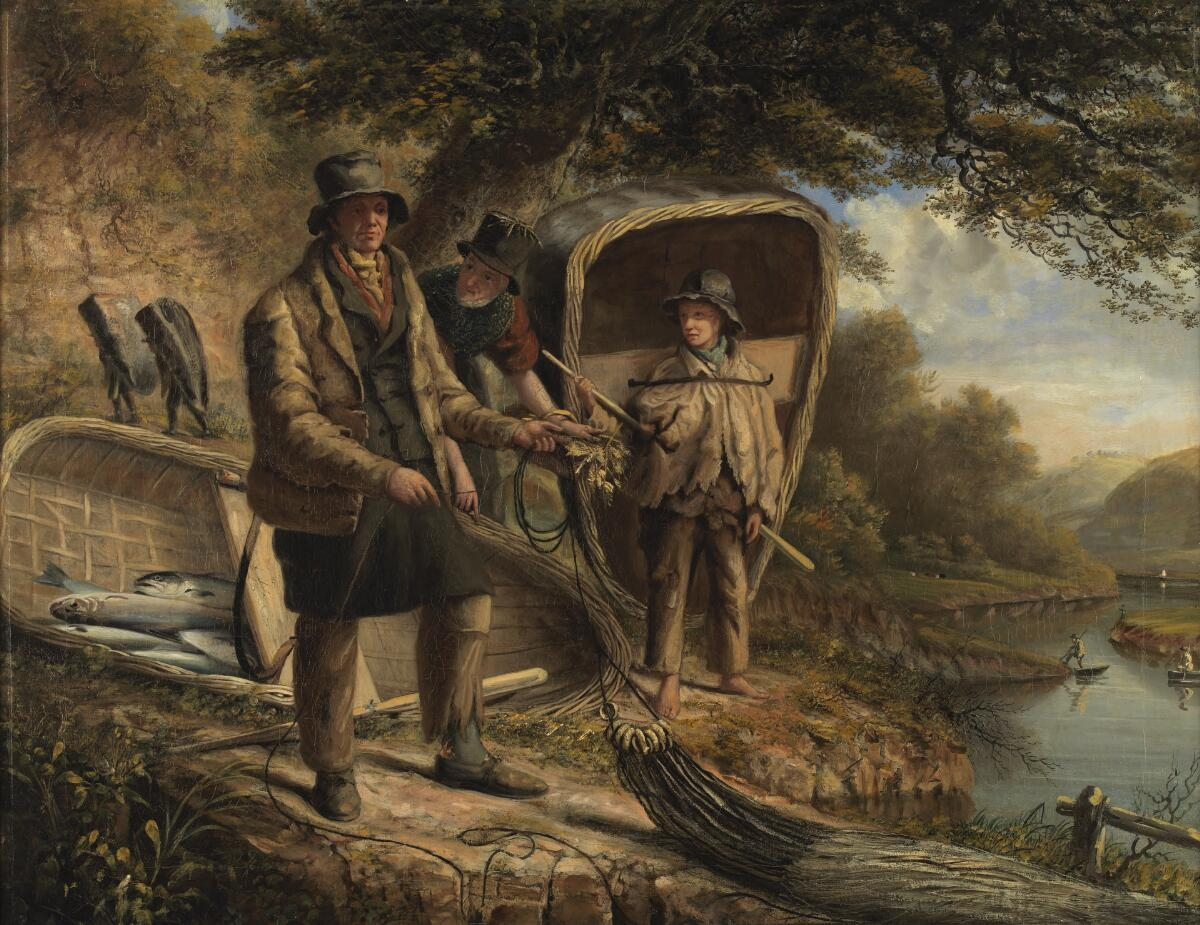
Salmon netting in Wales, a painting by Hugh Hughes (1790–1863) from the art collection at the National Library of Wales.

The form of basket known as a putt was less commonly used, with the last putt weirs at Goldcliff being abandoned in the 1920s because they required much greater skill in basket weaving due to their larger size. Putts were only used on the Severn estuary and were made up of three sections, known as the kipe, butt and fore wheel. The baskets were made at Redwick and were designed to catch all kinds of fish from salmon to shrimps

The Severn Estuary and the estuaries of the Usk and Wye were also fished using lave nets. These are Y-shaped nets consisting of a handle and two arms from which the net is hung. Clenching nets are another type of net used on the Wye, these resemble a hand net which is hung at the end of a long pole. Stop-nets are another type of net which are used along the Severn and Wye from boats which are anchored to withstand the force of the tide. Coracle fishing also took place on the Severn, Usk and Wye but ended in the 1930s The coracle used on the Usk and Wye was known as the Monmouthshire truckle and was similar in design to the Tywi coracle. On the Severn, three types of coracle were used: the Ironbridge coracle, the Shrewsbury coracle and the Welshpool coracle. Drift netting and seine fishing also took place on the lower, wider stretches of these three rivers, where the current is stronger.

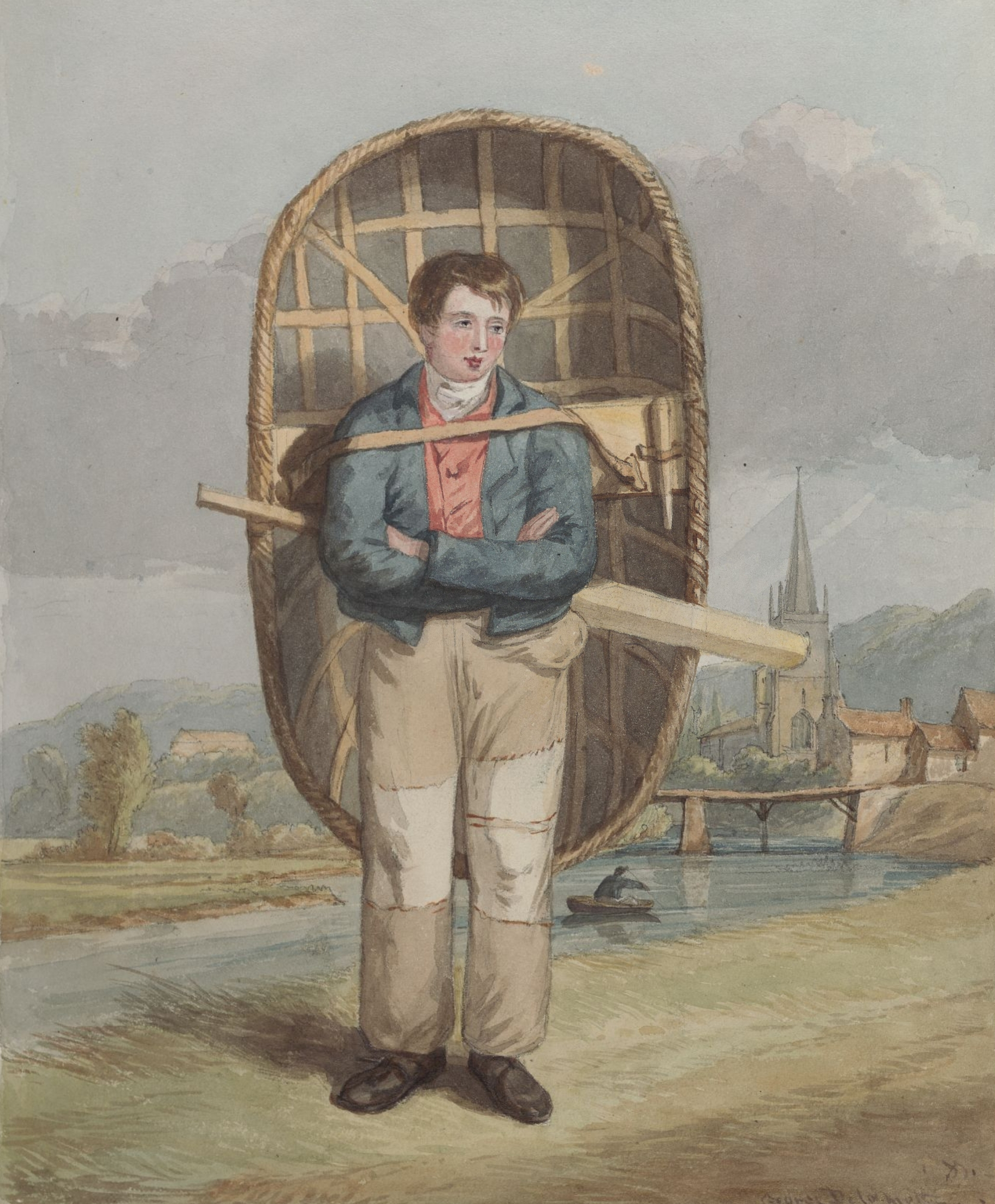
Boy with coracle, by George Orleans Delamotte from the art collection of the National Library of Wales

In Wales, poaching was the usual way to cook salmon, using milk to which a bay leaf was added. The salmon would then be served hot with parsley sauce, or left to cool and be eaten with bread and butter. Freeman comments that salmon poached in milk and eaten cold with cream can be considered as "an idea borrowed from the kitchens of Heaven!" Llanover explains, in her book on cookery, how to crimp salmon. This was a common practice in Victorian times in order to 'set' the flesh before the curd. The curd is the white substance which lies between the flakes of flesh and if it melts it can make the fish oily. Once crimped the salmon would be served with a strong sauce. Llanover recommended a Granville sauce, which Freeman considers to be an unusual type of sauce. The sauce is said to be named after Sir Richard Granville, an ancestor of Lady Llanover.

Sea trout (known as Sewin in Wales), trout and grayling are also caught in the rivers of Monmouthshire. Grayling is similar to trout with an excellent flavour but does not keep as well after it has been caught, so should be eaten as soon as possible. Grilled Grayling is one simple method of cooking this fish to which herbs can be added, such as chervil, chives, tarragon or parsley, along with butter, salt and pepper. Trout farms can be found in the county where farmed trout is sold, for example, at Crucorney Trout Farm.

Another important freshwater fish from Monmouthshire is the eel. Davies notes that fishing for young eels, known as elvers, along the Wye is an ancient tradition. The elvers are caught in special nets which are set in rows. Davies mentions that the nets are shaped like outsize lacrosse sticks. Fishing for elvers is a seasonal activity and depends on the phase of the moon. The eels breed in the Sargasso Sea and the elvers travel across the Atlantic Ocean to swim up Monmouthshire's rivers where they remain for most of their lives, returning to the Sargasso Sea to breed again when fully grown. The Wye is favoured by eels probably due to its tidal nature. As the eels swim alongside the river banks, on their journey inland, local fishermen scoop them out of the water with ancient-looking nets. Davies comments that the fishermen return each year to the same locations in order to scoop up the tiny eels as they move up the Wye.

Elvers are considered a delicacy and were caught in vast quantities every year in the lower Severn Valley as they entered the river with the Severn bore. According to Taylor, the coastline of the Bristol Channel forms a vast funnel meaning that far greater numbers of elvers enter the Severn than any other river in Britain and, as a result, elvers have been eaten as a delicacy in the districts bordering the tidal reaches of the lower Severn for many centuries. The traditional way of eating elvers in Wales is to cook or fry them in bacon fat for breakfast.

Fresh fish can be found on the menu of Monmouthshire restaurants, such as Smoked Sewin and Salmon terrine from The Crown at Whitebrook. In this dish thinly sliced layers of smoked Sewin are laid across the base and sides of a terrine, the salmon is poached in an onion and wine stock and is flaked and tossed with cucumber, carrot, lemon zest, herbs and the remaining sewin. This is used to fill the terrine and is then topped with a layer of quail eggs. The terrine is left to set in the fridge for 12 hours and is then served with dressed salad leaves and toast from whole wheat bread.

== Vegetables ==
Monmouthshire grows a wide range of fruit and vegetables, including mushrooms, tomatoes, leaf vegetables and winter root vegetables. The more sheltered valleys of the Usk and Wye have traditionally been used for growing wheat, potatoes, peas, beans and turnips while the east of the county has most of the arable land. To the north and north-west of the county, barley and oats form the principal crops. [The National Gazetteer of Great Britain and Ireland, 1868] Monmouthshire is also a significant producer of potatoes Market gardening is also an important aspect of Monmouthshire food production, particularly along the Wye valley and around Newport where fruit farms allow pick-your-own facilities for customers.

Taruschio mentions that his practice as a restaurateur was to use only local seasonal vegetables. With this policy, he found that each season would lead to different types of vegetables being incorporated into his menu. Purple broccoli and broad beans would be used in spring, zucchini (courgettes) in the summer, and pumpkins in the autumn. In winter parsnips would be chipped and after blanching and deep frying would be sprinkled with salt. The restaurant would obtain supplies from local producers who would personally deliver their vegetables to the restaurant. Foraging would also provide Taruschio with local wild mushrooms:

"We have three spots which have become firm favourites for our mushroom gathering forays, and each spot has a breath taking beauty. Our most prolific area is a wood in the Black Mountains. The terrain is difficult but the beauty of that wood and the baskets of porcini, chanterelles, pied-de-mouton and trompette de la mort more than compensate for the aching limbs and sore back. The smell of the birch trees, the vast variety of mosses, the sun slanting through the branches in little patches, the sound of the waterfalls gushing down to the brook below and the smell of the mushrooms transport one away."

The symbol of Wales is the leek, which is associated with Saint David's Day and this is referred to in Shakespeare's history play Henry V, Act V scene 1, where reference is made to Welsh soldiers wearing leeks in their Monmouth caps:

Fluellen: "If your Majesty is remembered of it, the Welshmen did good service in a garden where leeks did grow, wearing leeks in their Monmouth caps, which your Majesty knows, to this hour is an honourable badge of the service, and I do believe, your Majesty takes no scorn to wear the leek upon Saint Tavy's day".

King Henry: "I wear it for a memorable honour; for I am Welsh, you know, good countryman".

== Sauces and condiments ==
Freeman notes that Hot Sour Pickle Confection (Suryn Cyffaith Poeth) is an ancient Welsh sauce which has its roots in liquamen, one of the earliest condiments of the Romans and which was also called garum, in Greek. This sauce was made from the salted, putrified remains of fish and was used instead of salt by the Romans and Greeks. When the Romans left Wales, the sauce continued to be used. Freeman notes that one of the surviving recipes is remarkably like HP Sauce. The recipe is contained in the recipe book Croeso Cymreig and Freeman comments that it was probably preserved in a household cookery book from a plas, or Welsh country house.

Rowan jelly is a traditional condiment for mutton and lamb. Freeman comments that it has a more subtle flavour than redcurrant sauce and that it has been served since the earliest times. Freeman comments that rowan berries, when ripe, "hang like scarlet curtains along the deep, narrow lanes" of Wales and commends them for making a "lovely deep, scarlet red jelly".

== Bread and cakes ==
Due to the large, fertile river valleys of the Wye and Severn and the county's relatively sheltered location Monmouthshire has the greatest acreage of land under wheat production in Wales. Generally, Wales is too wet and mountainous for large scale wheat production, but the geography of Monmouthshire provides the rich soil and dry, sunny weather that wheat needs during ripening and harvesting. However, the county's many gristmills have since disappeared. >

Freeman notes that the old varieties of bread from Wales were mostly rough or coarse varieties that were made with flours from whole grain, barley meal, oatmeal or rye. Bread was usually baked in a wall-oven, which was specially heated for the day, or in a bread-oven housed in a separate small building of its own, near to the house. In areas where peat provided fuel a large cast-iron pot with a lid, similar to a Dutch oven and known as the ffwrn fach, would be used to bake bread. The ffwrn fach would hang on a tripod over a peat fire indoors. The inside of the pot was greased and the dough placed inside.

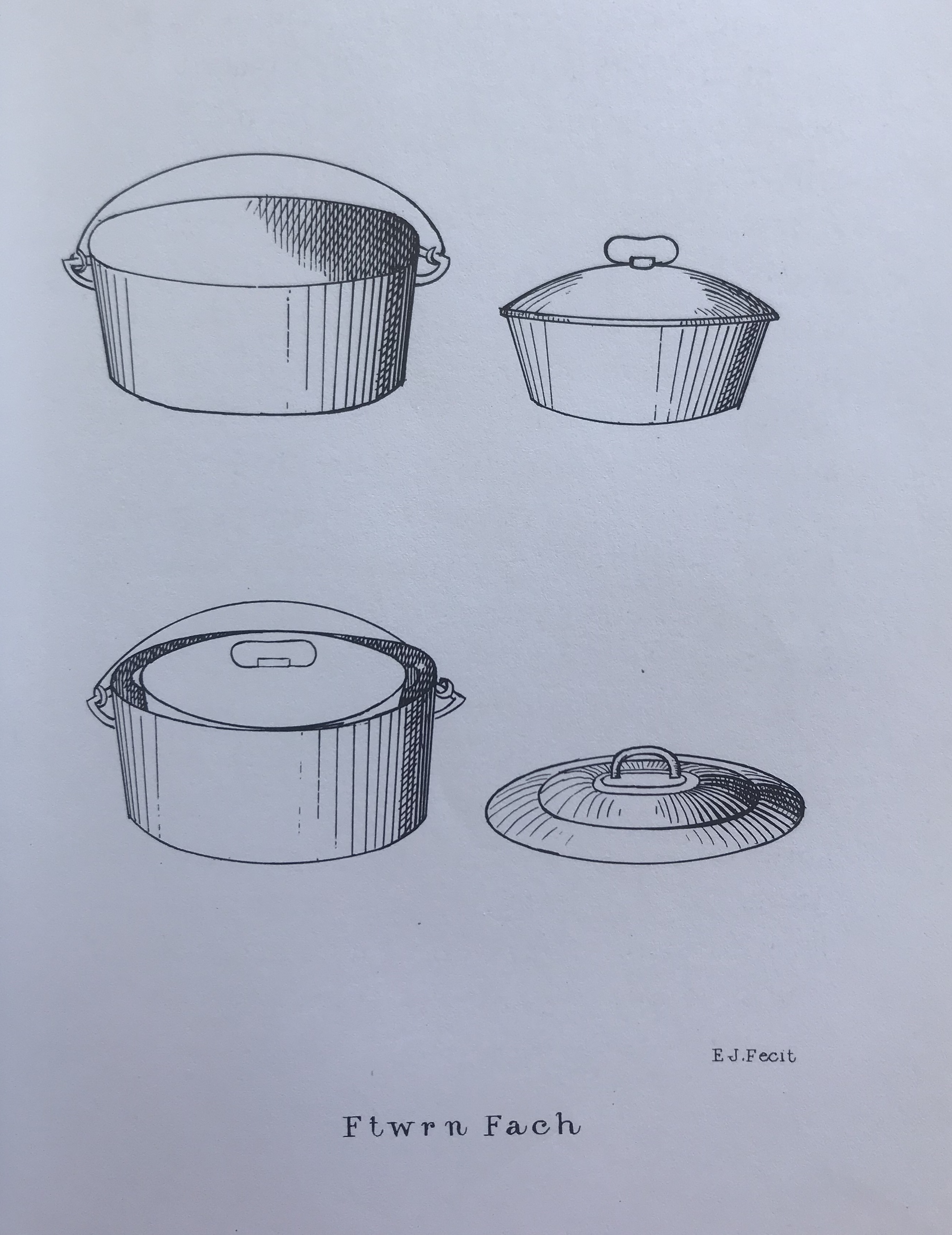
Illustration of a Welsh cooking pot called a Ffwrn Fach, from the book “The First Principles of Good Cookery“ by Lady Llanover

Peat coals were put on top of the lid. Llanover mentions using the fwrn ffach in many of the recipes contained in her cookery book. It was usually used to bake white bread, which was considered a great luxury until, during the twentieth century, commercial production made white bread more common. However, Freeman notes that the health benefits of whole grain bread have subsequently led to greater demand for this type of bread in Wales. White bread has a historical connection with the county. Henry Jones was the inventor of self raising flour, he was born in Monmouth and lived at Llanfihangel Rogiet. Jones was granted a patent for self raising flour in 1845 and was granted a Royal Warrant and appointed purveyor of patent flour and biscuits to Queen Victoria in 1846. His bakery was based at Broadmead in Bristol and his patent records are held at Bristol Archives (Bristol Archives online catalogue (Ref. 29932)) Jones worshipped at St Michael and All Angels Church, Llanfihangel Rogiet, which is now cared for by the Friends of Friendless Churches who have produced an online guide for visitors to the church.

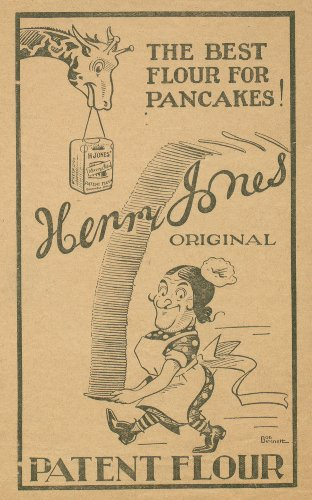
Advertisement for Henry Jones’ self raising flour, original held by Bristol Archives

Bakestone Cakes (Teisennau Criwsion) are traditional Monmouthshire cakes which were originally cooked on a bakestone but are now usually cooked on a griddle or heavy bread pan. They are made from flour, salt, baking powder, butter and cream and resemble scones more than a cake.

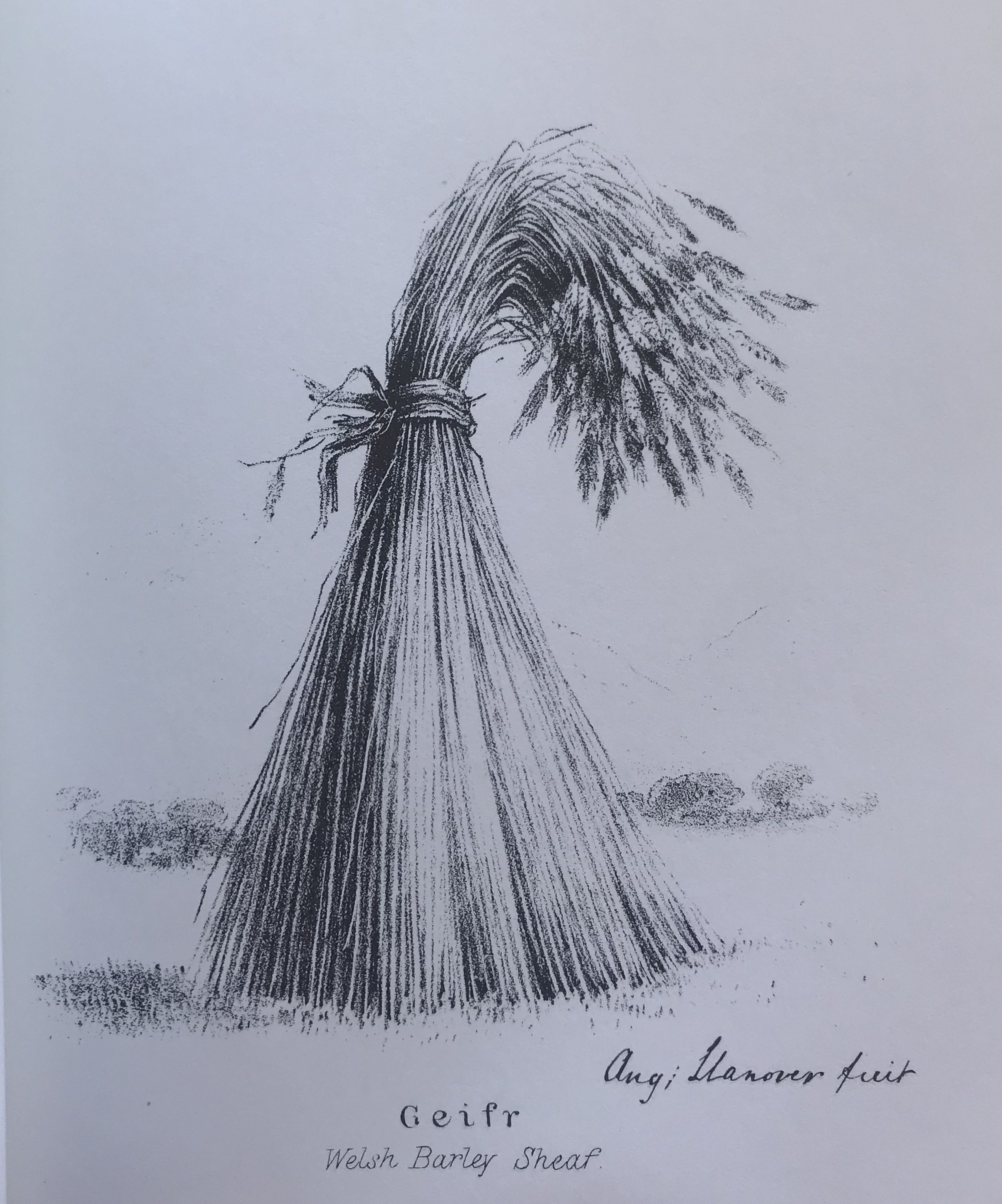
Illustration of a Welsh Barley Sheaf known as a Geifr, from the book “The First Principles of Good Cookery“ by Lady Llanover

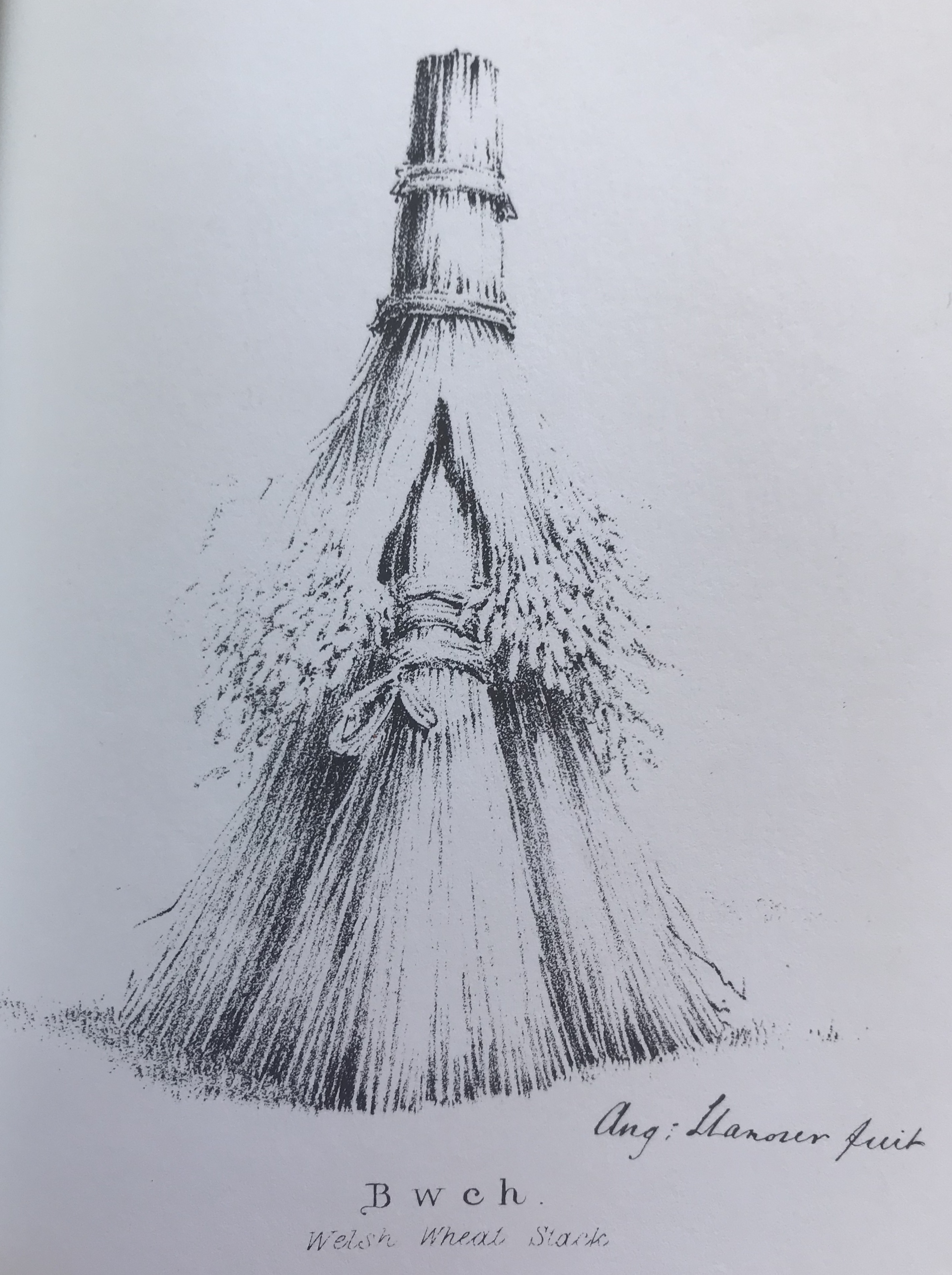
Illustration of a Welsh Wheat Stack known as a Bwch, from the book “The First Principles of Good Cookery“ by Lady Llanover

Other traditional breads include Barley bread (Bara barlys), which was traditionally eaten with most meals. Rye bread (Bara rhyg) is a less popular bread and was usually only eaten for medicinal reasons due to the unusual taste and black colour of the flour. Oatcakes (Bara ceirch) were considered to have bodybuilding properties and were a respected addition to the daily diet. Llanover makes the following observation regarding oatmeal:

"The preparation of oatmeal is particularly well understood in Wales, as well as in Scotland; but, by an extraordinary perversity, the kilns necessary for its preparation are becoming very scarce in the Principality, and in many districts of South Wales the people are beginning to suffer very much from the kilns not being kept up, or being appropriated to some other use. Next to bread and good water, oatmeal may be considered as one of the first necessaries of life to a rural population; indeed, in some parts of Wales it still (as in Scotland) takes the place of bread in many instances; and when this is not the case, its valuable and nutritive properties, in sickness and in health, when it is converted into a variety of wholesome and nourishing dishes by the Welsh, render it to them almost a Staff of Life."

The Real Bread Campaign is a campaign that promotes bread made by local, independent bakeries and that is free of artificial additives. Bakeries in Abergavenny, Cwmbran and Grosmont are members of the movement. The Campaign claims that locally owned bakeries support more skilled jobs per loaf, help keep money circulating in the local economy and support local high streets.

Yates notes that baking day and afternoon tea have long been traditions in Wales:

"….mountains of bread and spiced cakes take the family through the week. Nowhere has the bakestone been more utilized than in the Welsh kitchen – to make pancakes, griddle cakes and bread. There are cakes that can be rustled up for unexpected guests and cakes that will keep for several days, ready to fill the lunch boxes of hard-working hill farmers, miners, quarry workers and fishermen"

== Milk, cheese and ice cream ==
Monmouthshire produces milk of a high quality and the county is an important milk-producing area. The Caldicot and Wentloog Levels form a low-lying belt of flat, reclaimed land which stretches from Chepstow to Cardiff and is protected by a sea wall. It is a traditional summer grazing area that has diversified into dairy farming in order to satisfy the demand for butter and cheese from Newport and Cardiff.

Monmouthshire also produces cheese. Caerphilly cheese is recorded as being on sale in London long before other regional cheeses became available outside their area of origin. Other, less common varieties of cheese include Newport Cheese, which is a thick, square, cream cheese which was traditionally made in the month of May. Llanover writes about purchasing Sage cheese, which was a popular local cheese variety, at Pontllanfraith, where it was known as Mynydd Islwyn Cheese. Sage Cheese was usually green and, if the sage did not make the cheese green enough, then spinach juice would be added. Marigold Cheese was another local cheese variety. It was made by adding marigolds which would give the cheese a yellow colour and a pungent flavour. Marigold Cheese was considered to be a summer treat, rather than being a staple cheese.

Tintern cheese is a mature cheddar cheese with a creamy texture it contains fresh chives and shallots. Justin Rees, in his book Welsh Cheese Recipes, has a recipe for a Cheese spread made from Tintern Cheddar, butter, eggs, salt and mustard. Y Fenni cheese has a tangy mustard flavour, moist texture and pale-yellow colouring. It is coated with wholegrain mustard seed and Welsh ale and is preserved in a cream-coloured wax. Rees recommends this cheese for a ploughman's lunch, a Welsh rarebit or to accompany a steak. In relation to cheese made from sheep milk Llanover comments:

"I confess that when the Hermit first told me that his best cheese owed its superiority to the addition of sheep's milk, I thought he was jesting….. but I am now fully aware that the milk of that valuable animal (the Welsh sheep), when mingled with that of the cow, produces cheese which is not only excellent to eat new, but, when old, is more like Parmesan than anything else I ever tasted"

Llanover writes that the proportions for such a cheese require one quart of ewe's milk to five quarts of cow's milk (or six quarts of ewe's milk to thirty quarts of cow's milk). This will make a cheese weighing from twelve to fourteen pounds which will be "of a most superior quality, with the sharpness much admired in Parmesan".

Up until the 18th century large goat herds provided milk for cheese and there has been a revival in the production of goat cheese since the twentieth century, particularly around Abergavenny. . Pantysgawn Farm produces a soft goat's cheese based on an old recipe called Pantysgawn. The farm also produces St Illtyd Cheese, a mature cheese made with garlic, white wine and herbs; St David's Cheese, a continental-style washed-rind cheese; and Y Fenni cheese, a mature cheese milled with ale and mustard seeds. Rees writes that Y Fenni Cheese has a tangy mustard flavour, moist texture and pale-yellow colouring. It is coated with wholegrain mustard seed and Welsh ale and preserved in a cream-coloured wax. Davies refers to a recipe called Breast of Chicken filled with Y Fenni Cheese, where this cheese is used as a stuffing with parsley

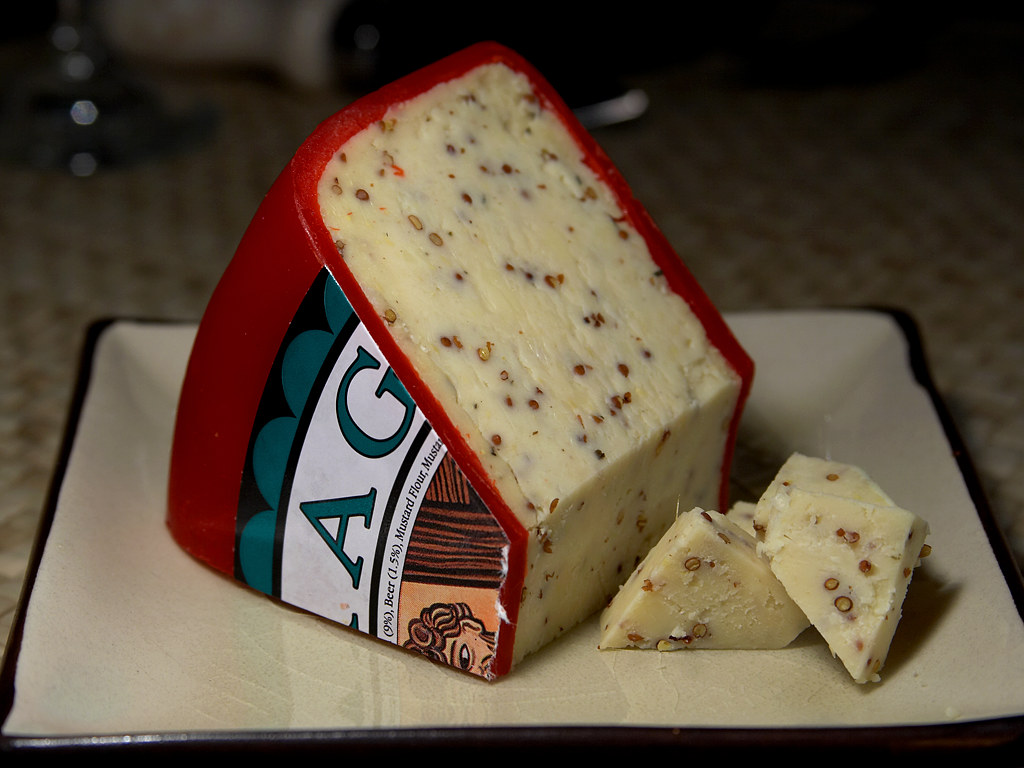
Y Fenni cheese

Davies notes that cheese making in Wales remained a cottage industry for longer than elsewhere in Britain and that Welsh girls were noted for being accomplished cheese and butter makers before they left home to start their own household and cheese-making as a cottage industry remains evident in the county. In her campaign to revive and champion regional and national cookery, the English culinarian, Florence White, drew attention to the Hill Farms near Monmouth and Welsh Newton, writing that "the farmers' and cottagers' wives make their own bread and cottage cheese. Each cottage has its own garden. The women are wonderful housewives." Monmouthshire fruit farms have also helped develop the county's ice cream production. Brookes Dairy Company is noted by Davies as an example of a local ice cream producer. It is based on a farm at Devauden, near Tintern Abbey and started production in 1991.

== Fruit and puddings ==
Monmouthshire was once one of the main fruit producers of Wales with production equal to the orchards of Herefordshire and Worcestershire. Monmouthshire orchards were once particularly plentiful along the Herefordshire border.

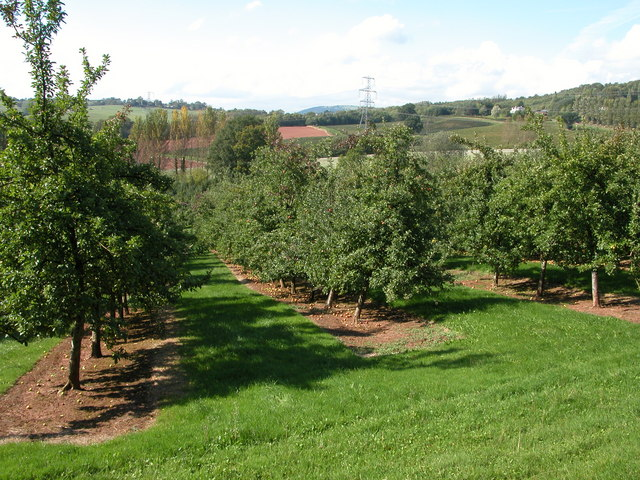
Philip Halling / Apple orchards near Colebrook Wood, Monmouthshire

Welsh apples that originated in Monmouthshire include table apple varieties such as Breakwell's Seedling and Perthyre and cooking apples such as Cissy (from Newport), Machen (from Chepstow) and St Cecilia (from Newport). Gwehelog is a variety of pear from Monmouthshire. Yates notes that, today, old-fashioned varieties of apples are being used for making preserves and award-winning single-variety apple juices. A poem, published in 1720, and referred to in Cider Making in Wales, by J Williams-Davies (1984), describes the Counties of Wales and makes particular reference to the orchards of Monmouthshire:

Gwrth y marched hyn yn union
Nyddu rhai gwlanenni meinion
Trin seidr o'r perllamau tewfrith
A gweithio heliau gwellt y gwenith

The women here are employed
In spinning some fine flannels
In making cider from the bounteous orchards
And in making hats from wheat straw.

The orchards of Monmouthshire also made an impression on William Wordsworth who refers to them in his poem Lines Written a Few Miles above Tintern Abbey:

The landscape with the quiet of the sky.
The day is come when I again repose
Here, under this dark sycamore, and view
These plots of cottage-ground, these orchard-tufts,
Which at this season, with their unripe fruits,
Are clad in one green hue, and lose themselves
'Mid groves and copses.

Apple brandy Pudding (Pwdin Afal Brandi) is a recipe from Anne Hughes diary, it requires cooking apples, brown molasses sugar, brandy, bread crumbs, eggs and cream Freeman notes that the diary is a useful source of information on local farming practices and traditional recipes. During 2010 to 2012 Gwent Wildlife Trust surveyed over 800 acres of orchards in the county as part of a project funded by the Heritage Lottery Fund, the Countryside Council for Wales and the Wye Valley AONB Sustainable Development Fund. The aim was to make communities aware of their orchard heritage and the wildlife in them. It also created an orchard data base and aimed to plant new orchards.

Some of the first peaches to be grown in Britain were cultivated at Troy House, the summer house of the Marquis of Worcester, located at Mitchel Troy. Peaches from Troy became famous when the Marquis offered them as a gift to Charles I of England just before the English Civil War. They became known as "the peaches of Troy". According to tradition, Troy peaches puzzled social commentators of the time because they could not believe such an exotic fruit could come from "poor wet Wales", which was assumed to be capable of only growing leeks. It was therefore assumed that the peaches came from Troy in Anatolia, thus adding considerably to the reputation of the Marquis, so that: "all speculated how even so rich a man as the Marquis could afford the swift conveyance of such a perishable fruit across Europe to London...."

The remains of various types of fruit have been found on board the Newport Ship, this is a mid-fifteenth-century sailing vessel discovered by archaeologists in June 2002 in the city of Newport, the fruit may have been for on-board consumption or formed part of a cargo, well-preserved remains have been found of walnuts, almonds, hazelnuts, pomegranates, grapes, figs and olive. The ship may have been built by Basque shipwrights, either in the Basque region of Spain or south-western France and the fruit found on board may have come from this region.

Taruschio notes that the bilberry is "a wonderfully flavoured tiny purple fruit with a grey bloom" and notes it grows on low, dense bushes which makes them back-breaking to pick but worth the effort. He comments that in Wales bilberries are known as whimberries and that they grow in profusion on the Black Mountains and other mountains around Abergavenny. The Abergavenny area offers a number of locations where produce can be hand-picked. Berry Hill Farm, located in the village of Coedkernew, is noted by Davies as an example of a farm where fruit can be picked between June and October and where there is a farm shop.

A Welsh pudding is usually made with milk, bread and fruit. One of the classic Welsh puddings is Monmouth Pudding (Pwdin Mynwy). This uses cooked fruit, with apples or plums being favourite ingredients. Alternatively, jam can also be used. The fruit or jam is layered with breadcrumbs soaked in milk. Lemon rind, sugar and butter are added to the milk and this is brought to the boil and then poured over the breadcrumbs. After the mix has cooled for 10–15 minutes egg yolk is added and the mix is spooned into dishes. A layer of fruit or jam is placed over the mix and a meringue topping is added. It is then baked until crisp.

Raglan Pudding, named after Raglan, is usually made with apple, pear, plum or blackberry. The flour and salt are sieved and beaten into a smooth batter with eggs and milk. This is poured over the fruit and baked in a hot oven. The pudding is served with fresh cream. Rhian Williams comments that this pudding always reminds her of the 'medelwyr', the harvesters of olden times. The medelwyr used to make the annual trek to the farms on the England-Wales border around Hereford, in July and August, then return to work on their own harvest in September.

Davies refers to a meringue recipe called Monmouth Meringue Pudding, which uses lemon rind, caster sugar, butter and seasonal fruit, such as strawberries, or jam.

Fruit pies are usually made with fruit such as apple, plum, damson, rhubarb, gooseberry or whinberry. Before the introduction of the oven Welsh puddings would be cooked on a flat bakestone. Yates notes that in the rural areas of South East Wales, most homes would have had an apple, damson, plum or medlar tree in the back garden. The fruit would be used to make puddings such as Apple Pie (Pwdin Afalau), Chilled Fruit Pudding (Pwdin Frwythau Oeredig), or used for cakes and preserves. Gooseberries are another traditional fruit. Yates mentions a recipe for Gooseberry fool (Ffwl Eirin Mair) and notes that this recipe can use gooseberries or other soft fruit when available, such as blackberries, raspberries, blackcurrant or rhubarb. Gwent Gooseberry Cream (Eirin Mair Hufennog Gwent) is a Gwent recipe from the book Favourite Welsh Recipes and involves poaching gooseberries in a saucepan and spooning them into individual ramekin dishes. A mixture of yoghurt, cream, vanilla extract, and icing sugar is folded on top and decorated with brown sugar which forms a crunchy topping once the dessert is refrigerated.

== Drinks ==
After the Roman conquest of Britain the Romans grew grapes along the River Monnow at Monmouth (see: Ancient Rome and Wine). The practice continued during medieval times and has been revived during the twentieth century. During the medieval period wines were produced using Roman techniques and production was confined to monastic houses. However, during the eighteenth century, the importation of relatively cheap sugar made from sugarcane meant that domestic fruit wine production became popular.

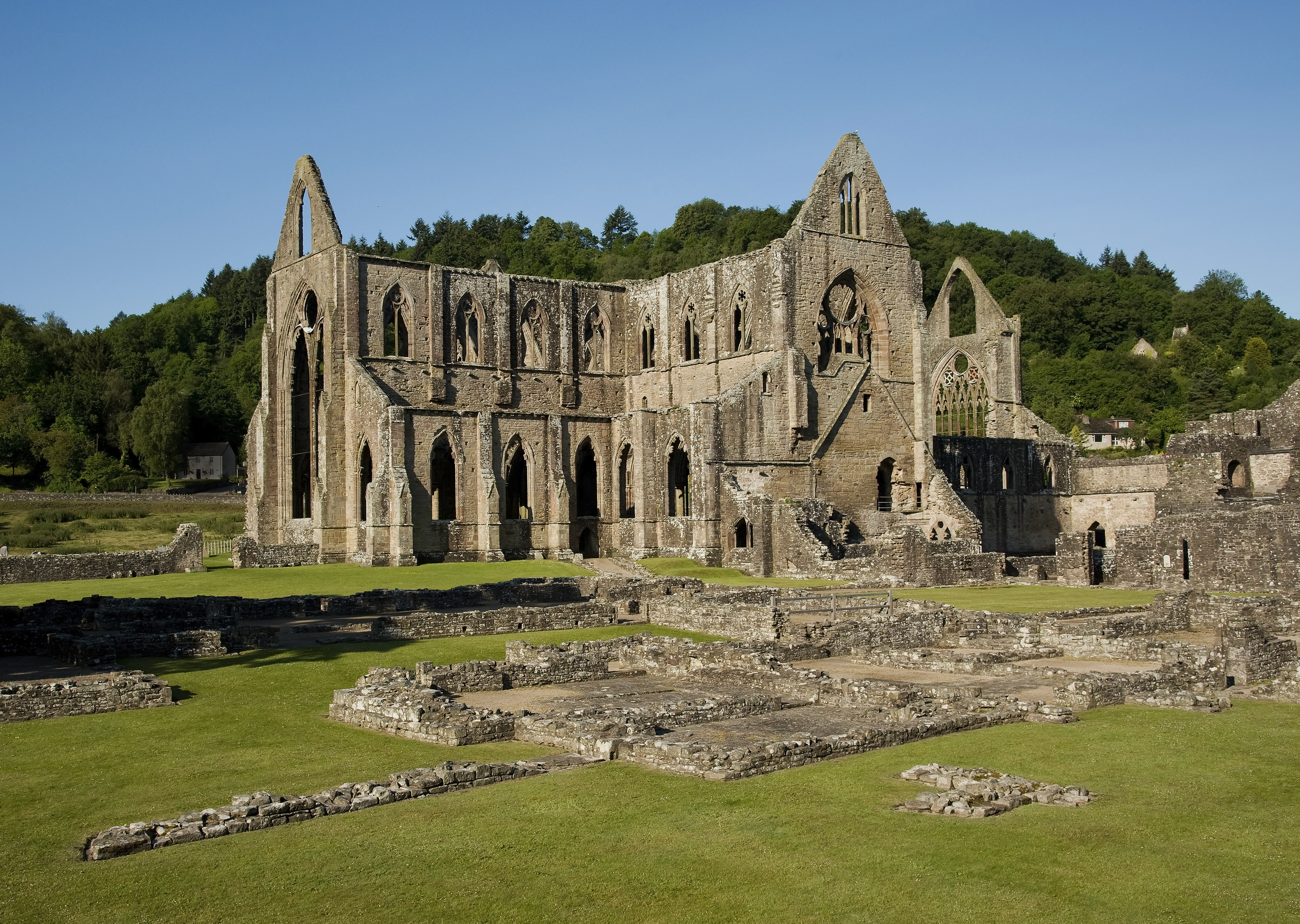
Tintern Abbey

The re-establishment of traditional viticulture in Monmouthshire since the 1970s has seen a number of vineyards being established. These vineyards produce white wine using German grape varieties (see: German wine), although a small amount of red wine, rosé and sparkling wine is also produced. Davies notes that Tintern Parva is a wine produced on land once owned by Tintern Abbey. The vineyard is one of the oldest in Wales, being established in 1979, and overlooks the village of Tintern and the Abbey. The vineyard is planted with Pinot noir and other grape varieties. It produces wine and sparkling wine. Tintern Parva Bacchus, a dry white wine from this vineyard, was awarded a gold medal at the Welsh National Wine Competition in 2015.

Monnow Valley Wine is located at Great Osbaston Farm and was planted in the 1980s on a Double Guyot training system but has since expanded using the Geneva double-curtain system. Davies notes that the vineyard produces an unblended Madeleine Angevine, a Seyval blanc and a blend of Huxelrebe and Seyval. Ancre Hill Estates was planted with Chardonnay, Pinot noir, Seyval blanc and Triomphe grape varieties and produces a sparkling wine using the Champenoise method. A wine trail has been established called Wine Trail Wales which provides information on Welsh vineyards and visitor information.

Lady Llanover was a strong supporter of the temperance movement and closed all the pubs around Llanover, an action that Taruschio recalls was remembered for many years afterwards by the local inhabitants. Like the rest of Wales, craft beer has had a renaissance in Monmouthshire (see: Beer in Wales). The microbrewery industry includes Hapax Brewing Co of Tintern (established 2005); Kingstone Brewery of Tintern (established 2005); The Untapped Brewing Company of Raglan (established 2013); Castles Brewery Ltd of Portskewett (established 2014); Mad Dog Brewing Co. Ltd., of Penperlleni, Pontypool (established 2014), Melin Tap Brewhouse Limited of Little Mill, Monmouthshire (established 2015), and Baa Brewing Limited of Chepstow (established 2016). Campaign for Real Ale write that the following Monmouthshire pubs have historic interiors of national significance: The Station (Abergavenny), Hens and Chickens (Abergavenny), The Wheatsheaf (Llanhennock), Llanthony Priory Hotel (Llanthony), The Old Nags Head (Monmouth), the Queen's Head (Monmouth), The Royal Oak (Monmouth), The Carpenter's Arms (Shirenewton) and the Royal Hotel (Usk). Part of the cycle of twelve narrative poems called Idylls of the King, published between 1859 and 1885 by the poet Alfred, Lord Tennyson, was written in the Hanbury Arms in Caerleon, where a plaque commemorates the event. T. S. Eliot makes a reference to the White Hart Inn, Llangybi in his 1935 poem "Usk".

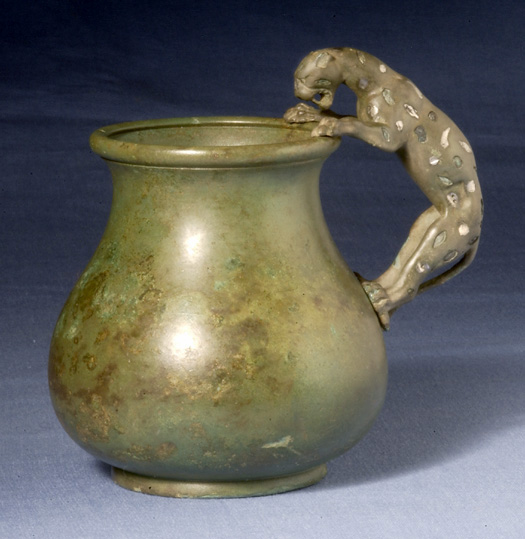
Monmouthshire Leopard Cup, a Roman copper-alloy drinking vessel with a handle sculpted into a leopard with silver spots and amber eyes, the Cup was found in Llantilio Pertholey and shows the sophistication of Roman lifestyles in the county (recorded under the Portable Antiquities Scheme)

Many farms in Monmouthshire have their own cider presses. and many old cider mills can be found in the county with millstones made from pudding stone from the Wye Valley.

The county has an increasing number of orchards producing cider and perry with a developing reputation based on the high quality of its fruit. The Welsh Perry and Cider Society was established in 2001 and supports Welsh producers, it is credited with reviving Welsh cider production. The Welsh Perry and Cider Festival is held at Caldicot Castle where the Welsh Perry and Cider Championships are judged. Springfield Cider of Llangovan won a gold medal in Camra's National Cider and Perry Championships in 2013 for its Wobbly Monk cider which is produced from a 100-acre orchard. CJ's Surprise is a cider produced by C J Watkins near Usk. Tynewydd Farm at Llanarth, Monmouthshire is one of two licensed cider houses in Wales and produces Raglan Cider Mill cider and a perry. Bishop's Fancy is a perry made from a variety of Monmouthshire winter pear, it is produced at Three Saints farm from ancient orchards using traditional production methods. Ty-Bryn Cider is produced in Grosmont from a traditional orchard in a cellar built in the 1700s. It uses old varieties of apple such as Tom Putt and modern varieties like Dabinett. Apple County Cider produces single variety ciders from varieties such as Dabinett, Michelin, Vilberie, Brown Snout and Yarlington Mill. The cider is cold fermented through the winter.(See also: List of cider and perry producers in the United Kingdom).The Welsh Perry and Cider Society has a museum orchard outside Llanarth where they analyse the DNA of Welsh apple and pear varieties.

Wye Valley Meadery uses local honey to make different varieties of mead and received advice and support from the Prince's Trust Cymru and won a NatWest Enterprise Award for transforming a business idea into a sustainable business. The enterprise was launched in 2018 and is based in Chepstow. The mead has a 5.5% alcohol content and is produced in a variety of flavours including rhubarb, ginger and elderflower.

== Restaurants ==
The book Relish Wales, published in 2011 and 2016, notes the following restaurants in the county: 1861 (located at Cross Ash), The Beaufort Arms Hotel, Monmouth, The Bell (at Skenfrith), The Whitebrook, The Hardwick (at Abergavenny, now closed), The Newbridge on Usk (at Tredunnock), and The Walnut Tree. Some of these restaurants have been awarded Michelin stars. (see: Michelin Guide)

== Festivals ==
Food festivals held in Monmouthshire include the Abergavenny Food Festival, Monmouthshire Food Festival, Newport Food Festival, and the Welsh Perry and Cider Festival.

== See also ==
- Welsh cuisine
- Franco Taruschio
- Cuisine of Carmarthenshire
- Cuisine of Ceredigion
- Cuisine of Gower
- Cuisine of Pembrokeshire
- Cuisine of Swansea
- Cuisine of the Vale of Glamorgan
