= Gwenffrwd, Aeron =

Tributary river in Ceredigion, Wales

The Gwenffrwd is a right-bank tributary of the River Aeron in Ceredigion, mid Wales. From its source, east of the hamlet of Bethania, it flows generally southwards to meet the Aeron near Capel Betws Lleucu, southwest of the village of Llangeitho.
