= S. Minwel Tibbott =

Welsh-born historian

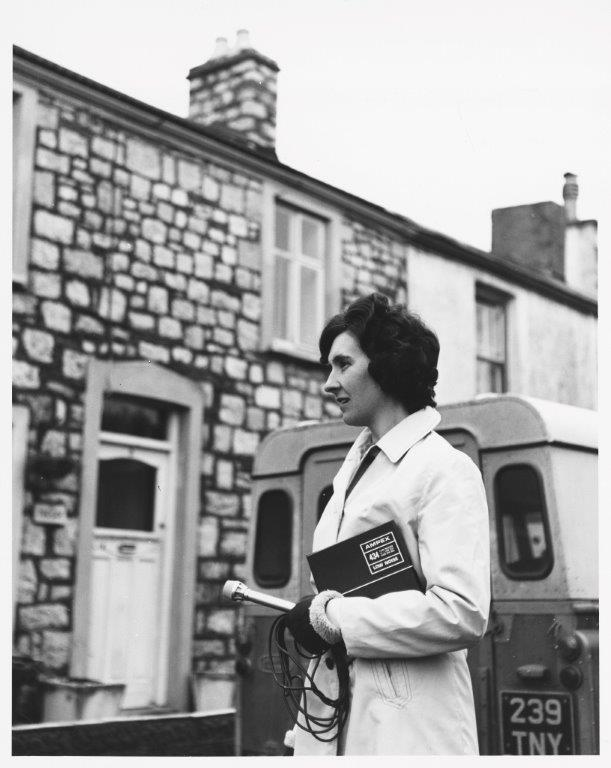
- Occupations: Historian and folklorist
- Writing career
- Notable work: Welsh Fare
- Literary movement: Pioneer of women's studies in Wales

Sara Minwel Tibbott was an oral historian, anthropologist, folklorist, and researcher on Welsh cuisine.

Tibbott is considered to be a pioneer in the field of women's studies in Wales and an expert in the study of domestic life and traditional foods.

Tibbott was born Sara Minwel Williams. She married Delwyn Tibbott in Crugybar on 2 April 1960.

== Career ==
Tibbott was an assistant keeper at the Department of Oral Traditions and Dialects at St Fagans National Museum of History. Through her fieldwork across Wales she collected and recorded Welsh folk life for the museum for it to be made available to people interested in Welsh life.

With the introduction of the tape recorder it became possible for Tibbott and the museum to record people speaking about their lives. By collecting such recordings Tibbott helped the museum to build an archive of oral recollections of traditional Welsh life. The collection is now kept in the archives as taped interviews or in manuscript form and is available on the museum's web site.

== Writing ==
Tibbott contributed to the museum's programme of publications on Welsh life with Welsh Fare. The book was published in the Welsh language in 1974 and an English language edition followed in 1975. The book is based on oral evidence collected by Tibbott from speakers throughout Wales who supplied information concerning traditional Welsh cuisine. The book contains a selection of recipes and background commentary on them. The commentary is academic in nature and explains the role the recipes have had in the history of food in Wales. In 2017 the book was published on the museum's web site.

The book is divided into chapters containing recipes on: savoury (dish) food; griddle cakes; cakes; bread; cereal and milk dishes; puddings; fish; jams; toffee and drinks. The recipes include those for dishes commonly eaten at the turn of the twentieth century and based on information provided by people who had used them over many years. Like folk songs and folk tales, recipes were transmitted orally and survived through memory. This meant they could be forgotten or lost easily over the generations and also meant they changed over time. Many foods and recipes were also connected with local customs.

In the booklet The Gwalia: The Story of a Valleys Shop, Tibbott outlined the history of Gwalia Stores from its opening in 1880 to its closure almost a century later.

In the book Domestic Life in Wales, Tibbott wrote about specific aspects of the folk life of Wales. The book was seen by the Western Mail (Wales) as breaking new ground in the study of folk life in Wales. The book also demonstrated the variety and depth of Tibbot's research, it covers the social and cultural history of Wales, folk life and food history and is based on oral and documentary evidence from a variety of sources and periods. The book contains eight chapters on different elements of folk life. In 'Liberality and Hospitality', Tibbot analysed the importance of food as a social factor through the ages. In 'Laundering in the Welsh Home', Tibbott wrote about the time before washing machines, when laundry was a major domestic task. In 'Sucan and Llymru', the sour oatmeal-based 'jelly' produced in Wales is analysed. In 'Cheese-making in Glamorgan' the women's task of cheese-making and its contribution to farming income is discussed. In 'Traditional Breads of Wales', Tibbott writes about the making of home-made bread. In the section 'Going Electric', Tibbott records the changes that modernised the farmhouse kitchen and the suspicion around it. In 'The Covering of Table Legs in (South-East) Wales', a series of photographs demonstrates this unusual tradition. In the final chapter, 'Knitting Stockings in Wales', Tibbott discussed the economic value of knitting and the implements connected with it. Tibbott died before she completed her work and Beth Thomas, Keeper of Social and Cultural History at the museum completed the work.

In her review of the book, for the Welsh Books Council, Susan Passmore commented:

Mrs Tibbott was a pioneer in the field of women's studies, with her recognition of the wider significance of these generally unsung domestic tasks

In the book O'r Gwaith I'r Gwely: A Woman's Work, Tibbott (and Beth Thomas) used women's recollections from the Sound Archive at the Museum of Welsh Life to show what women's lives were like during the twentieth century. The book shows the skills, effort and many hours of labour needed to run a home.

Tibbot contributed to scholarly journals such as Folk Life, where in 1981 she published her article on Laundering in the Welsh Home.

Tibbott also published in Welsh, including a book on kitchen terminology: Geirfa'r gegin: Casgliad o dermau yn ymwneud â pharatoi a choginio bwyd.

== List of books ==
- Welsh Fare, A Selection of Traditional Recipes, National Museum of Wales (Welsh Folk Museum), 1976. ISBN 0 85485 040 6
- Cooking on the Open Hearth, National Museum of Wales (Welsh Folk Museum), 1982. ISBN 0 85485 055 4
- Geirfa'r Gegin: Casgliad O Dermau Yn Ymwneud a Pharatoi a Choginio Bwyd, Amgueddfa Werin Cymru, Llandysul, 1983. ISBN 9780854850648
- The Gwalia: The Story of a Valleys Shop, National Museums and Galleries of Wales, 1991. ISBN 978-0720003550
- O'r Gwaith I'r Gwely: A Woman's Work, National Museum of Wales, 1994. ISBN 978-0720004168
- Domestic Life in Wales, University of Wales Press, 2002. ISBN 978 0708317464
