= Y Fenni cheese =

Type of Welsh cheese

Y Fenni
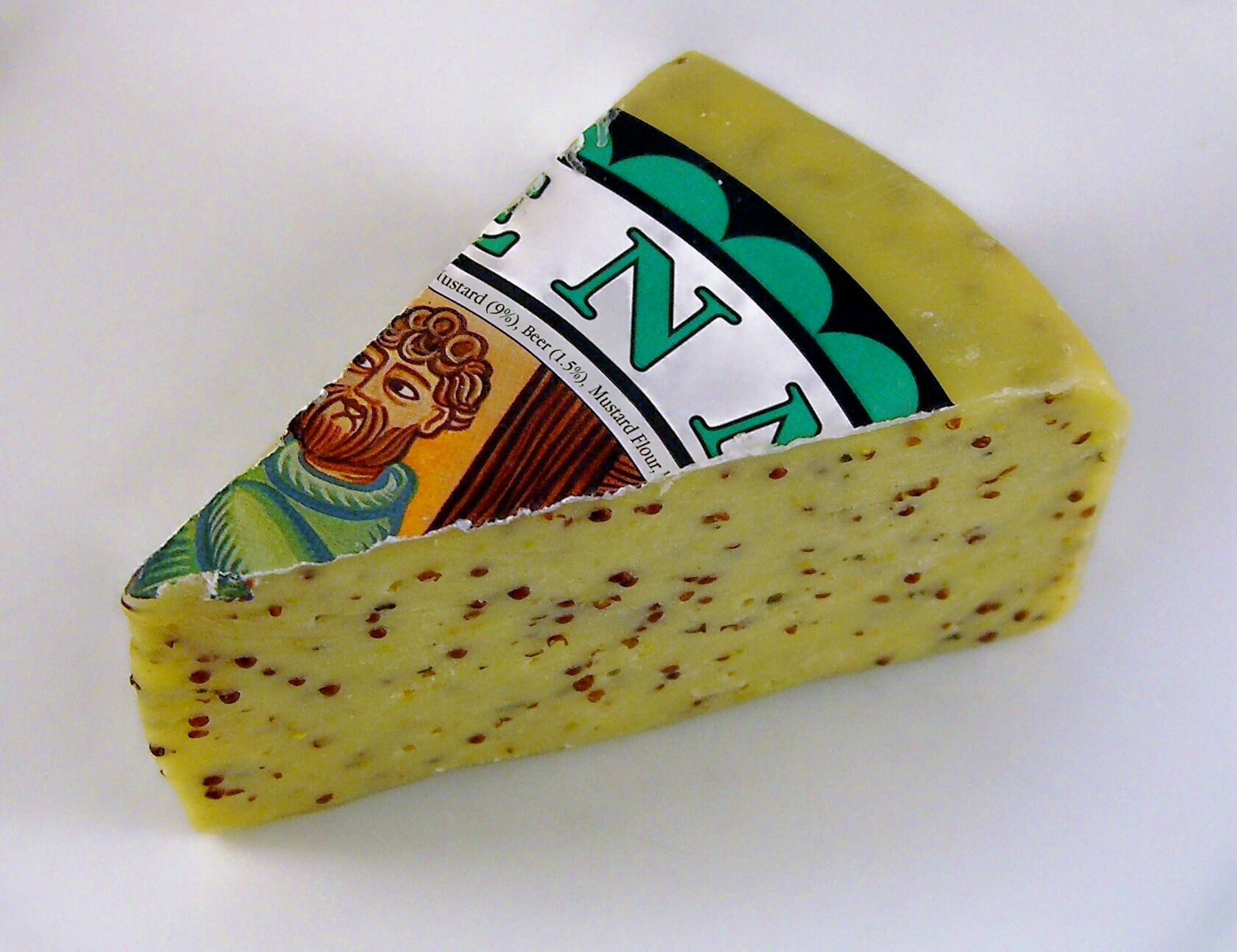
- Country of origin: Wales
- Region: Monmouthshire
- Town: Abergavenny
- Source of milk: Cows
- Texture: Firm
- Named after: Abergavenny

Y Fenni (Welsh pronunciation: [əˈvɛni]) is a variety of Welsh cheese, consisting of Cheddar cheese blended with mustard seed and ale. It takes its name from the Welsh language name of Abergavenny, a market town in Monmouthshire, South East Wales. Y Fenni, when coated in red wax, is also known as Red Dragon, a name derived from the dragon on the Flag of Wales.
