= Bethania, Ceredigion =

Village in Ceredigion, Wales

Coordinates: 52.2509°N 4.0896°W

Bethania is a hamlet in Ceredigion, mid Wales. Because Bethania is a hamlet, it does not have an individual census. Therefore, its population is grouped under the civil parish council of Dyffryn Arth. The name "Bethania" comes from the Welsh spelling of the biblical village of Bethany. In 1809, Calvinistic Methodists built Chapel Bethania. Historically, the hamlet's economy relied entirely on agriculture. Bethania is home to the Tŷ Nant company. The company used the natural aquifer in Bethania. The company was founded in 1989.

== Geography ==
The centre of this dispersed community in the rural heart of the county is at the junction of the B4577 and B4576 roads.

The bottling plant of the Tŷ Nant bottled water company is nearby.
