= Tŷ Nant =

Water company from Ceredigion, Wales

- Company type: Privately held company
- Headquarters: Wales
- Products: Natural Mineral Water Still & Sparkling
- Website: tynant.com

Tŷ Nant is a mineral water brand bottled at source in Bethania, Ceredigion, Wales. Tŷ Nant is Welsh for "House by the stream".

== History ==
The Tŷ Nant water source was discovered in 1976 by a water diviner. A borehole was sunk through one hundred feet of rock and clay to an underground aquifer which was found to be drinkable.

In December 1996, Tŷ Nant invested in a new 45,000 sq ft bottling plant which increased production capacity fivefold. Built with assistance from the Development Board for Rural Wales, it is sited directly above the original borehole where the first waters were drawn in 1976.

In July 2025, Tŷ Nant acquired Strathmore Water from A.G. Barr./

== Product range ==
Tŷ Nant's cobalt blue glass bottle range was launched in 1989, and won the British "First Glass" Award for Design Excellence. A crimson red bottle, called "Tŷ Nant Too", was produced in 1999 to mark the company's 10th anniversary. In 2001 Tŷ Nant entered the PET bottle market. A new product, TAU spring water, was launched in 2003 with an award-winning design.

== Sources ==
The company sources its spring water from within a 300-acre (120 ha) site, managed sustainably, and situated on the edge of the Cambrian Mountains of Wales. As it is surrounded by rocks of very low transmissivity, the spring consists of recharge directly through the surface of the ground above, whilst lateral flows into the aquifer from the surrounding, relatively low permeability rock are insignificant.

== Current ownership ==
Tŷ Nant was bought out in 1992 by its Italian distributor, Biscaldi Luigi Import Export Srl.
