= Gilli Davies =

Welsh chef

- Born: Wales
- Culinary career
- Cooking style: Welsh cuisine
- Television show: Tastes of Wales
- Website: http://www.gillicliff.co.uk

Gilli Davies is a Cordon Bleu cook from Wales. Davies has been involved with food, food journalism and broadcasting since about 1975.

== Background ==
At the age of 19, Davies ran her own bistro in Oxford. Davies has also run a restaurant in Berlin and an organic food restaurant in Cardiff and now lives in York.

== Writing ==
Davies has written numerous cookery books based on Welsh cuisine, Cypriot cuisine and organic food.

In October 2015 Graffeg published the Flavours of Wales, a collection of five pocket books, each with over 20 recipes on Welsh cuisine.

== Television ==
In 1990, Davies wrote and presented a 10 part television series called Tastes of Wales

== Other work ==
Davies has run children's cookery classes, a training scheme to encourage restaurants to use local ingredients and a variety of other food events. Davies has been an advisor to the Food Standards Agency and is also a member and former chairwoman of the Guild of Food Writers.

== Bibliography ==
Books by Gilli Davies include:

- A Taste of Cyprus, Interworld Publications, 1998. ISBN 0948853255
- A Taste of Wales, Pavilion Books, 1995. ISBN 1-85793-2935
- Celtic Cuisine, Graffeg, 2008. ISBN 9781905582105
- Cook Organic, Metro Books, London, 1998. ISBN 190051236X
- The down to earth cookbook, British Gas Wales, 1993. ISBN 0903545527
- Eat Well in Wales, Western Mail & Echo Ltd., 1998. ISBN 1900477033
- Lamb, Leeks and Laverbread, Grafton, 1989. ISBN 0586201394
- The Joy of Organic Cookery, Metro Books, London, 2002. ISBN 1843580128
- The Very Best Flavours of Wales, Gwasg Gomer, 1997. ISBN 1859025900
- The Welsh Calendar Cookbook, Y Lolfa Cyf., 2014. ISBN 0862437490
- Flavours of Wales: Vegetarian dishes, Graffeg, 2015. ISBN 9781909823129
- Flavours of Wales: Fish and seafood, Graffeg, 2015. ISBN 9781909823112
- Flavours of Wales: Puddings and baking, Graffeg, 2015. ISBN 9781909823143
- Flavours of Wales: Starters and light dishes, Graffeg, 2015. ISBN 9781909823167
- Flavours of Wales: Meat, poultry and game, Graffeg, 2015. ISBN 9781909823136

== Video links ==
- The Flavours of Wales Series by Gilli Davies
- Top Recipe Tips by Gilli Davies

== See also ==
Laverbread
