= Bobby Freeman (writer) =

British writer (1925–2000)

- Born: 9 February 1925; Bury, Lancashire
- Died: 16 October 2000 (aged 75)
- Education: Manchester
- Children: 2 daughters
- Culinary career
- Cooking style: Cuisine of Wales
- Television show: S4C

Bobby Freeman was a writer, journalist, television presenter and cook who is known for her writing on Welsh cuisine.

== Early life ==
Freeman was born in Bury, Greater Manchester and her mother's parents came from North Wales.

Freeman studied industrial design in Manchester and then went on to teach before moving into advertising and public relations. She became the first female advertising business executive in The Midlands.

== Restaurant and first book ==
In the 1960s Freeman opened a restaurant with rooms in Fishguard, Pembrokeshire called The Compton House Hotel. Her interest in offering Welsh cuisine to guests led her to research traditional Welsh food.

In 1980 Freeman published First Catch Your Peacock. This has been described as a cross between a cookbook and a history book about the food of Wales. It is considered to be the first book on authentic Welsh cuisine based on academic research. Freeman encountered difficulties in getting the book published, having been told that there was "no such thing as Welsh food" and that it was "an absurd title" for a serious work. Regardless of the discouragement Freeman went on to publish her book which sold worldwide.

According to food critic Simon Hopkinson, writing in The Independent, the book is a delight to read and a genuine pleasure to use. He comments that the book's charm results from its eccentricities:

The resultant book is a small masterpiece. It has a recipe for Welsh salt duck served with creamed onion sauce (wonderful, and a match for French confit any day); and oyster sausages - which I am most keen to try - in which the shucked and poached oysters are chopped with herbs, cooked egg yolks, anchovies, spices and a little shredded suet, then shaped, rolled in breadcrumbs and fried in butter. These sound more like titbits Burton Racey or Ray White might use to amuse the mouth with, than recipes inspired by "the manuscript book compiled by Merryell Williams, Ystumcolywyn, early 18th century, in the Peniarth collection, National Library of Wales.

Hopkinson writes that the book is also full of the culture and social history of Welsh cuisine and notes that it also includes a recipe for peacock, as suggested by the book's title. The book has been widely and enthusiastically praised.

== Editorial work and further writing ==
Freeman edited a number of works connected with Welsh cuisine, including Lloyd George's Favourite Foods, which included a number of traditional Welsh dishes enjoyed by David Lloyd George. The book was published in 1974 based on a cookery book originally published in 1919 by Criccieth Women's Institute and which included recipes donated by his wife Margaret Lloyd George.

In 1982 Freeman edited and published Enid Roberts' Food of the Bards: the book describes the food encountered by Welsh bards on their visits to the Welsh nobility.

Freeman realised a 20-year dream when she edited The First Principles of Good Cookery, by Augusta Hall, Baroness Llanover. Originally published in London by Richard Bentley (publisher) in 1867 this was the only Welsh cookery book written in English at that time. This rare book was republished in 1991 by Brefi Press with a 6000 word introduction by Freeman.

Freeman remarked:

I have to declare my sense of kinship with Lady Llanover, which is more than the recognition of professionalism. Though 100 years separate us, I feel we are fellow-spirits, pioneers both, destined to annoy as well as please with our innovatory cookery notions.

Freeman went on to write eight books on Welsh cuisine. These are published by Y Lolfa, a publisher based in Ceredigion. Some of the books are illustrated with historical photographs from the John Thomas collection of the National Library of Wales.

== Journalism and broadcasting ==
During the 1960s and 1970s Freeman wrote for the Birmingham Post, Western Mail (Wales), South Wales Magazine and Y Faner, a Welsh language weekly. Freeman also worked for the Wales Tourist Board.

Freeman broadcast on Welsh radio and television and in the 1980s presented a film, produced by S4C, about the history of Welsh cuisine. This was the first film produced on the subject.

== Cookery school ==
In 1982 Freeman established a Welsh Cookery Centre in the River Teifi valley, near Cardigan, after having spent ten years living in Cardiff.

== List of books ==
- First Catch Your Peacock: The Classic Guide to Welsh Food, Y Lolfa Cyf., 2006. ISBN 978-0862433154
- A Book of Welsh Bread, Y Lolfa Cyf., 2001. ISBN 978-0862431372
- A Book of Welsh Country Cakes and Buns, Y Lolfa Cyf., 1988. ISBN 978-0862431389
- A Book of Welsh Bakestone Cookery, Y Lolfa Cyf., 2007. ISBN 978-0862431396
- A Book of Welsh Country Puddings & Pies, Y Lolfa Cyf., 2000. ISBN 978-0862431402
- A Book of Welsh Fish Cookery, Y Lolfa Cyf., 2002. ISBN 978-0862431419
- A Book of Welsh Soups & Savouries, Y Lolfa Cyf., 2004. ISBN 978-0862431426
- Welsh Country House Cookery, unknown imprint, 1983. ISBN 978-0950725475
- Welsh Country Cookery, Y Lolfa Cyf., 2006. ISBN 978-0862431334

== List of edited works ==
Freeman, B., Lloyd George's Favourite Dishes. John Jones Cardiff Limited, Buckingham, 1974. ISBN 978-0902375321

Pierce Roberts, Enid, and two others, Food of the Bards, 1350-1650: Verses and Food from Welsh Mediaeval Feasts of the Poets of the Noblemen. 1982. ISBN 978-0950725437

Baroness, Augusta Hall, (Freeman, B., editor) The First Principles of Good Cookery. Brefi Press, Tregaron, 1991. ISBN 0 948537 35 3
