= Cuisine of Swansea =

Welsh regional cuisine

The cuisine of Swansea (Welsh: Abertawe) is based on the city's long history and the influence of the surrounding regions of Gower, Carmarthenshire, and Glamorgan, Wales. The city has a long maritime, industrial, and academic tradition, and people from many different parts of the world have lived, studied, and worked in the city. The city's distinctive cuisine is based on the ingredients and foods that are associated with the city and the wider region.

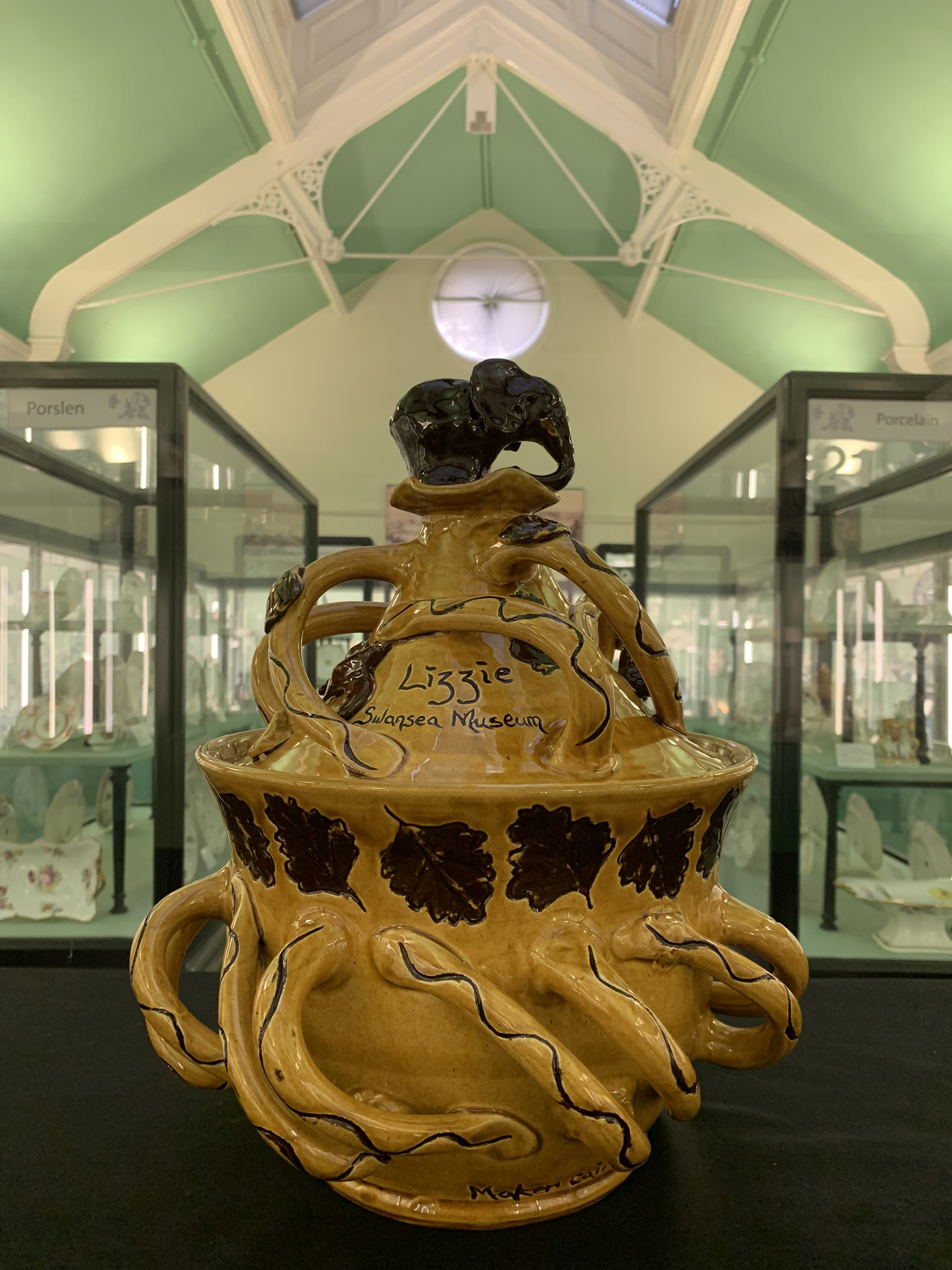
A wassail bowl made for Swansea Museum in memory of Lizzie, the Museum's stuffed elephant that stood in the entrance of the Museum for many years. The bowl is inscribed: "Lizzie Swansea Museum" and was made at Ewenny Pottery of red clay with a yellow glaze over a white slip. Lizzie stands on the lid of the bowl following the tradition of decorating the lid with an animal or a sheaf of corn. Christmas carol singing grew out of wassailing which in South Wales is associated with the Mari Lwyd

== Development of the area from prehistoric times ==
During the Paleolithic and Mesolithic periods the area to the north of Swansea was covered in an ice sheet from the Last Glacial Period. The ice-free areas were made up of tundra and the winters were severe. The sea level was approximately 80m lower than it is today. This meant that Swansea Bay formed part of a broad valley together with what is now the Bristol Channel, with the coast lying approximately 100 km further to the west of its present location. People lived as hunter-gatherers, and the diet consisted of wild animals, plants, and fish. Animal remains from this period have been found in the caves of Gower, such as Goat's Hole Cave and Bacon Hole Cave (named after the red oxide streaks on the cave walls). These include bison, hyena, elephant, and soft-nosed rhinoceros. Paleolithic stone tools made from flint, were used for food preparation, and have been found in these caves. The incorrectly named Red Lady of Paviland was a male hunter-gatherer from the Upper Paleolithic period who lived during this period and the remains of his skeleton were found in Goat's Hole Cave.

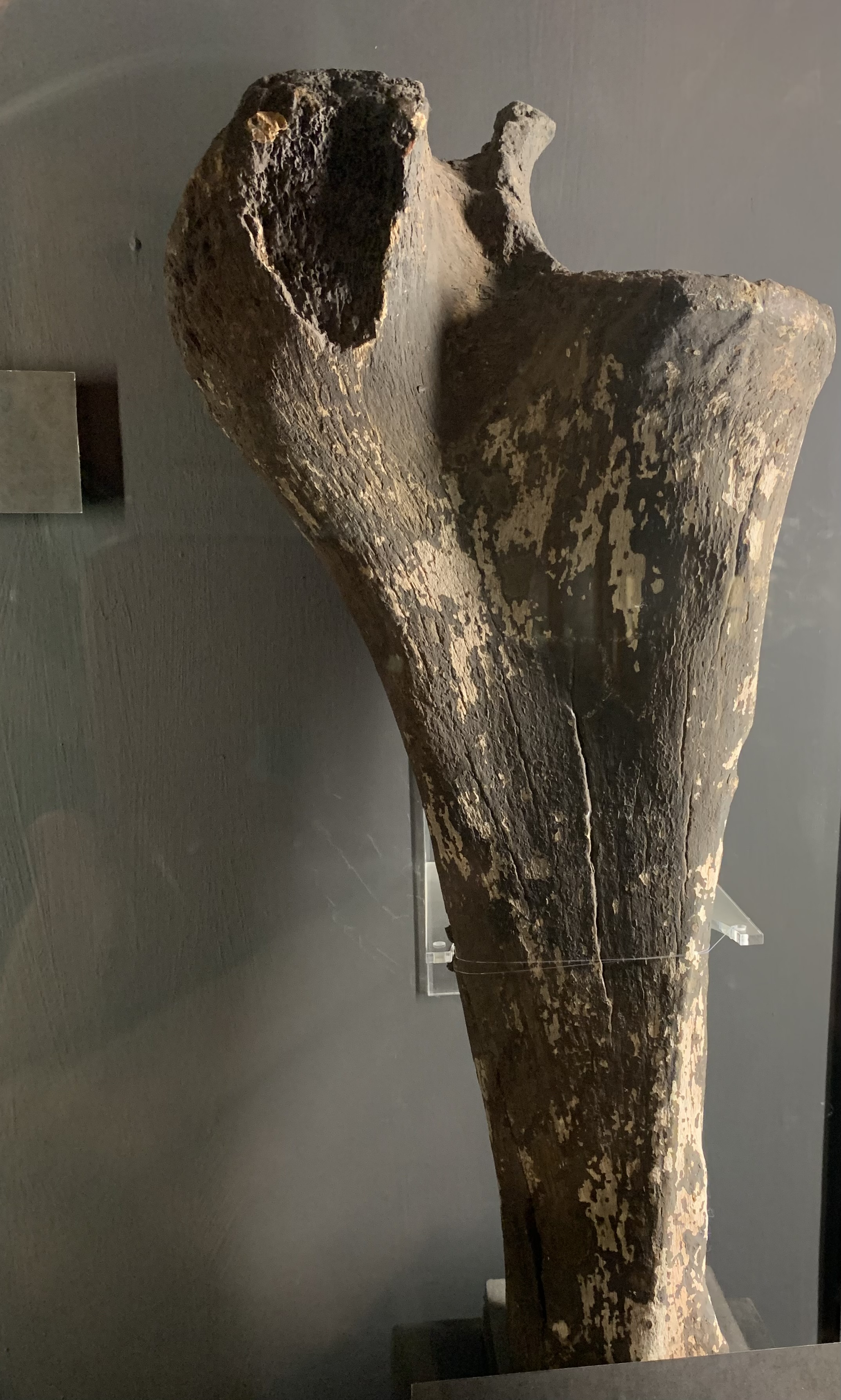
Lower front leg bone of a Mammoth discovered in 1850 at Bacon Hole Cave, Gower and exhibited at Swansea Museum. This was probably hunted in what is now Swansea Bay and eaten by a group of hunter-gatherers

During the Neolithic period, the ice retreated and was replaced by forests of oak, hazel and ash. People sailed to Swansea directly from France in wooden-framed boats covered in animal skin, like a currach. They brought domestic animals with them. These included cattle, pigs, goats, and possibly sheep. These people grew crops, including barley and varieties of wheat, such as emmer and einkorn. However, they also took part in long hunting forays to the upland areas of Glamorgan where Neolithic arrowheads have been found. Some of these people settled at a location near Mount Pleasant, Swansea while others settled in Gower. They cut down the forests to make open areas for grazing and used the wood for heating. Analysis of the charcoal from the Mount Pleasant settlement shows that it was made of hawthorn with some ash, oak, and hazel.

During the early Bronze Age, the climate was warm and dry and there was further immigration by sea, possibly directly from France or through Wessex. Evidence of settlement has been found at West Cross where an early Bronze Age hut, 30m in diameter and made from brushwood, was excavated in 1969. Settlements during this period were on higher ground where heathland had developed because the forest had been cleared. Examples of similar settlement locations include Rhossili Down, Llanmadoc Hill and Cefn Bryn. During this period there is evidence of pastoralism with some wheat and barley cultivation. During the Iron Age, the climate got colder and the soil pH became acidic. This led to settlements relocating from the uplands to coastal hillforts and defended farmhouses which practiced pastoralism with some cultivation.

During the Roman era, which lasted for about 350 years, there is little evidence of Roman settlement in the area, although a Roman villa was built in the grounds of what is now Oystermouth Cemetery. This has the most westerly mosaic found in Britain and suggests a high degree of sophistication and that the owners were thoroughly Roman in culture. However, the main Roman settlements were located around the forts at Loughor Castle (Leucarum) and Neath (Nidum), which lined the east–west route from Cardiff to Carmarthen.

The Romans introduced new foods into Britain, but grain remained the main component of the diet. Excavations at Loughor have revealed three granaries and the grain that was discovered in them includes bread wheat, spelt, emmer and barley, with some rye and oats. Flour was made from the wheat to make bread which was baked in ovens within the fort. Spelt and emmer are not as good for making bread because the husk is more difficult to remove and this makes threshing harder. The granaries at Leucarum supplied Roman soldiers and the local population. During this period farms produced beef, mutton, and goat meat. Fish and seafood was popular, and they cultivated oysters, and made fish sauce, while olive oil, and red wine were imported from the Roman Empire.

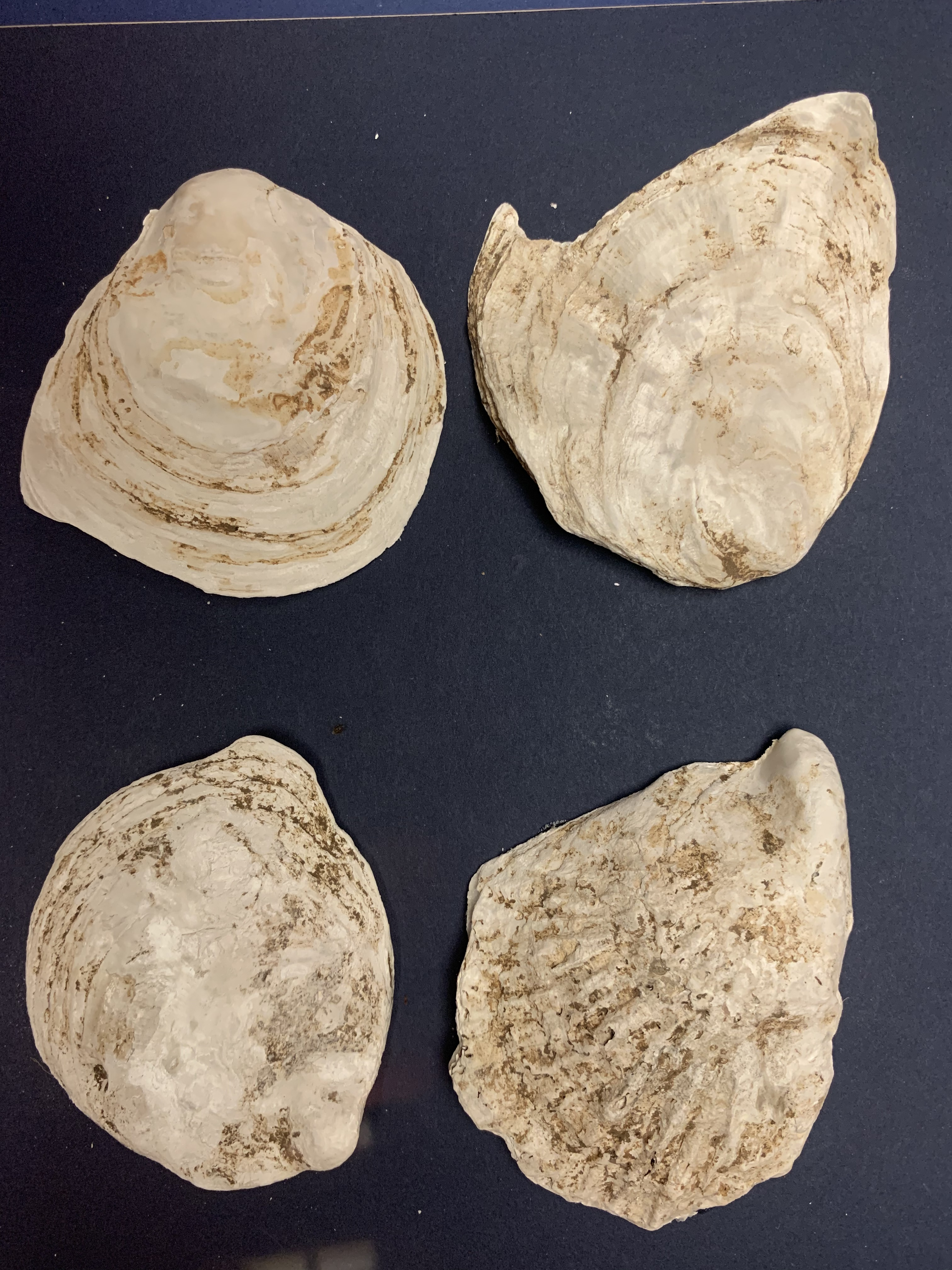
Oyster shells from the Roman period found at Barland Quarry, Gower and exhibited at Swansea Museum

After the Fall of the Western Roman Empire, the region to the north and west of Swansea came under the control of the Deisi, who arrived from Ireland and during the sixth and seventh centuries the Irish language was spoken in this area. However, Swansea itself was settled by the Vikings who created a trading post at the mouth of the River Tawe. The name Swansea is believed to come from the personal name Svein, as a pre-fix, with the suffix '-ey' having been added and referring to an island that may have been located at the mouth of the river Tawe. However, the Welsh name of Abertawe refers to the river mouth on which the settlement occurred, and the Celtic people from the pre-Roman period remained the main population group, with the Viking trading centre being relatively small.

After the Norman Conquest, Motte-and-bailey castles protected the fertile and valley areas which were subject to manorialism, which developed from the Roman villa system of the Late Roman Empire, while the Welsh occupied the less productive highland areas, where sheep were raised, and oats and barley were grown. (Powell, 1584). The Welsh areas were subject to the Laws of Hywel Dda (Cyfraith Hywel), while Swansea was governed by Anglo-Norman overlords, who granted charters listing liberties and privileges. The Norman areas were subject to Welsh raids, most notably in 1136, 1151, 1189 and 1215. The manorial areas were enclosed to make fields for arable land, pasture, and meadows. The main crop was corn, with other crops including wheat, barley, rye, white and grey oats, peas and vetches. Surplus produce was exported to the West Country.

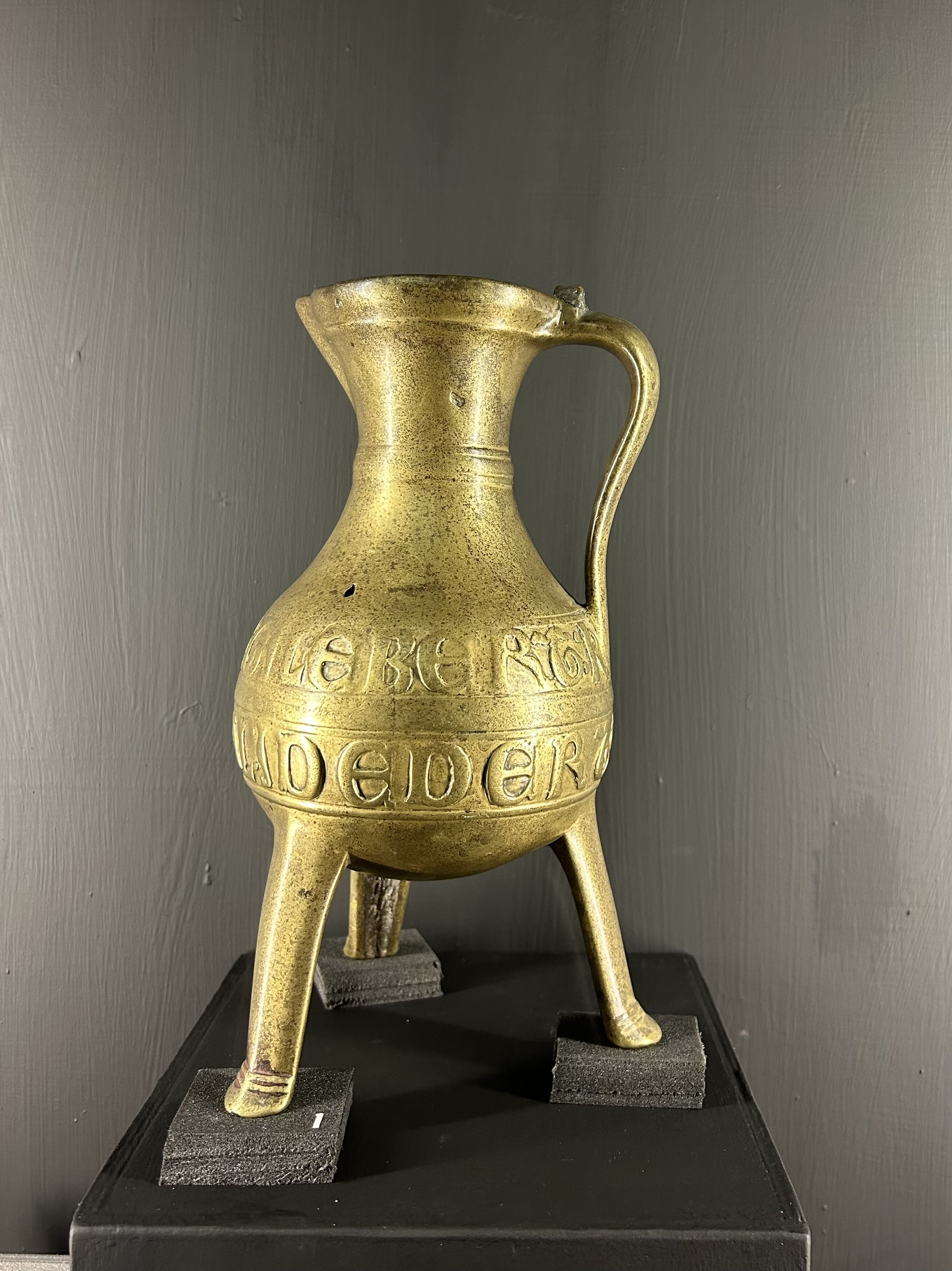
A bronze ewer from the fourteenth century found on Gower. It was probably used during banquets for guests to wash their hands between courses before the invention of forks. It is inscribed in Lombardic capitals with the following words: JE SU LAWR DE GILBERT. KI MEMBERA MAL J DEDERT. (translated: I AM THE EWER OF GILBERT, HE WHO CARRIES ME OFF MAY SUFFER EVIL) The ewer may have belonged to Gilbert de Clare, Earl of Gloucester and Lord of Glamorgan.

During the Industrial Revolution, coal mining and non-ferrous metal industries developed around Swansea and substantial immigration occurred. During this period 45% of Swansea's population was born outside Glamorgan, with people coming from Gower and Carmarthenshire, and the trading areas of the West Country and Ireland. In 1850 the South Wales Main Line from Cardiff to Swansea was completed and this stimulated further population growth. The hamlets and scattered farms associated with subsistence agriculture merged with the settlements that grew unplanned around the coal mines, road junctions and canals because of industrialization. By the twentieth century there were over fifty distinct communities in the Swansea region based on nucleated communities focused on collieries, metal works, chapels, and shopping on local high streets.

However, after World War II, most of central Swansea was destroyed by bombing and rebuilt. With the increasing use of private transport the city functioned as a regional shopping center, leading to a decline in the distinctiveness of surrounding settlements. D. T. Herbert noted that by 1971 the business district of Wind Street and High Street had also declined, as the emphasis within Swansea shifted towards post-war rebuilt areas around Oxford Street and Kingsway. However, Wind Street has since become a popular location for eating and drinking.

== Markets ==
Swansea Market probably originated as early as the twelfth century and was confirmed in 1306 in a Charter given to the men of Gower by William de Braose, 2nd Baron Braose. By the 1530s the Market was described by John Leland (antiquary) as follows: "Swansey...a market town and chief place of Gower lande". The main market day was on a Saturday, although under the 1655 Charter of Oliver Cromwell the market could open two days a week. Evidence of the activities of the Market are shown in cases brought before the Court leet for the sale of goods outside the Market precincts in contravention of the 1306 Charter. The Charter controlled market activities to avoid profiteering. The activity of regrating involved an intermediary acting as a go-between in the sale of goods to make a profit. Although Swansea did not have a butcher in 1739, by 1810 one butcher was charged with forestalling and regrating in contravention of the Charter.

Forestalling referred to the practice of intercepting sellers on their way to a market, buying up their stock, then taking it to the market and selling it at a higher price. This was a type of arbitrage. Another activity was ingrossing, which involved the creation of a monopoly in sales. This occurred during the corn shortage of the mid-1750s, and during this period the market was subject to a royal proclamation against the forestalling and ingrossing of corn and stipulated that between the hours of midday and two o'clock, corn was only to be sold for domestic consumption with bakers and maltsters able to buy in the open market after these hours for commercial use. The problem of forestalling butter led to the creation, in 1765, of a butter market, which was a dedicated open space for the sale of salted butter located in front of Swansea's town hall so that the sale of butter could be controlled.

On market days the town crier would announce publicly to country people arriving in the town that they were not to sell corn, butter, or cheese except in the market and if any was sold before it came to the market the seller would be prosecuted as a forestaller. Additional precautions were taken to control quantities sold, with the 1655 Charter providing for regulation of the weights and measures based on the Winchester measure. The clerk of the market, known as a portreeve, was responsible for weights and measures and by 1785 had a "mawn" in which he put bread which was considered to be "short of weight".

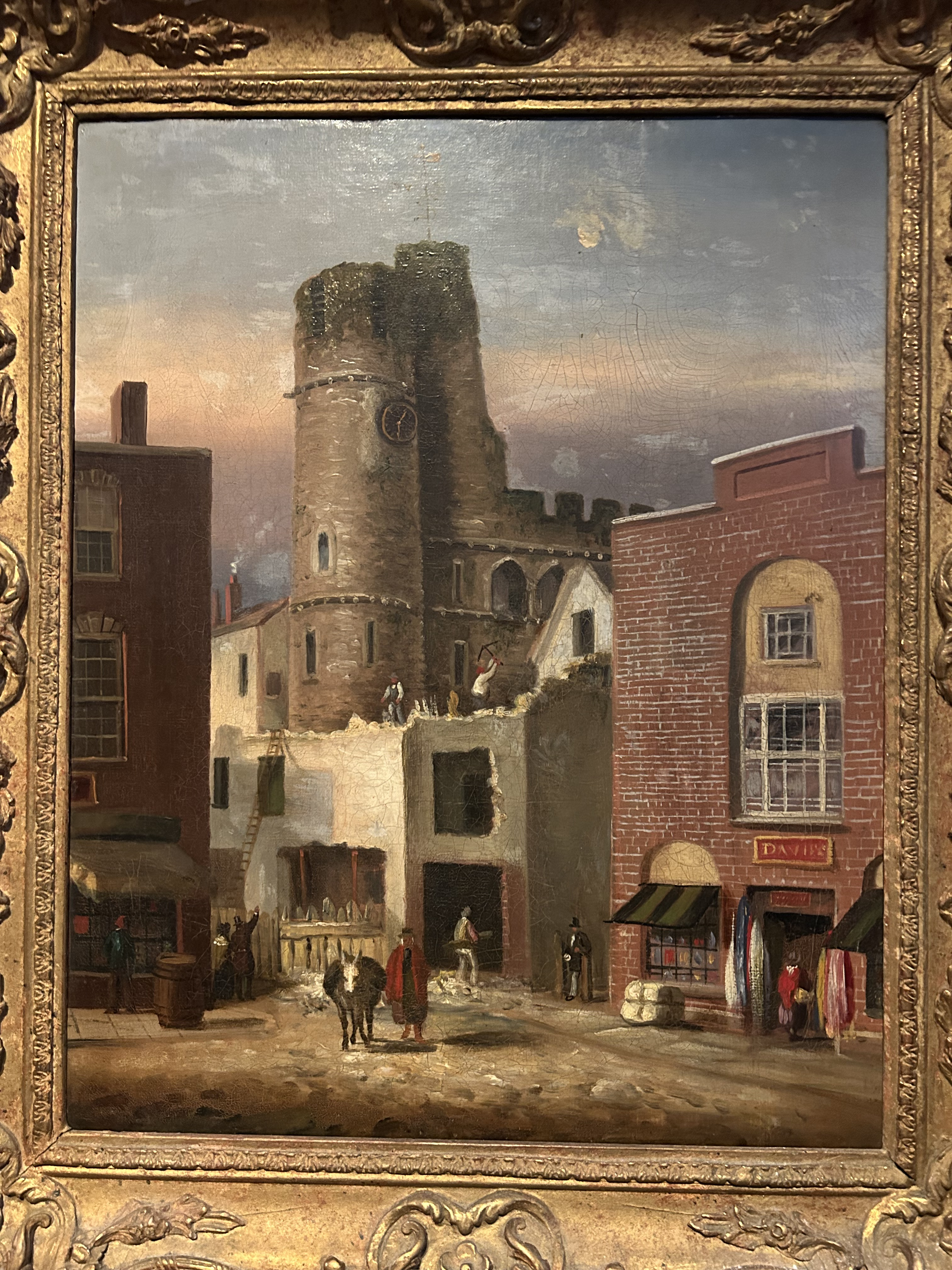
A painting of Swansea Castle, with the original market square in front, painted in 1840 by an unknown artist and forming part of the collection of Swansea Museum

The old market was held at Market Square (now called Castle Square), next to Swansea Castle with the market stalls spread out around the square and down Wind Street, with one narrow street being called Potato Street because it was mainly occupied by potato dealers on market day. A market house had been completed by 1652, and this had ten, simple columns of the Doric order with a lead roof on timber beams. This remained the location of the market until, in 1829, when a new market was built in Oxford Street. This was mainly open-air but was surrounded by a perimeter wall and had a clock tower with a copper roof. The market tables were sheltered by a roof on cast iron pillars. From this time onwards, the market operated daily.

The strong relationship between Gower and Swansea Market is reflected in the views of Ernest Richards, a farmer from Horton, Gower, who was interviewed in 1948:

oh, ay, we reckon Swansea Market belongs as much to we as to Swansea. 'Tis often said about here that it started in a field that was given to the Gower people to sell their produce in. We got a pretty full busload comin' in on a Saturday mornin'. Very near three ton from Llangenny alone...

The horse-drawn omnibuses that were in use in the 1890s were "in summer, the heaped baskets of flowers, and vegetables gave to the vehicle an almost festive air".

Harry Secombe recalls Swansea Market in the 20th century as follows:

As a young boy growing up in Swansea, there was no greater treat on a Saturday afternoon than to go shopping with my mother in the Swansea Market.

It was a wonderful place – a veritable Aladdin's Cave, redolent with the smell of fresh bread, cockles, laverbread, faggots and peas. The odour of new leather from the rows of football boots hanging by their laces mingling with the sugary perfumes of the mounds of toffees, marzipan, bonbons and hard-boiled sweets in all sorts of shapes, from goldfish to pineapples on the confectionery stalls. It was enough to make a young lad swoon with ecstasy."

In the 1920s Swansea Market had 670 stalls and many Gower farms sold meat, fruit, and vegetables. Reflecting the importance of Gower to the production of food, The Reverend J. D. Davies, in his "A History of West Gower" (Vol IV, 1894) writes as follows:

But we must remember that the population of Swansea in 1664 was very small; in 1563 it only amounted to about 900 inhabitants; so that in point of fact, as a center for feeding purposes, and the disposal of commodities of every kind, the market at Penrice was even more necessary for the inhabitants of west Gower than Swansea was, and infinitely more convenient, when we remember the state of the roads, and the absence of wheeled vehicles. Time and circumstances have, however, so altered the condition of things, that at the present day, Swansea, with its 100,000 inhabitants, consumes the whole produce of the Peninsula, and a great deal more besides.

== Notability for food ==
According to Keenan:

there are first class Chefs, excellent restaurants and a wealth of fresh produce, but nowhere in the Principality can boast such a concentration of all these things as Swansea

Keenan believes that "the Swansea food scene" evolved because local chefs and cooks moved away to London and Europe to develop their skills and gain "greater experience, knowledge and confidence", then returned home to cook "better than ever before." He comments that these chefs became "leading lights" in the Swansea restaurant scene and trained a younger generation of cooks, and "attracted new talent into the area."

Keenan comments that:

Cockles and Laverbread have been a staple dish long seen on many menus, they are a cherished part of our culinary heritage, and will continue to be so, yet with the experience and expertise of the people within the industry, we are now moving forward, and gaining recognition for a far wider cuisine.

He comments that competition between restaurants is high with customers being "knowledgeable and demanding", and with local produce featuring on many menus. He comments that the Gower Peninsula and Pembrokeshire are areas which supply local produce.

Since prehistory Swansea has been a place where people have settled and is now a cosmopolitan city due to the many people connected with Swansea University, industry, and tourism. Keenan comments:

I love to keep an open mind and experiment with new dishes and ideas, making as much use as I can of local produce, then treating them with the influences from all over the world and learning as I go helps me develop further as a Chef, as I feel if you have an open mind, you will never stop learning.

== Seafood ==
Before World War II, Swansea was one of the leading British fishing ports, with fish being sent to Billingsgate Fish Market, and the other major cities, including Manchester, Liverpool and Leeds and with an export trade to France. Special fish wagons were hooked on to the rear of express trains leaving Swansea, and these were loaded with fish after the fish auction had ended.

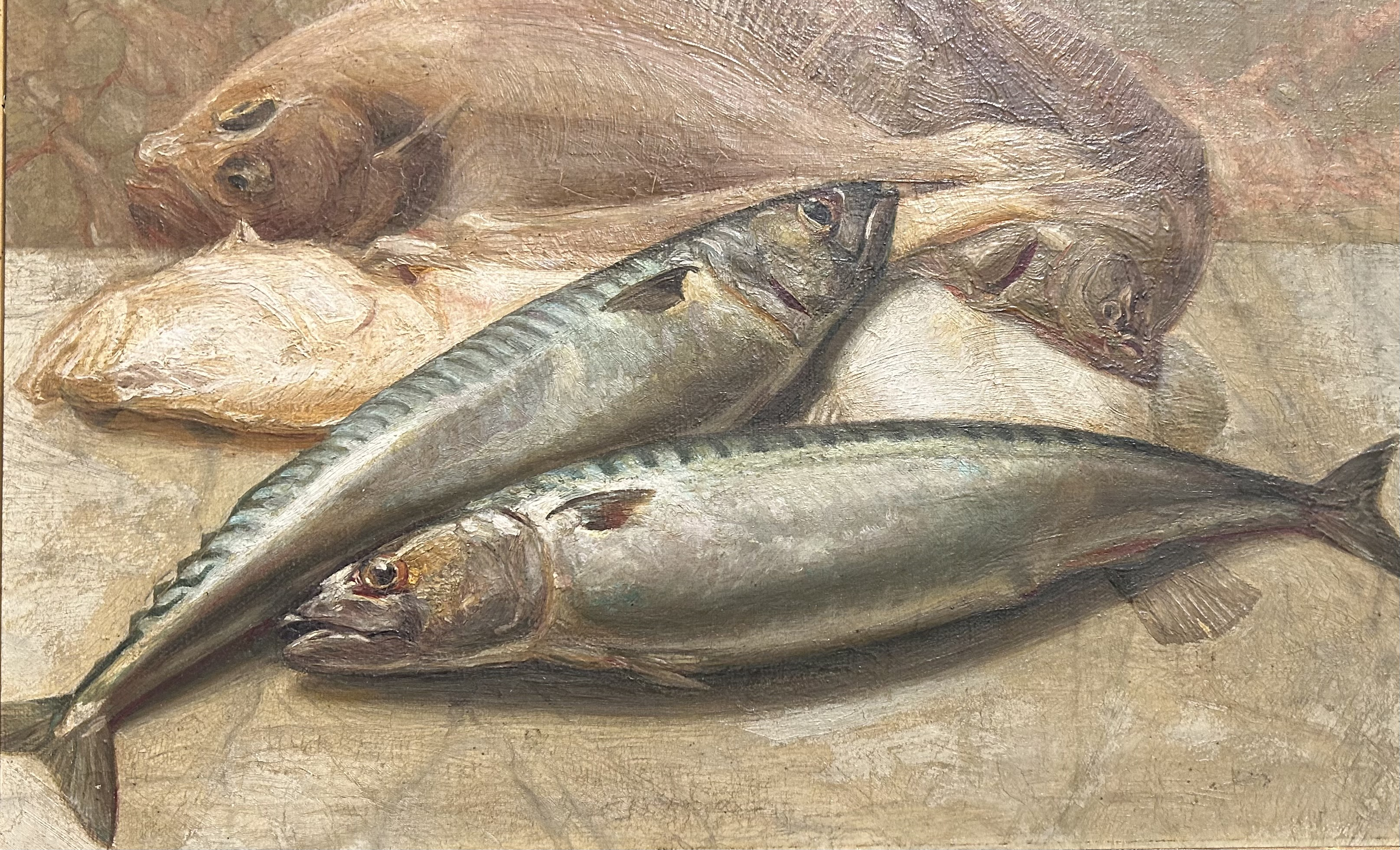
Still life study of fish", c1911 an oil painting on canvas by Evan Walters (1893–1951) at the Glynn Vivian Art Gallery. The painting depicts a still life composition of mackerel and plaice

Swansea employed up to 600 people in commercial fishing during its heyday, and the main fishing grounds were located off the south coast of Ireland around the Shannon Estuary. However, overfishing depleted the fish stocks and the Swansea fishing fleet was relocated to Grimsby by its owners, Consolidated Fisheries, who were from there.

Francis Green, from Coakley Green Fishmongers, of Swansea Market recalled the importance of Swansea as a fishing port as follows:

I remember with a little nostalgia the old Swansea Fish Market on the South Dock, which is now the Swansea Marina, and the fleet of trawlers named after famous Welsh Castles, Conway, Caerphilly, and Oystermouth to name but a few. They were sturdy vessels fuelled by coal, there was something strangely romantic about them.... I became fascinated with the fish market on the South Dock, the hustle and bustle, water, and ice everywhere, the smell of fresh fish being landed. The fish itself had bright eyes, firm flesh, looked good, exciting, with a smell hard to describe as it smacked of the sea.

Green recalled the type of fish landed at Swansea during the twentieth century as follows:

The sea coast of Shannon was a big fishery for hake, the fishermen brought back tons of it, as well as megrim, plaice and cod, but hake was the number one fish caught. That is why the Swansea housewife became orientated to hake and gave it to her family; this influence still prevails today. On the fish market in the 1930s it sold for 3 pence per pound, compared with £2 per pound today, even more for jumbo cutlets.

Swansea now has smaller fishing vessels that catch plaice, skate, and whiting and sea bass, which is considered "the finest fish of all", is available in the summer. In addition, Gower supplies Swansea Market with crab and lobster "which are always in demand".

There are two specialities associated with Swansea: Laverbread and Cockles. Mason & Brown comment that "The Welsh have the most persistent tradition of laver gathering and eating" and note that "it is associated with the food habits of South Wales and is eaten to a lesser extent in north Devon and Scotland." Laverbread remains common along most shores of western Britain and in 1932 Florence White wrote that it was well known in London "before the invasion of French chefs in 1848". In Swansea, the laver is mixed with oatmeal and fried in bacon fat for breakfast but Mason notes that laver heated with butter and the juice of Seville oranges was a classic Victorian era sauce for roast mutton.

Mason & Brown comment that laver is gathered from the rocks at low tide at any time of the year but the harvest can be made more difficult by storms and changes in the level of sand on the beach. It must then be washed in water up to 7 times to remove sand and grit, then it is steeped in fresh water to reduce saltiness, after that some bicarbonate of soda is added to counteract any bitterness. The seaweed fronds are then stewed in their own moisture for up to 7 hours until they become a soft purée. The excess water is drained, and the final product is ready.

Cerys Matthews, whose family moved to Swansea when she was seven, recommends buying Laverbread in paste form, and preferably in glass jars, explaining the distinction between laver, which is seaweed, and Laverbread, which is boiled seaweed. Matthews goes on to explain:

Laver harvesting is thought to be an ancient custom, the seaweed being common around the British and Irish coast. I once tried picking it from the beach and preparing my own. You have to boil it for hours: I made a total mess, so feel no qualms about buying it ready prepared now. I love its distinct texture and taste; it spells holidays to me and is full of minerals and iron.

Matthews has a recipe for Laverbread and Cockles, which includes the addition of oats and salted butter. The cockles are rinsed in cold water. Any that do not shut when tapped against a dish, or which have a broken shell are discarded and the remainder are then cooked in “a splash of water” in a covered pan until they open. Any closed cockles are then removed. The oats give body and the amount of oats added can be varied to alter the consistency.

A Swansea Breakfast is made up of laverbread and cockles, together with finely chopped onions, slices of back bacon, black pepper, and lemon juice. Vegetable oil is added to a large frying pan and then the chopped onions are added and fried for 3–4 minutes. The cockles are added and then the laverbread is mixed in. The black pepper and lemon juice are then added, and the mixture is cooked for fifteen minutes. The breakfast can be served on thick toast and is said to provide a "delicious and healthy breakfast" but can also be served at any time as a light snack. A Swansea Breakfast has been described as bringing "the essence of the Welsh coast directly to you, wherever you might be" and as "a trip to the seaside for your mouth".

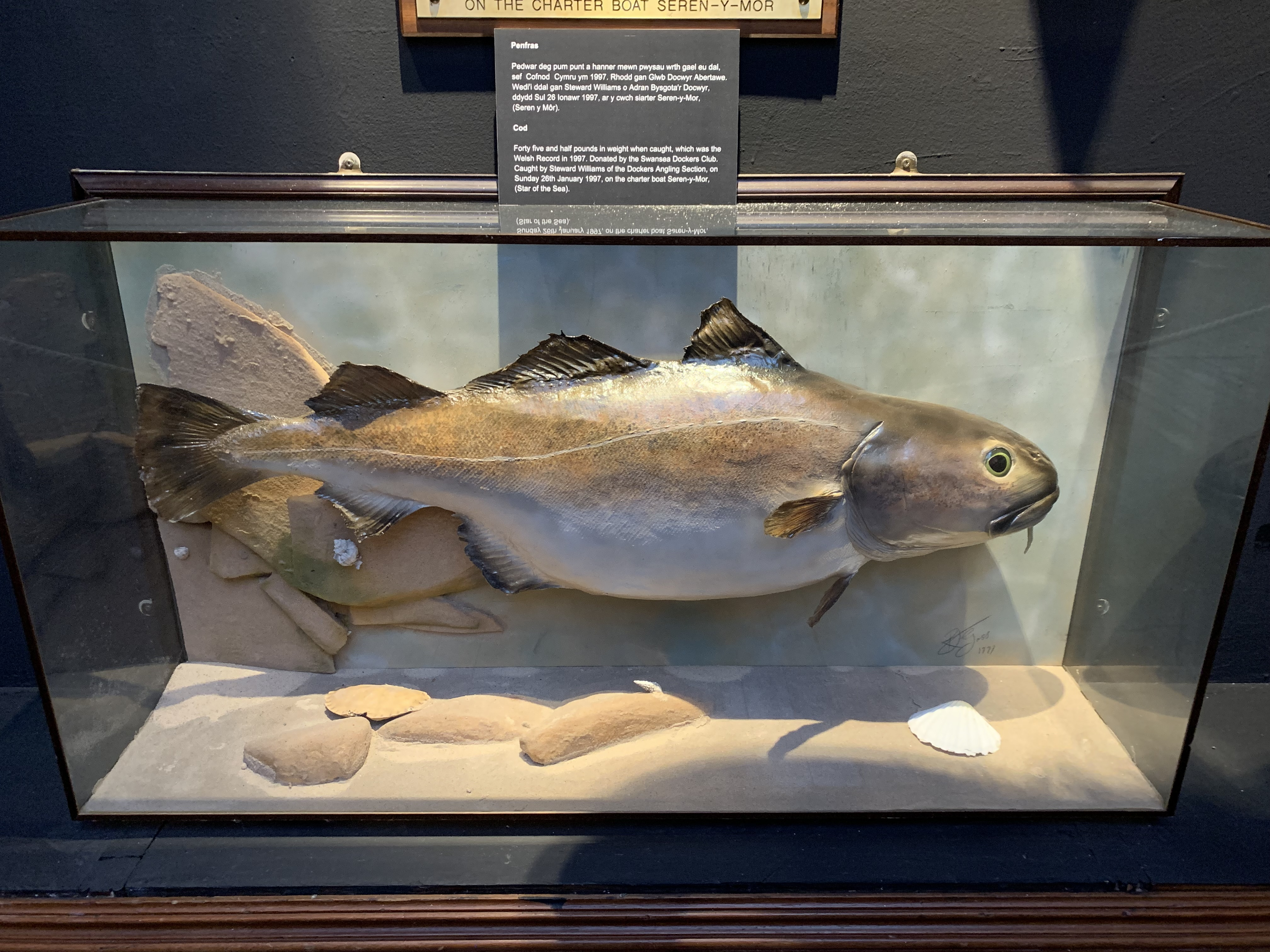
Cod caught by Steward Williams of Swansea Dockers Club in Swansea Bay on 26 January 1997; at 45.5 pounds in weight it was a Welsh record (exhibited at Swansea Museum)

== Meat and pies ==
The Welsh pig has been a key component of the diet in Wales and pork can be found at butchers in Swansea.

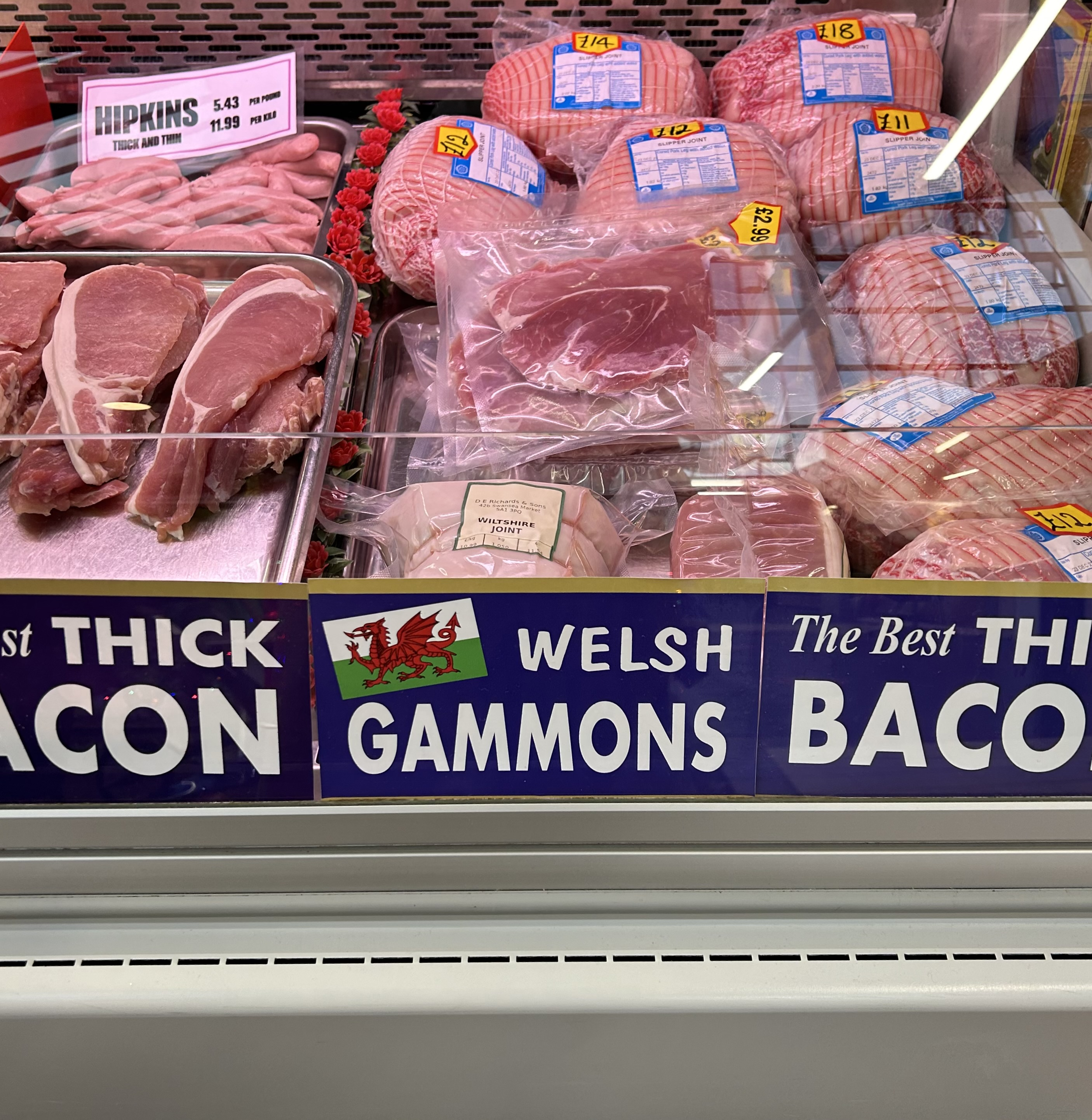
Welsh gammon steaks on sale at Swansea Market

Mason & Brown note the saltiness of Welsh pork and go on to explain its origins as follows:

The distinctive features of Welsh bacon, the fat and salt, would not have been so remarkable in the past. It was generally considered desirable for pigs to be very fat, and a heavy salt cure was employed to ensure preservation when control of hygiene and temperature were less than certain. The development of lighter cures, demands for leaner meat, worries about the consumption of saturated fat and the death of the tradition of home curing have led to the disappearance of this type of bacon except in West Wales, where it is still much favoured."

Welsh back bacon can be grilled or fried and has a distinctive taste which complements the local cuisine. It adds flavour to cooked vegetables, such as leeks and potatoes, and can be added to cawl. Mason & Brown note that "Bacon fat is the customary medium for heating laverbread." The bacon of West Wales consists of "thin, dark red streaks of lean, in a white fat layer" and it can be compared to other types of bacon, such as Wiltshire bacon which uses the more modern technique of curing, where less salt is added and, instead, brine is used to cure the meat.

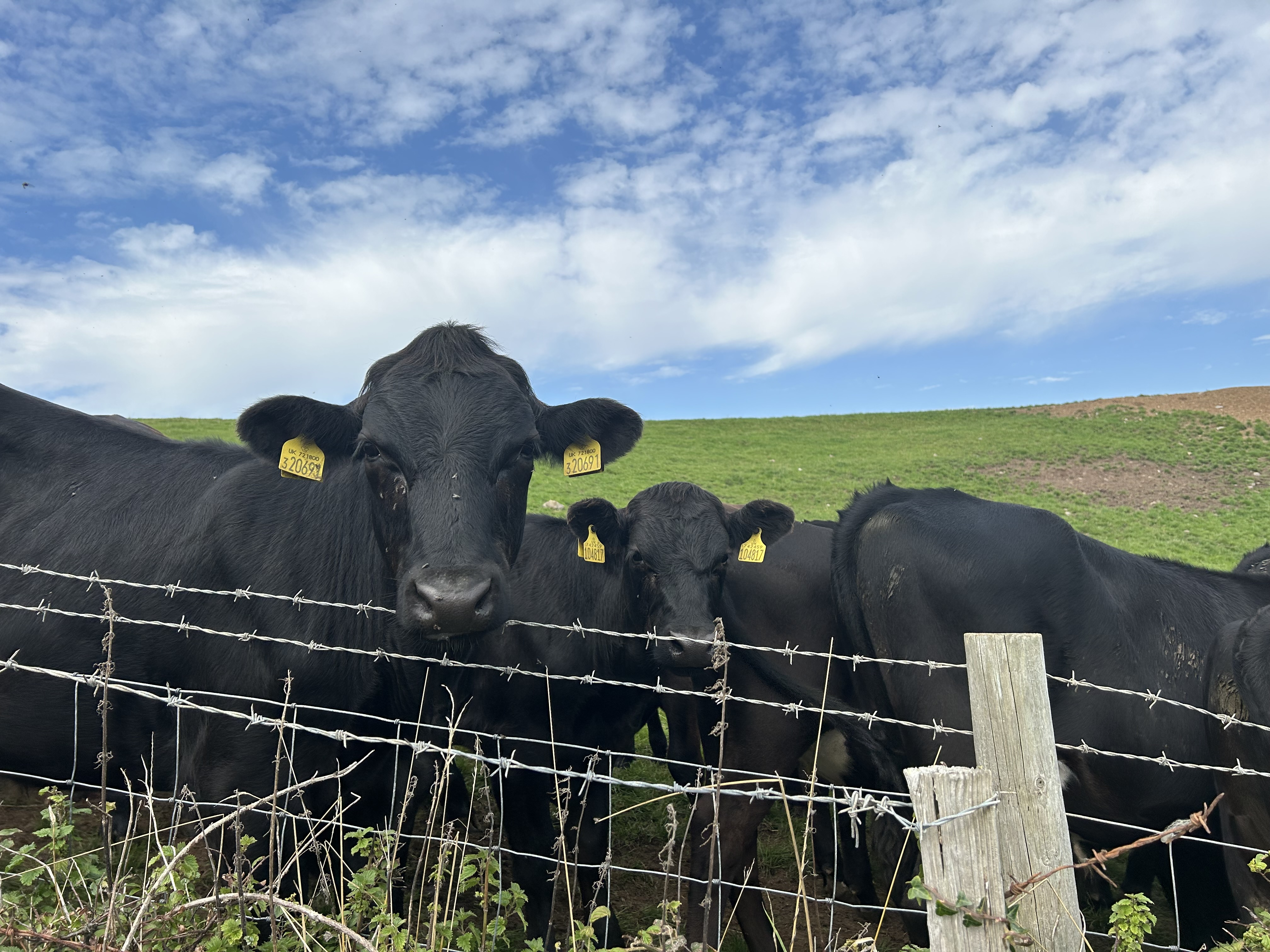
Welsh Black cattle, near Paviland, Gower

Writing about Welsh beef, Colin Pressdee comments:

Traditional Welsh black beef cattle ..... were small dark animals, but with exceptional strength. They foraged for a wide variety of foods and hence developed very flavoursome meat. Although much of lowland Wales is best known for dairy cattle, the vales of Glamorgan, Carmarthen, Pembroke and Anglesey, with their fine pastures, produce exceptional quality beef.

Pressdee also writes about Welsh lamb and comments that:

In Wales, the cooks are presented with very individual flavours in every region, which also vary as the seasons progress. Young lamb has a sweet and mild-flavoured offal that is ideal for a light spring casserole, particularly if warmth of flavour is still required in a meal for a cold April day.

Swansea market is known for its salt marsh lamb which is raised on the salt marsh of the Burry Inlet and Loughor Estuary. Pressdee comments:

In Normandy, salt marsh lamb, known as pre-sale lamb, is a great specialty, particularly around the famous abbey of Mont St Michel. It is not sold with the same distinction in Wales. But local butchers will be able to advise you on the origin of the lamb, whether mountain, farm, or salt marsh.

However, the reputation of Welsh salt marsh lamb has grown in recent years. It has recently been awarded Protected designation of origin status and can be found for sale at butchers in Swansea. Pressdee writes that "the finest local Welsh lamb and beef" can be found at Swansea Market.

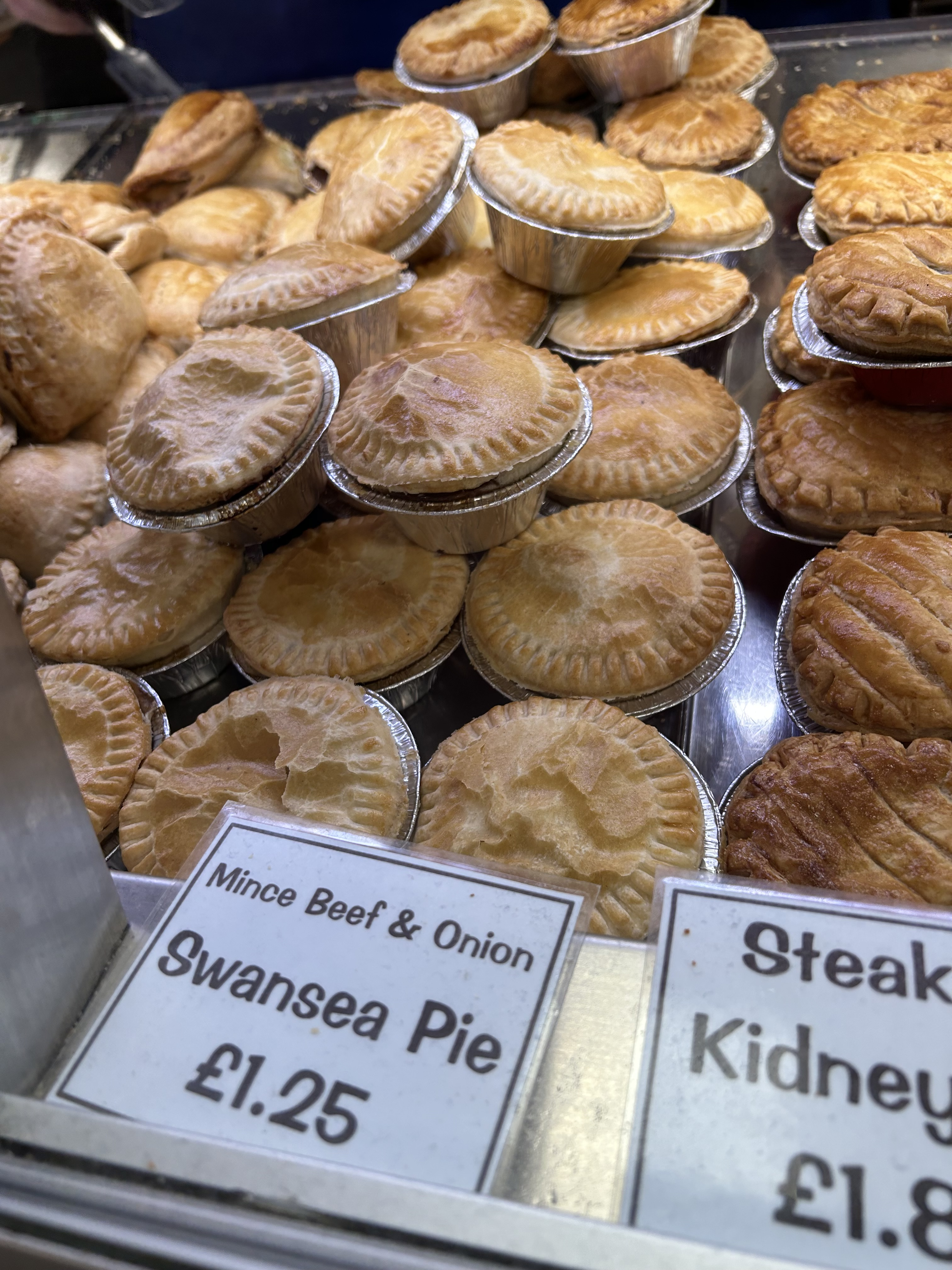
Swansea pies on sale at Swansea Market

Swansea also has distinctive varieties of meat pie. The Swansea pie has been described by the Great British Food Awards as follows:

A rich combination of minced beef, onion and gravy – this pie is a little parcel of joy. It's the perfect snack to fortify you before an afternoon of shopping, exploring, or a trip to the pub!

Lewis Pies was established in Swansea in 1936 by the Lewis family. They use local ingredients to produce pies, pastries, and other products. In describing the challenges of running a family business, and developing a premium product, Wilf Lewis, the third generation of family pie makers described to a business magazine how his grandfather started making pies:

He started the business in a very small property in the Sandfields, Swansea. He started with one van, driving around to local shops and with three or four pies and a pasty, that's largely how the business looked..."

Lewis's father went on to expand the business in the "van age" when:

Everyone had a milkman and a pie man, and my dad was running vans across South Wales and Bristol serving chip shops and that type of business.

Another popular local pie is the Corned beef pie. As one commentator noted:

Corned beef may have lost its popularity since the 19th Century and World War two. But in some pockets of the UK, particularly South Wales, and old working-class communities, it is still a beloved favourite that usually reminds us of a parent or grandparent... In fact, our love of corned beef goes so far in South Wales, that the major bakery chain (Greggs) even sells corned beef pasties, but you won't find this on their website, or in stores past Bristol...I'm not sure as to whether they also serve them up North, but certainly, in the South, it's a Welsh thing... The vast majority of bakeries in South Wales serve delicious corned beef pasties for a lunchtime treat, if you visit Swansea Market the bakeries make dozens and dozens of corned beef pasties, far outweighing other flavours to satisfy our taste for them... As a Swansea girl myself, I remember the shock and horror of moving to Cornwall, that the fabulous bakery Barnecutt's (or any other for that matter) did not serve a single corned beef pasty!... It's something you remember your Mum or Grandmother making and brings back fond memories. It's also fairly cheap to make and freezes and reheats well.

Swansea's Victoria Park has a kiosk and a small café run by Swansea Council which is known for its Corned beef pie. The café also provides supervised opportunities for adults to develop their employment skills and confidence.

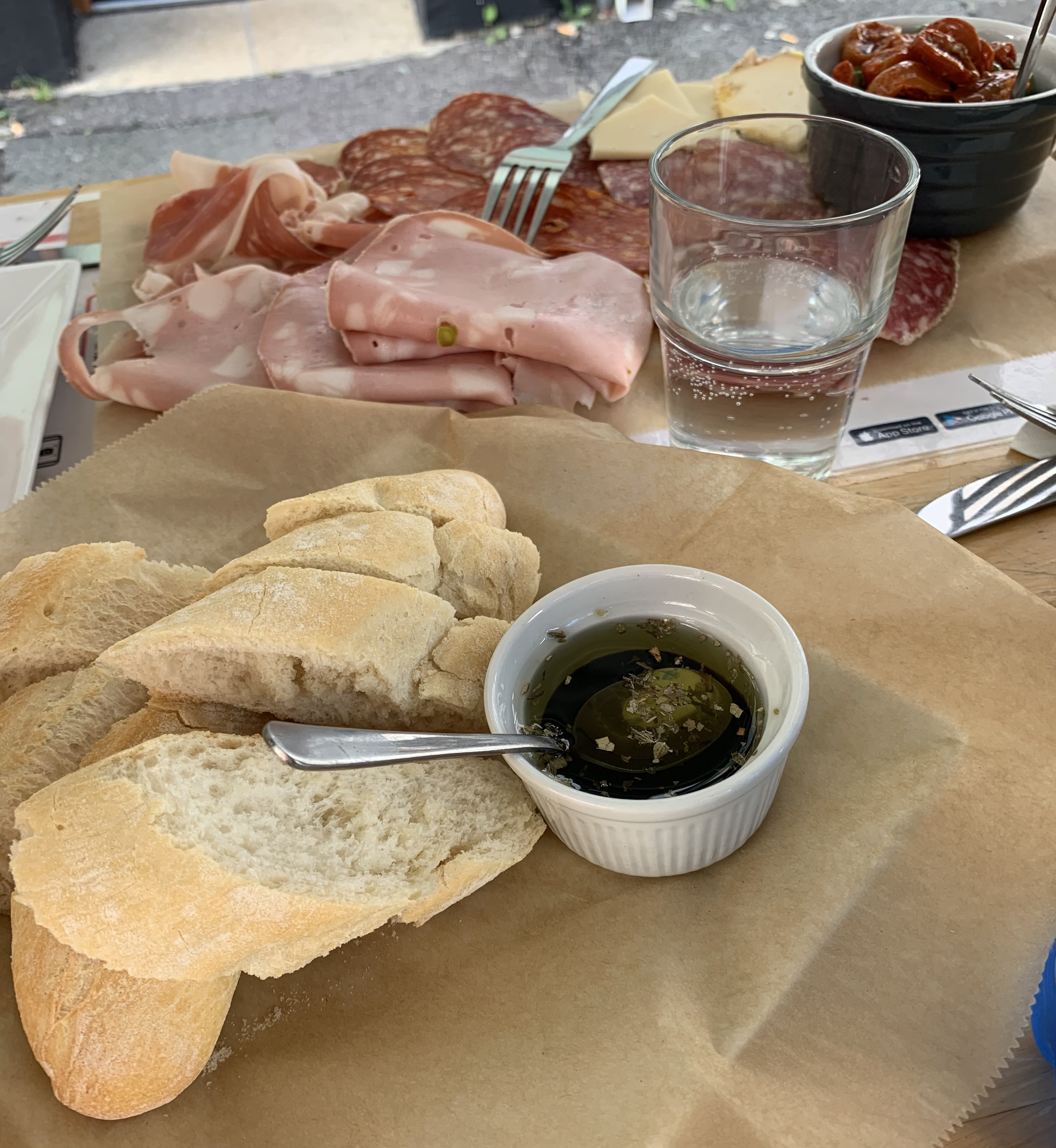
A selection of bread, ham and condiments from an Italian café in Swansea

== Bread and cakes ==
Up until the early 20th century corn from Gower would be used by Swansea's bakeries to make bread. The Gower flourmills operated from the Middle Ages and most were located around Llanrhidian. They were owned by generations of families who milled corn, such as the Willis family who owned the Nether Mill, Llanrhidian for six generations. The Nether Mill had two pairs of millstones, one for rough grain and one for fine flour.

Thomas John Willis commented in 1932:

“not so long ago Gower-milled wheat could be obtained in Swansea, and there was a restaurant in High Street that specialised in bara gwenith which was bread baked from the wholemeal of Gower”

Gower farmers would bring bags of wheat, corn, and barley to the Gower mills for milling and then collect the flour. Nether Mill had a waterwheel of 18 feet which was the largest in Gower. Willis goes on to recall the days when every farmer grew enough corn for home consumption and had a surplus for market.

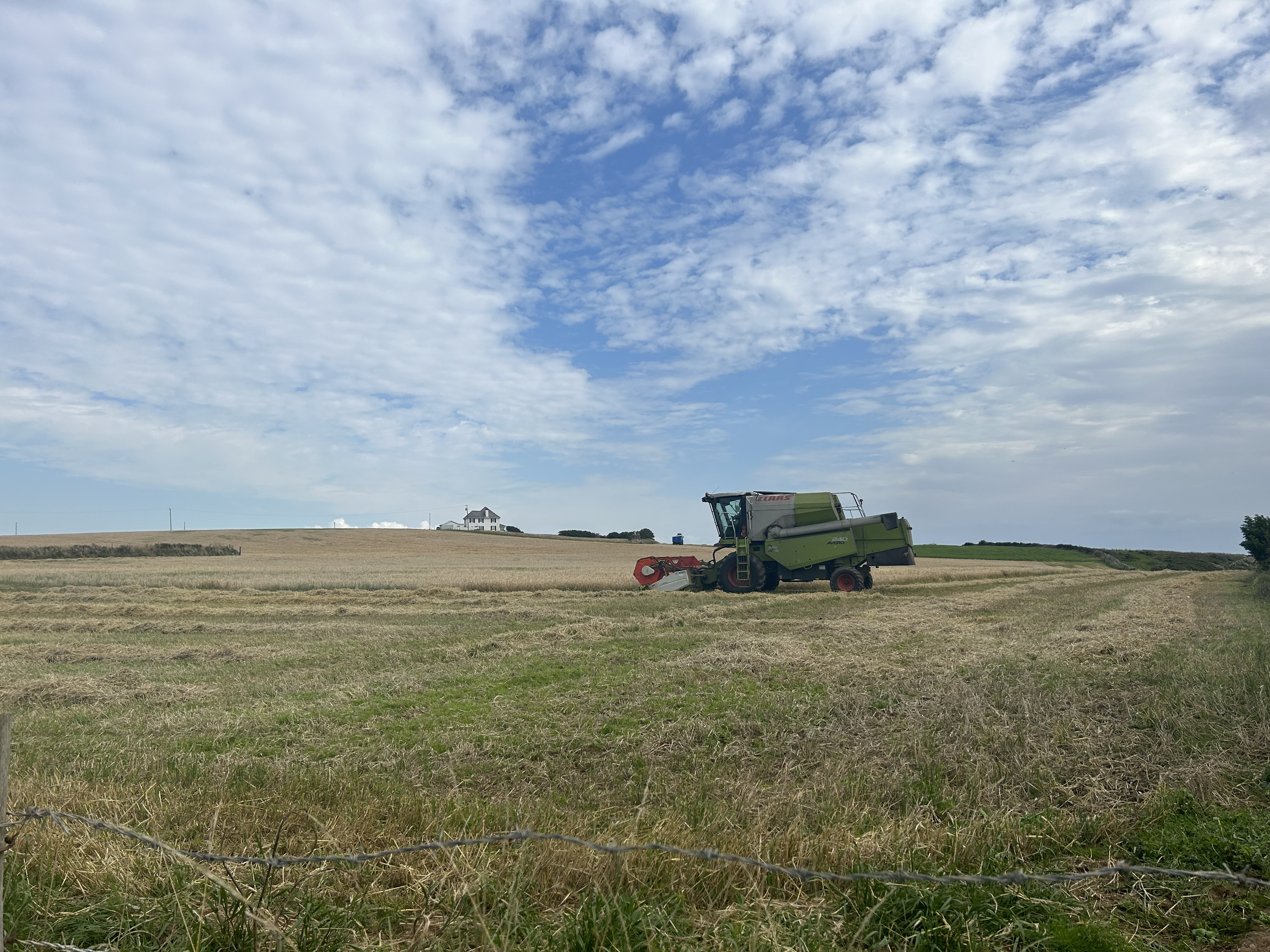
A combine harvester in a field near Rhossili, Gower

In the 1890s it would take four hours to get to Swansea from Llanrhidian in a horse and gambo and corn would be cut with a scythe and tied into sheaves. However, by the 1940s the combine harvester was used to cut the wheat, thrash it, and collect the grain. During World War II the Nether Mill worked 24 hours a day to satisfy the demand for flour. However, milling in Gower was discontinued during the 1950s when the Nether Mill, which was the last of the Gower mills, ceased to be profitable.

Swansea has its own variety of bread known as the Crusty Swansea. Mason & Brown describe its characteristics as follows:

A large round or oval loaf, slashed across the top with 3 diagonal cuts; 200mm diameter, 120-130mm high. Weight: about 800g. Colour and texture: a thick, slightly tough, well-baked crust, gold to dark brown, with a rough, irregular surface; white crumb, fairly close textured with a few irregular large holes.

Mason & Brown explain that:

the name Swansea is generally recognized in South Wales for this type of bread....Little is known about their history beyond an oral tradition of long usage. Their shape is closely related to the bloomer loaf, a similar but more elongated crusty, oven-bottom loaf with about eight diagonal cuts on top made in much of southern England.

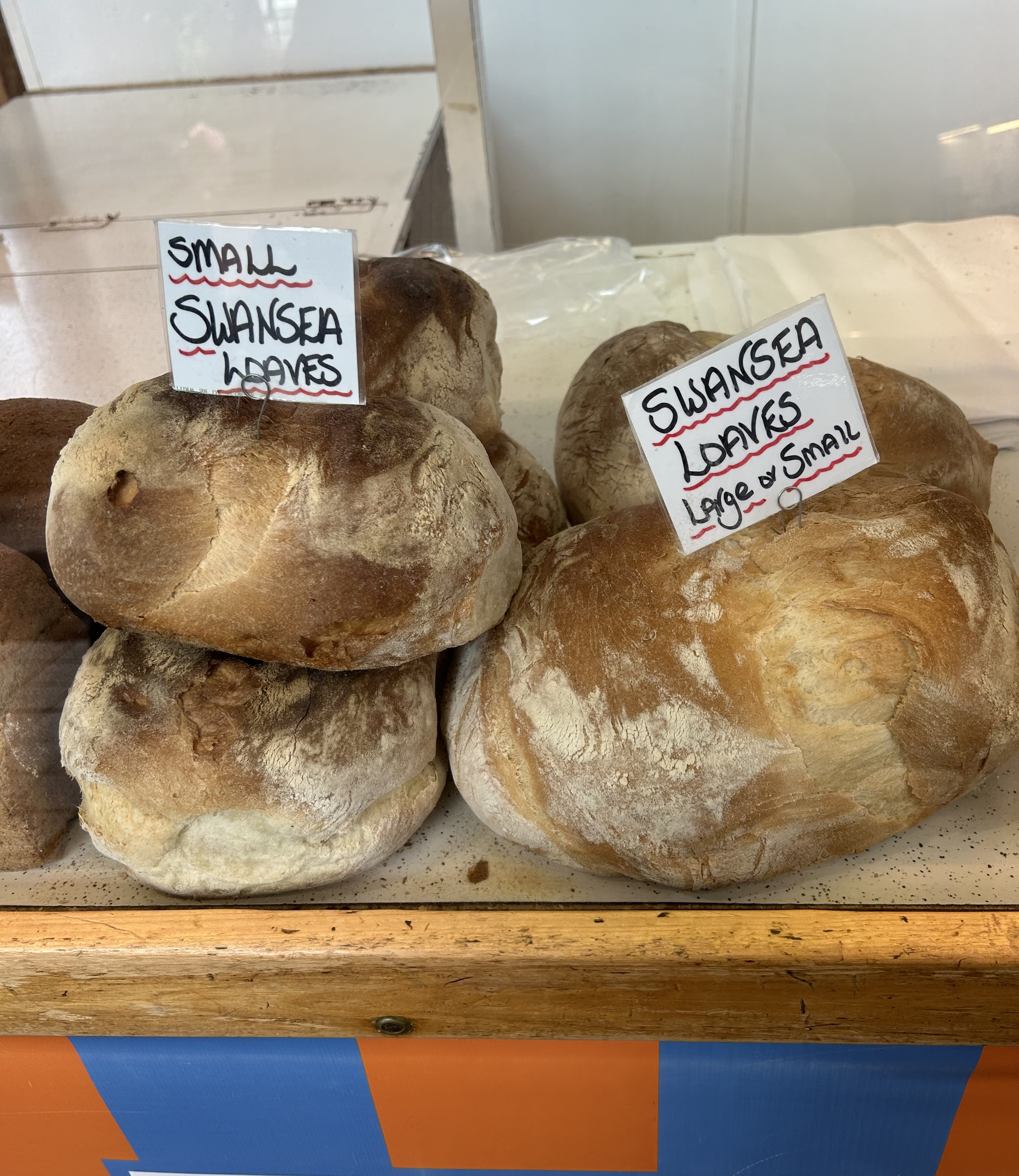
Crusty Swansea loaves on sale at Swansea Market

They explain that the technique used to make a traditional Crusty Swansea is to "set" a yeast sponge, although conventional white bread dough can also be used. The loaves are then shaped into ovals after fermentation, the joins of any folds are left on the underside and after final proof cuts are made in the top crust.

Laura Mason notes:

Another unusual feature [of Welsh cuisine] is the planc, which was originally a flat piece of iron, like a griddle, balanced over an open fire. Electrically heated versions can be seen in action in Swansea Market, for baking Welsh cakes. The planc was also used for other things – pancakes and pikelets, relatively large loaves made from conventional bread dough, and pastry turnovers filled with fruit, the sugar added after cooking to prevent the juices bubbling out.

Welsh cakes can be bought off the planc from the stalls in the central section of Swansea Market. Cerys Matthews has a recipe for vegan Welsh Cakes, where she replaces the butter with vegetable oil and egg and uses a binding agent of ground chia.

Until the gas or electric stove became common, most Welsh households would have owned a planc. One of the traditional products to be produced on the planc was a small bread known as the Crempog. As Mason notes:

These little breads were made on the planc, an iron baking sheet that every Welsh household possessed. They were also known as leicecs or lightcakes and were a teatime tradition in parts of north and central Wales.

S. Minwel Tibbott has documented the change in Welsh cuisine that accompanied the introduction of the electric stove and devotes a chapter to this phenomenon in her book. The Crempog is still made in Wales around Shrove Tuesday and is a Welsh alternative to the pancake, which gives it the alternative name of Welsh Pancake. Mason & Brown describe the Swansea Crempog as follows:

In Swansea, circular pancakes are rolled into a long cigar shape, elsewhere they are left flat; the edges are irregular. Pancakes made in Swansea are 120mm diameter and 7-8mm thick in the middle, thinning slightly toward the edges. Flat pancakes are 120-170mm diameter. A pancake of 120mm diameter weighs about 50g; one of 170mm is 100-125g. Colour: the proportion of white, very lightly cooked batter to pale gold patches, where the pancake has touched the griddle, is variable. In Swansea, white predominates, and the pancakes look smooth; further west they are an even brown and the surface is full of tiny holes. When currants are added, they are invariably in a tight cluster in the centre of the pancake. Flavour and texture: very lightly sweetened, with a slightly eggy flavour. Sometimes lemon is added.

Mason & Brown comment that "the habit of rolling them up now found in Swansea is a revival of an old custom, other bakers leave pancakes flat." Crempogs are usually made from milk, although buttermilk was traditional and cream would be used for special occasions at home. If they are served as a savoury dish, they can be stacked in layers and filled with fish or cheese, heated, and then cut into quarters to give four servings. The crempog has become less common as a home baked item due to the change in domestic lifestyles. Tibbott notes that they were a luxury item eaten with afternoon tea and would be served warm with butter and homemade jam. Because they were easily made and could be produced quickly, they could be baked after the arrival of an unexpected guest.

Some other aspects of Welsh cuisine have also become less common; Mason notes that oats have suffered a decline in popularity:

Until the early 20th century oats were an important cereal in Wales, as in other upland areas of Britain, but the habit of using them to make oatcakes, dumplings, flummery and various drinks seems to have vanished.

Mason's view echoes the comments of Augusta Hall, Baroness Llanover a century earlier (see Cuisine of Monmouthshire). Llanover lamented the loss of the oat kilns which were not maintained and had fallen into disrepair in Monmouthshire, unlike in Scotland.

Flummery, or Llymru, is almost unknown as a food in 21st century Wales. Matthews comments that it is:

a jelly dessert made from oats. Flummery is a good word. But it's not my favourite dessert, so we'll pass on that recipe.

Tibbott has collected a number of traditional recipes for oat-based foods and these are found in her book Welsh Fare, which can be found on the web site of the St Fagans National Museum of History. However, there has been renewed academic interest in the dietary importance of oats during the 21st century. Between 2014 and 2020, Swansea University was a participant in the "Healthy Oats" project which was a joint Irish-Welsh Interreg project to assess new climate-resilient varieties. According to the project, researchers aimed to: “... work with agricultural communities and stakeholders to promote the health, economic and environmental benefits of growing oats – a crop which is ideally suited to the climate of Wales and Ireland." The project brought together scientists from Swansea University, University College Dublin as lead organisations and Teagasc (Ireland's Agriculture and Food Development Authority) with the Institute of Biological, Environmental and Rural Sciences of Aberystwyth University. The Healthy Oats project was part of a European Territorial Co-operation (ETC) programme between 2014 and 2020 and identified that certain varieties of oats have a high nutritional value because of their high protein and oil content while the dietary fiber helps to keep the heart healthy and improves cholesterol levels. The project confirms the importance of oats in the diet and affirms the views of Lady Llanover made a century earlier.

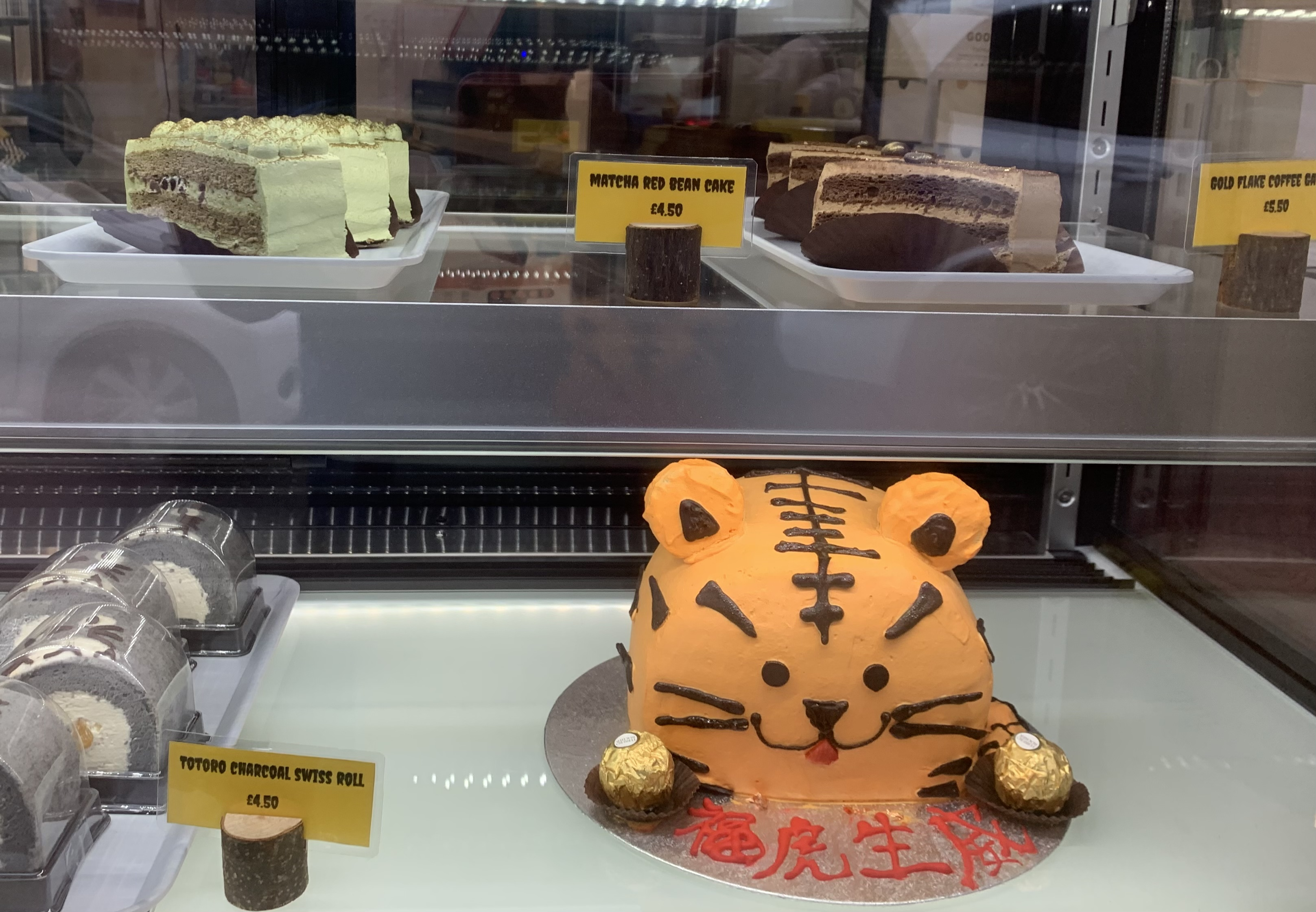
Chinese cakes for sale at a shop near St Helen's Road, Swansea, one in the form of a tiger.

== Milk products ==
Cheese (caws), butter (menyn), and milk (llaeth) are produced in Carmarthenshire and Pembrokeshire which are the main dairy areas within the city of Swansea's sphere of influence. There are no cheeses identified with Swansea and the only cheese named after a Welsh town is Caerphilly cheese. Mason notes that cheesemaking "ceased to be a Welsh concern for part of the 20th century". The demise in cheese making during this period meant that even Caerphilly cheese was produced elsewhere, with the main production having moved to Somerset, which is a production centre for cheddar cheese. However, there has been a revival in Welsh cheese-making. Mason notes that "a number of new-wave cheese-makers work further west, especially in the Pembrokeshire area". Some of these cheeses are sold in Swansea Market, and in Swansea's food shops and street markets.

Welsh rarebit is a typical Welsh dish of cheese on toast and it can be found on the menus of Swansea restaurants, particularly those sourcing food locally. It is sometimes offered as a canapé or is accompanied by bacon, laverbread or mushrooms as a main course. The full range of this dish, which is popular worldwide, can be found at the International Welsh Rarebit Centre which is in an old Victorian school 34 miles from Swansea at Defynnog where Welsh Rarebit has become "something of an art form".

In relation to butter, Mason comments:

Butter has long been an important dairy industry in Wales; both Welsh butter and Welsh bacon are noted for being very salty.

Salted butter reflects a Welsh preference in taste because it complements Welsh cuisine. Welsh butter brands include Sir Gâr, which is a salted butter from Carmarthenshire and is available at outlets in Swansea. Butter is also sold loose from local farm producers in Swansea Market.

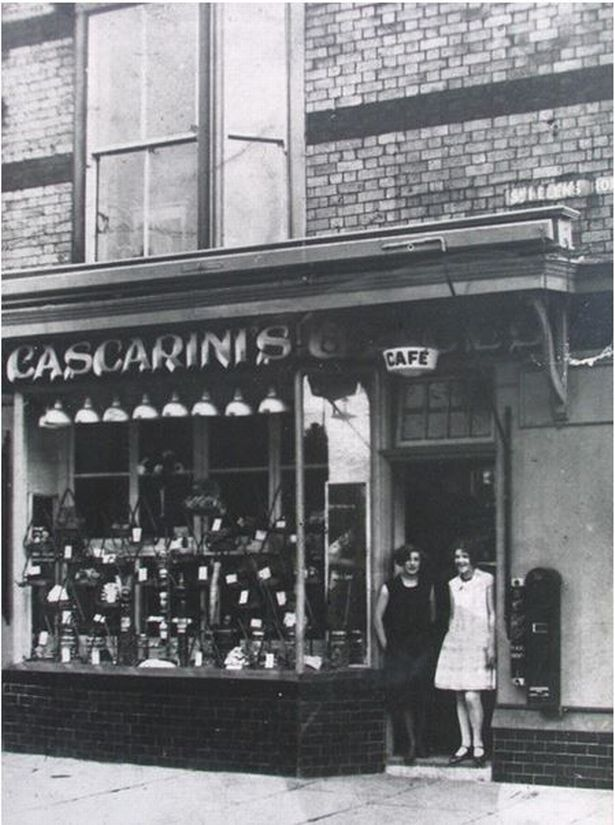
Cascarini's ice cream parlour, Swansea

Ice cream is produced by Italian families that came to Swansea in the twentieth century and established cafes in the city and notable producers include Joe's Ice Cream, produced by the descendants of Luigi Cascarini.

== Fruit and vegetables ==
In 1929, when he was 14 years old, Dylan Thomas published one of his earliest poems, called "A Ballad of Salad", in the Swansea Grammar School (now Bishop Gore School) magazine. The following verses show his acute observation of vegetables, which he probably encountered in the market and stalls of Swansea:

Give me the lettuce that has cooled
Its heart in the rich earth,
Till every joyous leaf is schooled
To crisply crinckled mirth;

Give me mustard and the cress,
Whose glistening stalklets stand
As silver white as nymphs by night
Upon the coral strand;

The winking radish round and red,
That like a ruby shines;
And the first-blessing, onion shed
Wher’er your lowness dines;

The wayward tomato's glorious bead,
Cool cucumber sliced small;
And let the imperial beetroot spread
Her crimson over all.

Dylan Thomas does not mention the leek, which is a vegetable strongly associated with Welsh history, and has recently received PGI status. However, Cerys Matthews provides a recap of its importance in her cookbook as follows:

There's a story dating from the 1600s that St David ordered his soldiers to wear a leek on their helmets in a battle against Saxon invaders. (The battle is also said to have taken place in a field full of leeks). The Welsh association with this vegetable goes back even further in time, to when the people and their druids worshipped trees, plants and other aspects of the natural world. The leek was used as a cure for a cold, a pain reliever in childbirth, and a protector against wounds in battle, lightning strikes and evil spirits. It was also thought to have supernatural powers: if a maiden put a leek under her pillow at night she'd see the face of her future husband."

However, the vegetable is something of an enigma because apart from its use in cawl, there are few historical leek-based recipes. Matthews has a recipe for Leek and Potato Soup, and a recipe for cawl, but Mason comments:

Leeks, which are one of the national symbols of the country, are used in cookery but attempts to make them into often very good dishes in their own right seem slightly self-conscious, rather than rooted in firm tradition.

This viewpoint may overlook the new wave of cuisine which is developing in Wales and uses traditional ingredients in innovative ways.

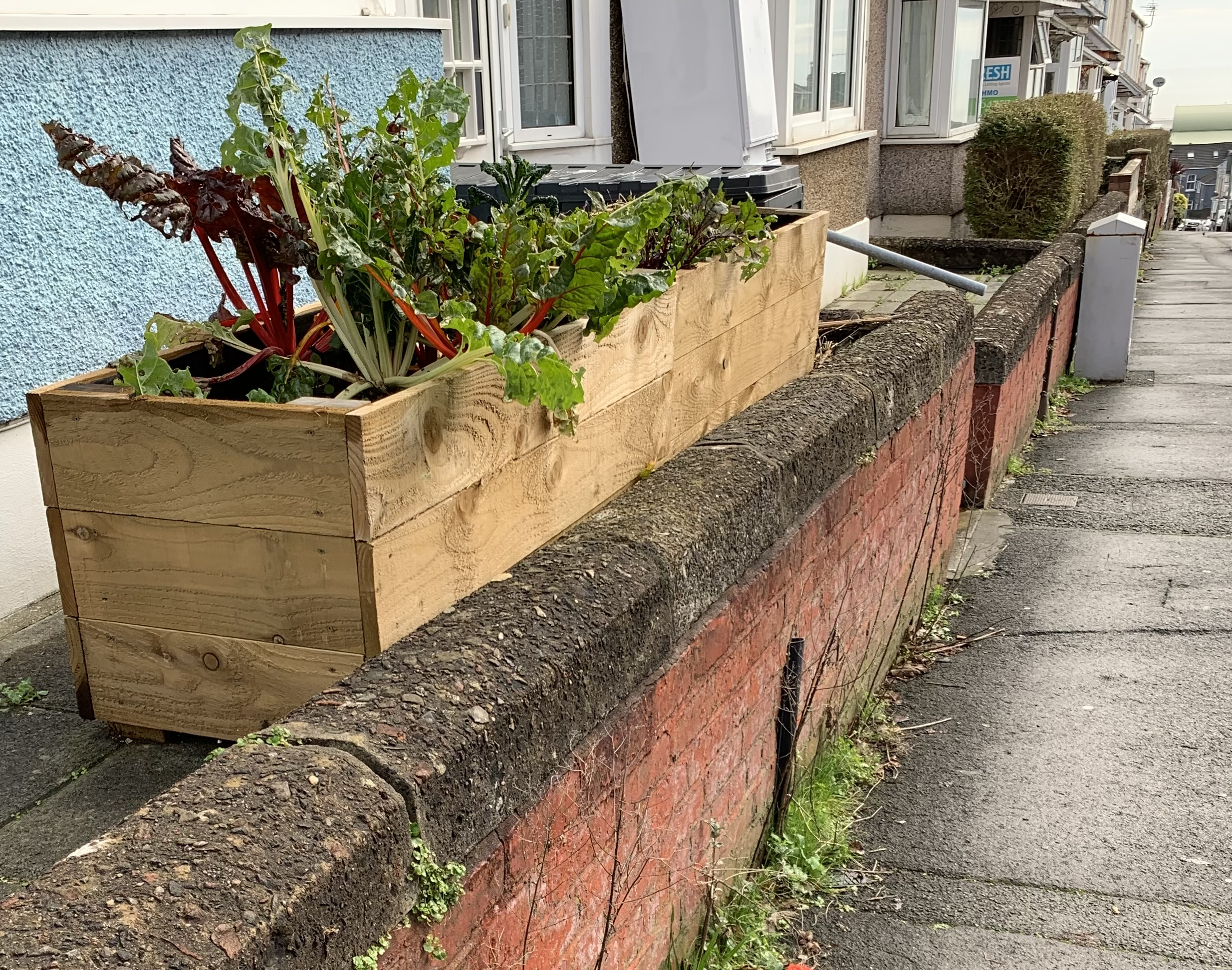
A vegetable grow box in the front garden of a terraced house in Brynmill, Swansea

Watercress was once grown in beds near Llanrhidian, the watercress beds were fed by the small streams running off Gower's northern slopes, but the beds appear to have fallen into disuse as this vegetable is no longer sold in Swansea Market. Watercress would have been a useful source of Vitamin C for people working at sea during the 19th century and who had a very bad diet on board ship. During this period Swansea was home to the Cape Horners, they were seafarers who sailed ships around Cape Horn to Chile and back to supply the demand in Swansea for ore to make copper with.

Swansea's ships and sailors became famous; the voyage to Chile and back could take a year or more and to be called a Cape Horner was "the highest accolade a seaman could earn." During the voyage, the food was made up of salted meat, hardtack, dried beans, potatoes, onions, and some fish. Foods were given nicknames, such as "Harriet Lane" which was a beef and bean hash which reminded sailors of the chopped-up body a murdered English woman of the same name, while rice and raisins was called "Strike me Blind". Hardtack often contained maggots or weevils and there was little, if any, fresh food available during these long voyages; sailors were aware of the importance of fruit and vegetables in their diet.

Another vegetable that can be found in Swansea Market is samphire which is a good accompaniment to fish dishes. In making a hedgerow salad, Cerys Matthews uses watercress, sorrel, dandelion, and lime and recalls using wild hazelnuts:

I use hazelnuts as I recently bought some and they tasted so good, reminding me of cracking them open with my teeth in Swansea woods, which, like opening a beer bottle with my teeth. I don't think I'd try these days.

It was Wynford Vaughan-Thomas who said that Swansea, his hometown, had as many layers as an onion and that each could reduce one to tears. The comparison echoes Dylan Thomas, who called Swansea "an ugly lovely town". According to the geographer W. G. V. Balchin the comment made by Vaughan-Thomas alludes to the "tenfold personality" of the city, which is:

An ancient borough, a seaside resort, a market centre, a pioneer in the manipulation of coal, copper, lead, iron, steel, tinplate and oil, a great port of some antiquity, and a town too with a Devonian and a Caledonian layer.

The multifaceted nature of the city is described by Balchin as follows:

Not only was Swansea an emergent industrial and seaside town; it was also the cultural and intellectual centre of Wales. It possessed a famous Royal Institution for the Arts and Sciences (now called Swansea Museum), a notable theatre and assembly rooms, and it published the first weekly and first daily paper to appear in Wales. Its citizens were far sighted enough to zone the town for industry, residence and commerce. This is why today we find no major industrial development in Swansea west of the line of the High Street. All this was achieved while Cardiff remained virtually unknown.

It is the role of Swansea as a flourishing trading port and market centre that led to its distinctive cuisine, based on the strategic and commercial activities of its citizens which led to it being a significant settlement. According to Balchin:

At its maximum Swansea's urban sphere of influence extends westwards into Pembrokeshire and northwards to Aberystwyth and Brecon, while in the east it competes vigorously in the Vale of Glamorgan with the urban sphere of influence of Cardiff. Within a distance of twenty to thirty miles from the city centre, moreover, the influence of Swansea usually reigns supreme and it is this area which constitutes the Swansea Region.

Consequently, the city draws into its sphere the produce of the region, particularly from the west, with Gower and Carmarthenshire being important suppliers of produce, and this is reflected in produce on sale in the market and shops that sell local produce. These foods find their way into the diverse culinary products of the city.

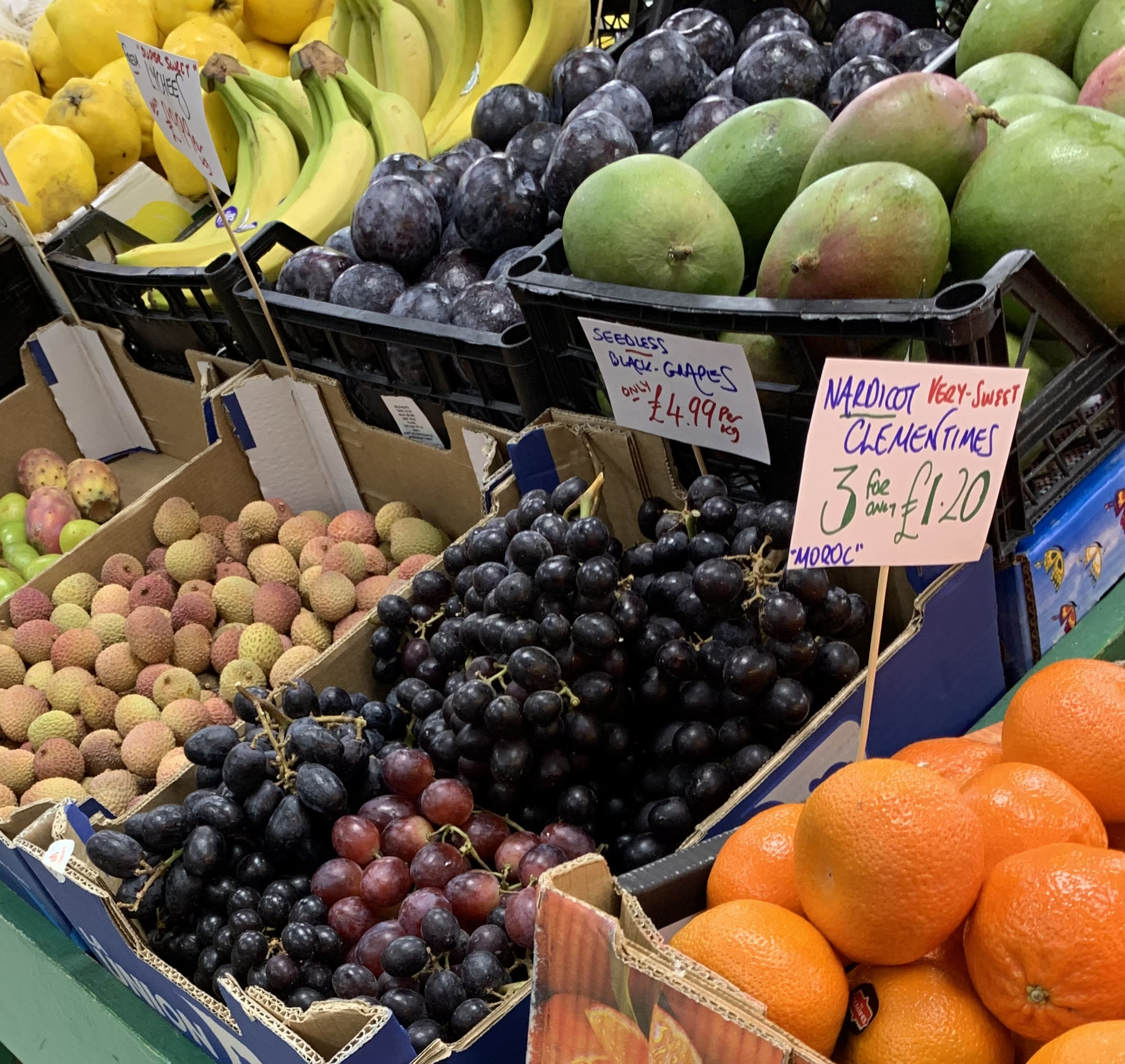
Exotic fruit for sale at an Asian supermarket on St Helen's Road, Swansea

Henderson notes that in the Swansea Region there are three main types of land use that dictate the food that is produced. Using the classification of the Ministry of Agriculture, Fisheries and Food (United Kingdom) of 1968 he notes that the only area of Grade I agricultural land lies on the Carboniferous Limestone plateau of south Gower. Grade II land includes Gower, the western Vale of Glamorgan, and a small area near Llangennech on the west bank of the River Loughor. He notes that this better land all lies below 100 metres and is the main area for arable farming for cash crops. The areas of north Gower and Carmarthenshire have Grade III land, although above 120m the land is Grade IV and can only support permanent grass. In the uplands of Glamorgan, the land is Grade V and can only be used for rough grazing.

Henderson notes that the well-drained soils of south Gower provide Swansea with barley and wheat with coastal areas providing early potatoes. The quality of the land here means that cropping farms are dominant. However, the parish of Bishopston, with its proximity to Swansea, and its fragmented farms and small fields, reflecting a relic open-field system, supplies the city with vegetables and horticultural produce However, closer to the city, dairy farming dominates the peri-urban region of Swansea, and this becomes more pronounced towards the west side of the city because Carmarthenshire is the chief supplier of dairy products to the Swansea Region. Carmarthenshire has been described by Henderson as: “effectively having a dairying monoculture, in which other agricultural enterprises are completely subordinate." To the north of Swansea there is access to common land and mountain grazing with sheep rearing being a ‘characteristic enterprise’.

== Fairs ==
In 1306, there is a record of fairs on The Feast of the Assumption of Mary (15 August), and St. Martin's Day (11 November). In 1563 fairs are recorded on St Elizabeth's Day (5 November), Lady Day (25 March) and Michaelmas. The 1655 Charter provided for four fairs to be held every year, on 8 May, 2 July, 15 August, and 8 October. Each fair could last two days and if the days fell on a Sunday the fair would be held on the following Monday. By 1781, the burgesses of Swansea advertised in the Hereford, Gloucester and Bristol newspapers and printed hand bills in English and Welsh, to publicize a fair held on 14 September. The fairs were held in the marketplace of Swansea Castle, and they helped the trade of the town and provided income. By 1851, fairs were being held on the second Saturday of May, 2 July, 15 August and on 8 or 29 October.

When the market at Swansea Castle was replaced by the market in Oxford Street, the traditional fairs continued as livestock fairs which were probably held at Danygraig, Port Tennant or at Greenhill or the Burrows. The Greenhill fair was held on the High Street at the location of a public house called the Full Moon. The Burrows fair was held on Tuesday and Wednesday of Easter week. It had temporary stalls selling cakes, gingerbread, fruits, lollipops, confectionery, and other goods. There were also fairground games. This fair was said to have been held since time immemorial. The sale of beers and spirits and the less regulated locations for these fairs away from the town centre led to them often being rowdy affairs and they were eventually abolished.

However, the importance of fairs and markets as a way of regenerating local economies has been recognised by the Welsh Government and local councils now support fairs across Wales. In Swansea local markets now take place in Mumbles, Uplands and Swansea Marina and they sell locally sourced products. Mason notes:

Since the late 1990s encouraging local food production has received much attention. The aims include reducing food miles, raising awareness of local food production, and reconnecting farmers and consumers. Networks of farmers markets have proved enormously popular, bringing produce directly to the public.

In Swansea, the recognition of the importance of locally sourced food has reflected this trend.

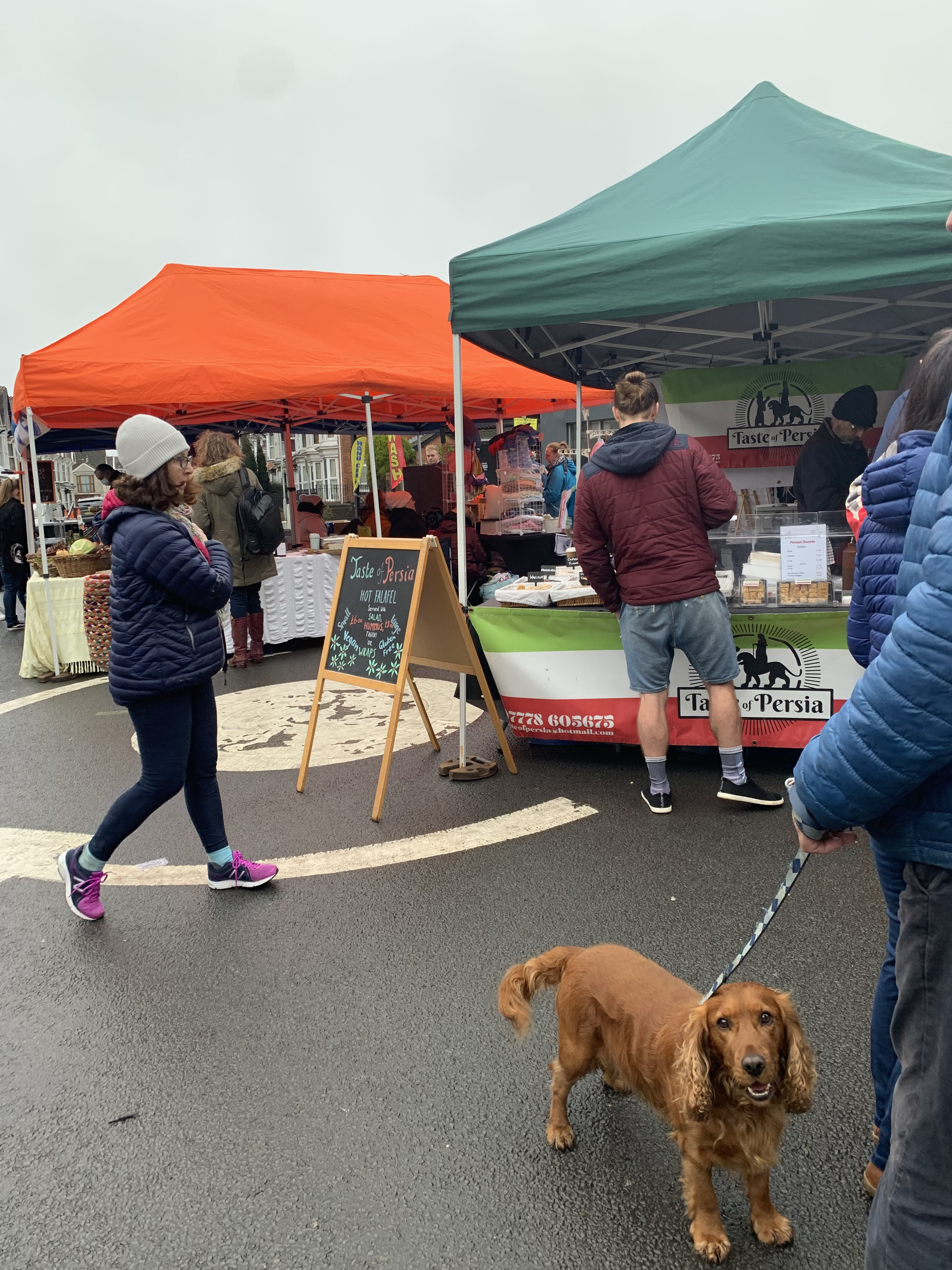
Uplands market

== Drinks ==
Mumbles became a popular drinking place after the Sunday Closing (Wales) Act 1881 which allowed people refreshment if they covered a distance of at least three miles and were on necessary business. This led to pubs on the edge of towns becoming very popular on Sundays. Day trips were also popular. In the diary of Francis Kilvert there is an entry from October 1878 as follows:

All six of us, Mr. and Mrs. Westhorp, Ilston, Hettie, sweet Annie Mitchell and myself drove in the waggonette with Tattersal of Oystermouth and went down to Langland Bay, where we had luncheon among the rocks, the ladies drinking wine out of shells as the cup had been forgotten. Ilston and I took off our shoes and socks and paddled in the sea. The water was grey, cold and nasty. Then the dear girls helped me to gather some of the beautiful seaweeds among the rocks.

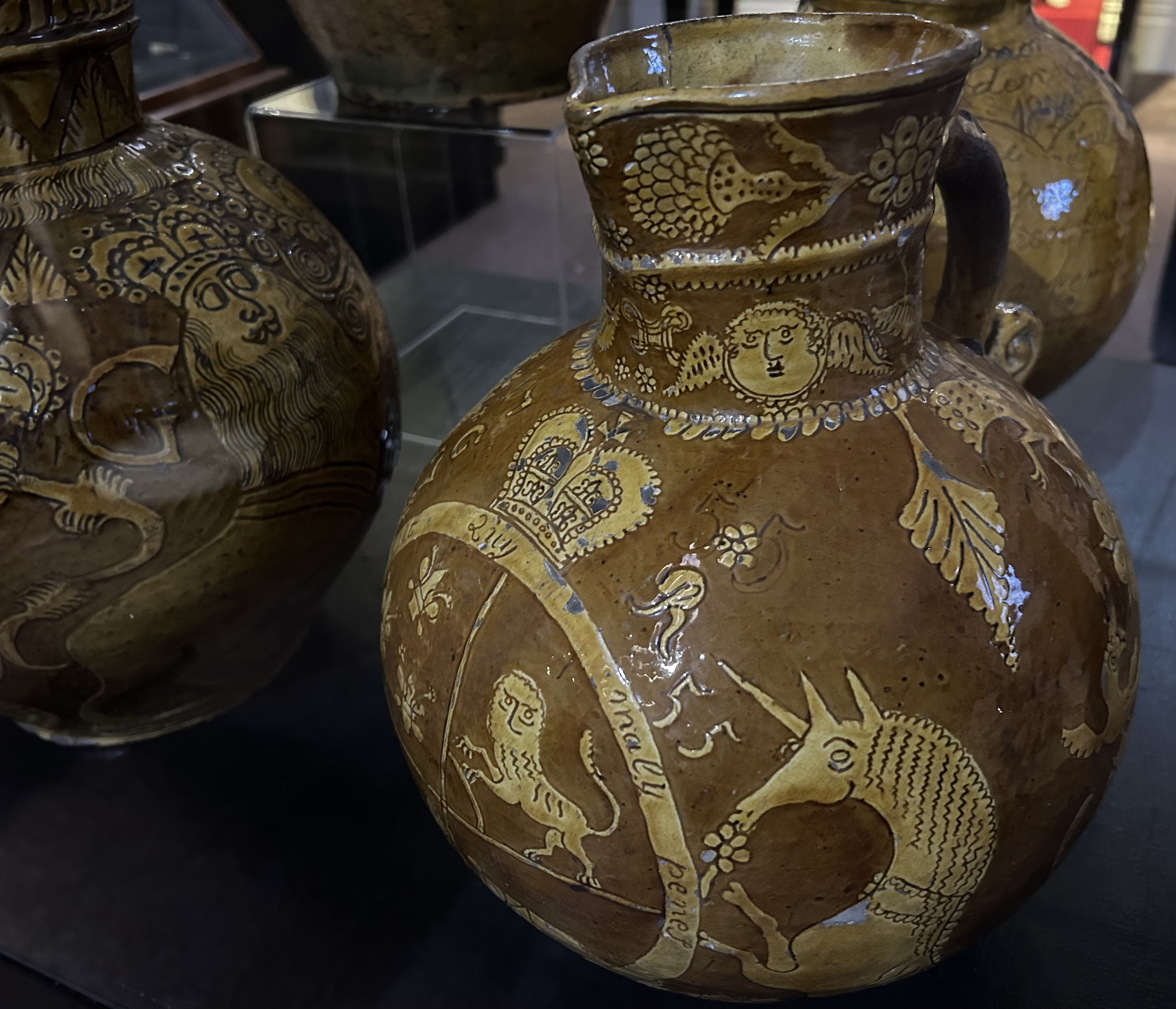
Harvest jugs exhibited in Swansea Museum. From about 1650 ships from north Devon would sail to Swansea with these jugs as ballast. They were made in Barnstaple and Bideford and would be sold at Swansea where the ships would reload with coal for delivery to ports along the Bristol Channel. The jugs were used to serve drinks to agricultural workers at a harvest supper which was held at the end of the harvest to celebrate the bringing in of the crops. The jugs would often be decorated with verse and the name of the owner.

In Wales, large-scale brewing began in the 19th century and grew up near the ironworks and coal mines which provided a ready market for beer consumption. In Swansea, the first large-scale brewery of the 18th century followed the development of copper smelting in the Lower Swansea valley. In 1792, the Swansea Corporation granted a site next to the River Tawe to Phillips & Kendall and they built the Cambrian Porter Brewery on the Strand near Swansea Docks. By 1799 a second brewery had been established nearby. As land became more valuable in the centre of Swansea, the breweries moved further out, to the Mysydd Fields which was an area noted for its springs. Here, the Swansea Brewery was established and is recorded as being in existence in Pigot's Directory of 1835. By 1858 it was known as Swansea Old Brewery. In 1893 this brewery was said to hold "a position of distinction" in the breweries of South Wales. The water for the brewery was drawn from the Singleton Well which was said to be famous for its "depth and the purity and sweetness of its water". The popularity of the Singleton Ale produced by Swansea Old Brewery was reported as follows:

This ale was the local Burton ale, and was sold to all the publicans around the country...The present company find no diminution in the popularity of Singleton Ale, inasmuch as a large number of householders and publicans give it the preference over the Burton ales

Swansea Old Brewery won a prize medal and a diploma at the London Exhibition in 1888. During this time, the most popular drink in Swansea was mild ale. Swansea Old Brewery sold three types of mild ale: a Crystal Bitter, two types of India Pale Ale, a light bitter and three types of stout. One stout was called the Invalid Stout and was said to be known for its "strengthening and nourishing properties". In 1896 the brewery had 50 pubs and a brewery at Singleton Street and it had 42 pubs in 1927, when it was taken over by Hancocks (now known as Brains Brewery). Hancocks was then the biggest brewer in Wales and, in 1937, in a review of their history, they wrote that the acquisition of Swansea Old Brewery was a milestone in their development. Hancocks subsequently opened their own brewery in Swansea, called West End Brewery which was located in Western Street and they sold the brewery at Singleton Street which became a bus station for United Welsh Services; the brewery clock was re-housed at Bishopston Church.

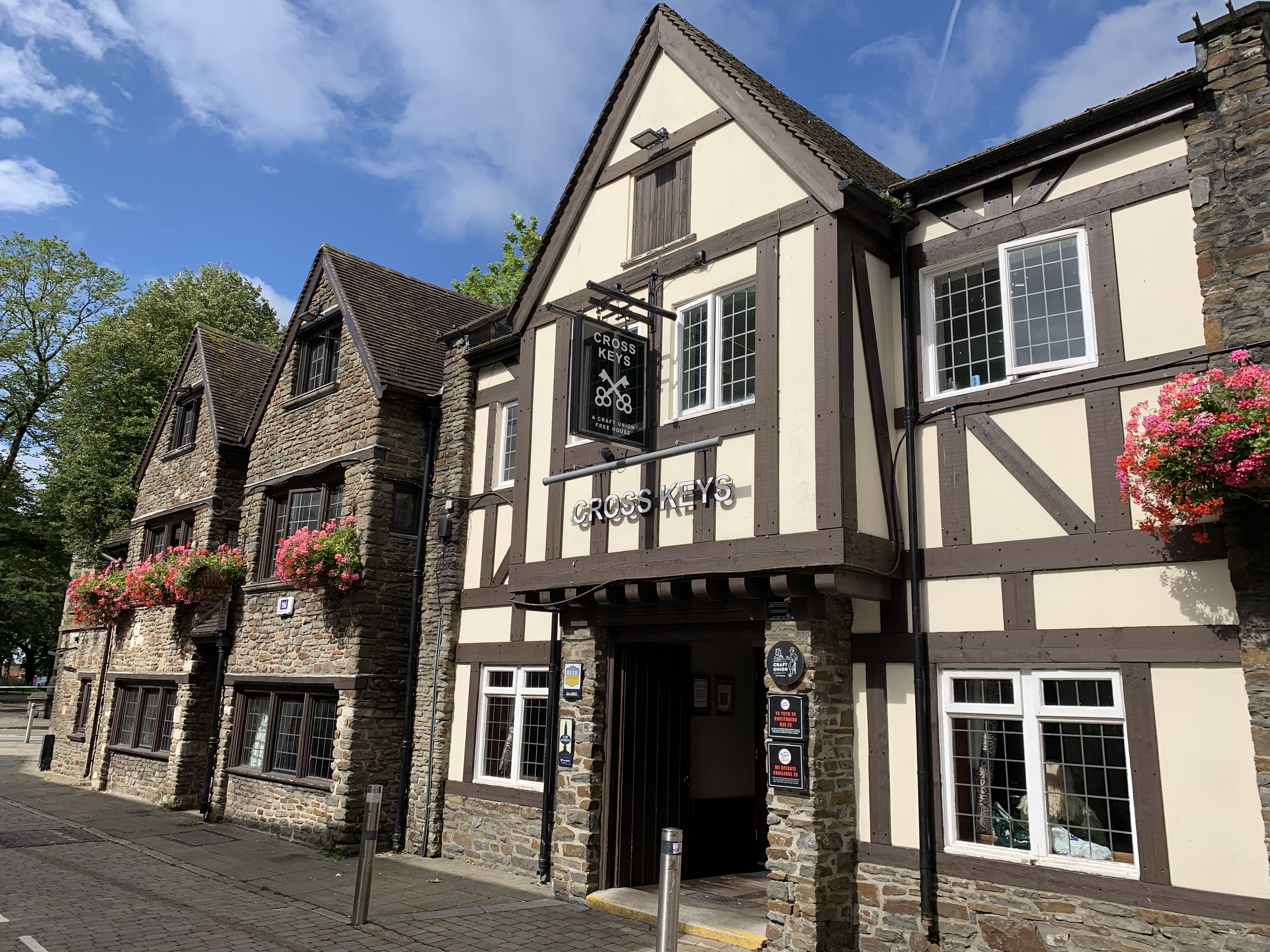
The Cross Keys Inn, Swansea, is a large pub with a garden and is built on the foundations of a thirteenth century hospice, it is said to be the oldest pub in Swansea

Swansea United Brewery was established in 1890 from the amalgamation of Orange Street and Glamorgan Breweries and had 58 tied houses. It was taken over by Truman's in 1926 and was closed. This was the first major takeover of a Welsh brewery by a leading English brewery and led to Hancock's acquisition of Swansea Old Brewery to protect their position. Hancock's had previously taken over the Swansea wine and spirit merchant called James Hall in 1889 as part of their growth to become the largest brewer and wine and spirit merchant in Wales and it became the official supplier to Swansea Guildhall. Hancock's closed their West End Brewery in 1969 and this ended large scale brewing in the city.

Some pubs have become notable because of their association with Dylan Thomas. In his book "Dylan Thomas: The Pubs", Jeff Towns writes about the following pubs: The Uplands Hotel, The Bay View, The Three Lamps, The No Sign Wine Bar, The No. 10, The Queens, and The Bush Inn. Each of these pubs is referred to in the writings of Dylan Thomas although some of them no longer exist as pubs. John Ackerman, a biographer of Dylan Thomas notes how the local pubs contributed to the writer's artistic imagination:

During the thirties Dylan Thomas was becoming a connoisseur of pub life, both in Swansea, Laugharne and London....and no doubt collecting those anecdotes and snippets of heard and overheard conversation that were to salt his prose comedy.

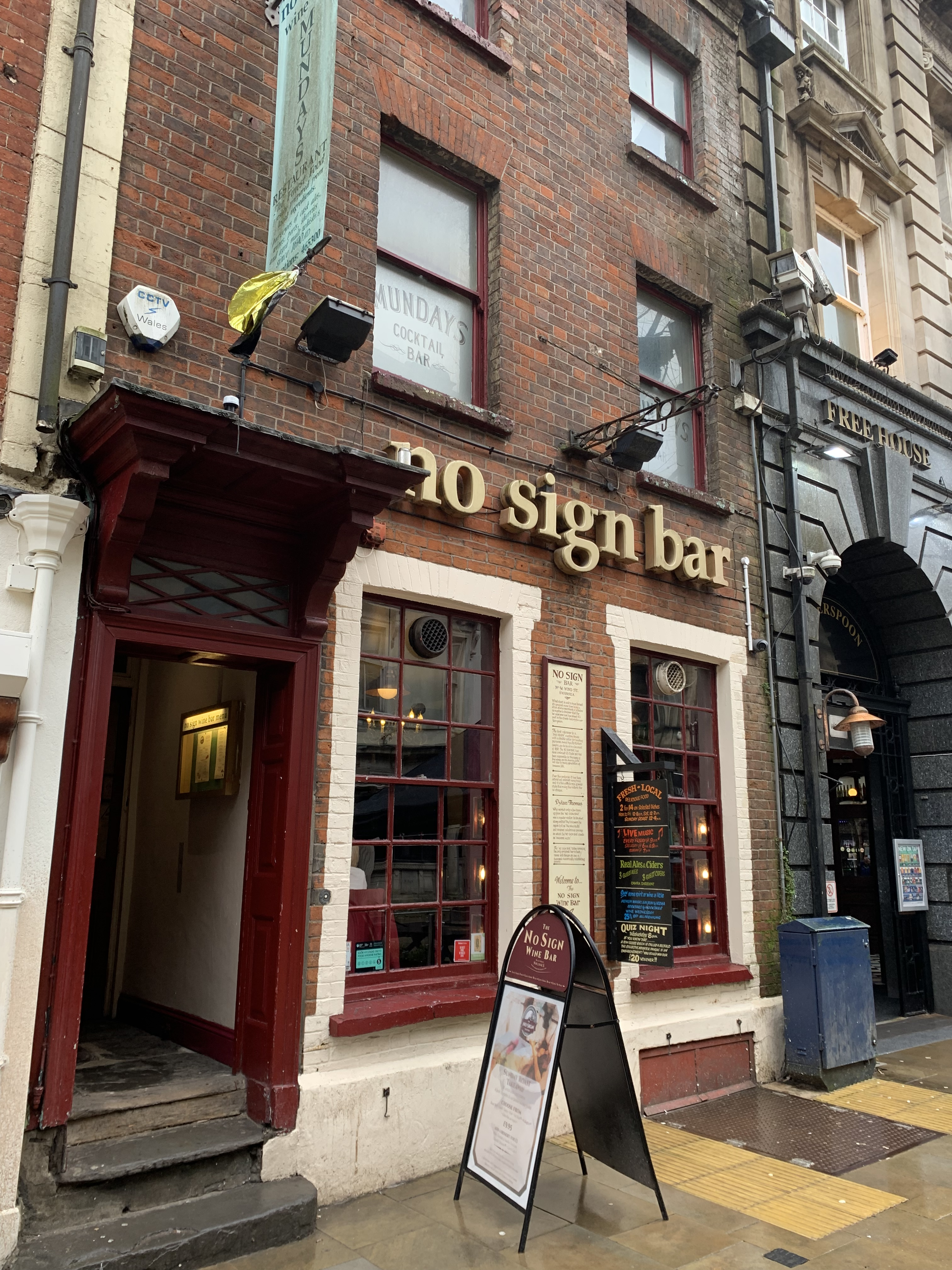
No Sign Bar, Wind Street, Swansea, it has been described by Jeff Towns as "a famous but easy-to-miss establishment...a rare independent bar surrounded by tasteless, giant themed chain pubs".

Writing about having a beer at the Three Lamps, Thomas observes:

I liked the taste of beer, its live white lather, its brass bright depths, the sudden world through the wet brown walls of the glass, the tilted rush to the lips and the slow swallowing down to the lapping belly, the salt on the tongue, the foam at the corners.

The Three Lamps was a bar not far from the Daily Post offices where Thomas was a trainee journalist, and it was a favourite with Swansea's professional people. In reflecting on his coming of age, Thomas wrote:

I leant against the bar, between an alderman and a solicitor, drinking bitter, wishing that my father could see me now...He could not fail to see that I was a boy no longer, nor fail to be angry at the angle of my fag and my hat and the threat of the clutched tankard.

Breweries associated with Swansea today include Boss Brewing, Mumbles Brewery, Swansea Brewery, and Tomos Watkin (see Beer in Wales). Hurns Brewing Company is a drinks company based in Swansea which produces soft drinks including soda water, ginger beer, lemonade and cordials. Penderyn distillery is a Welsh whiskey distillery producing whisky at its main site in Penderyn and which established a site at Hafod Copperworks in 2023. Au Vodka is a vodka which was originally produced in Swansea.

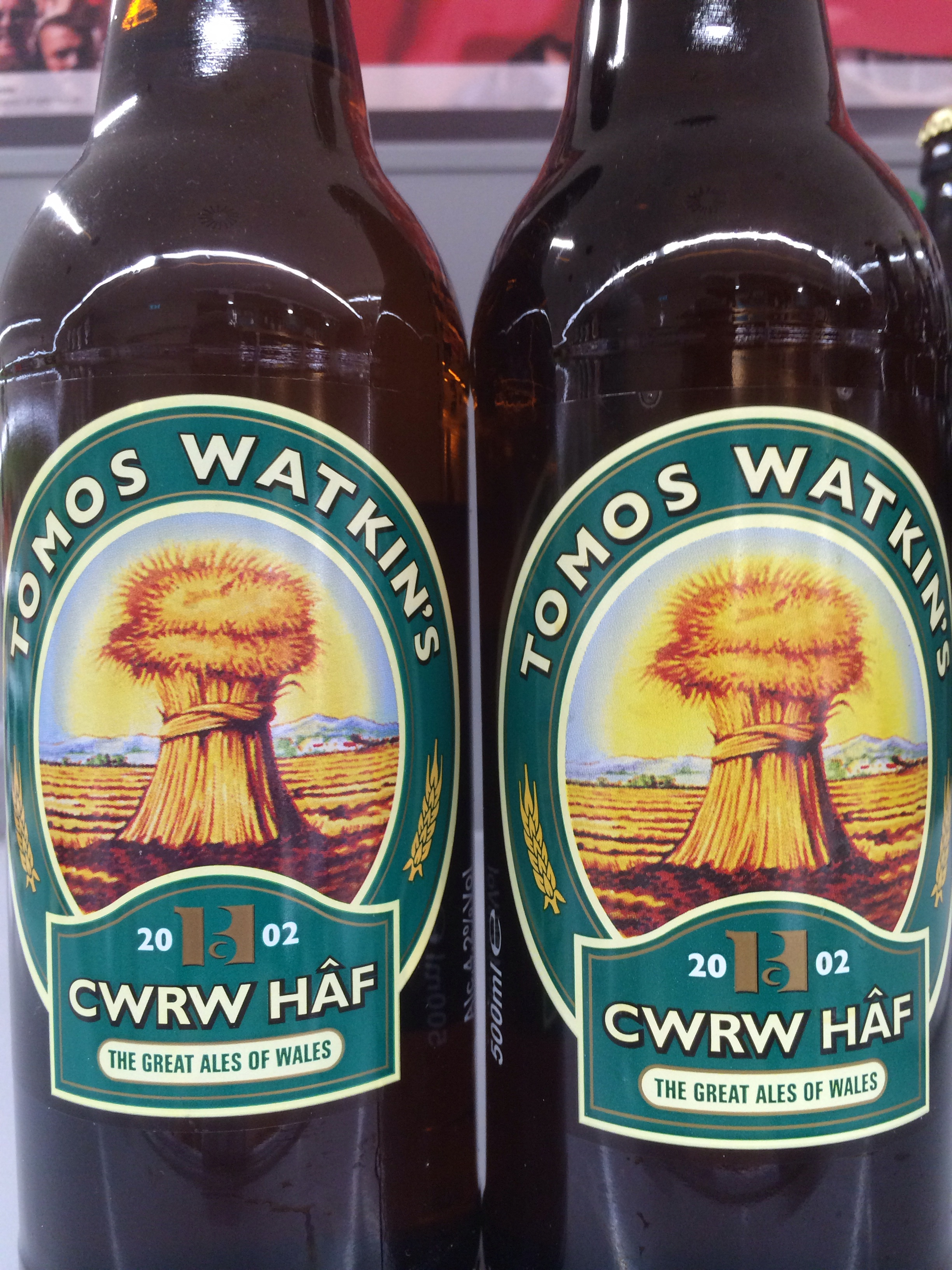
Bottles of Cwrw Haf (English: Summer Ale) produced by Tomos Watkin's brewery

== Restaurants and cafes ==
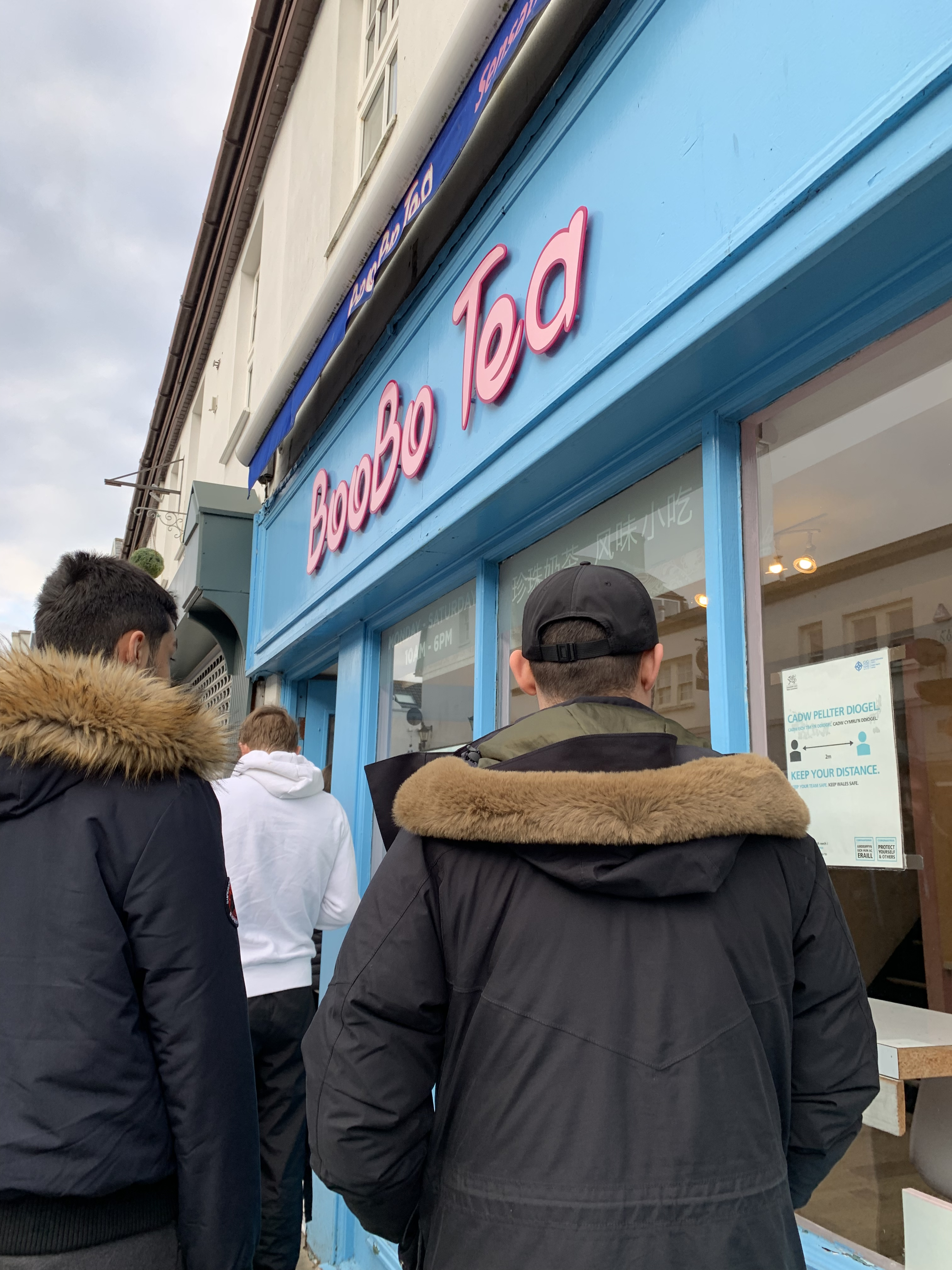
A Boobo Tea shop in Plymouth Street, Swansea, selling Bubble tea and popular with students studying at Swansea University

There are cafes and restaurants in Swansea that serve many different types of cuisine. Areas with a concentration of restaurants include the Uplands, Mumbles, Swansea City Centre, including Wind Street and St Helen's Road. Many of Swansea's parks have cafes, which are open during the daytime. The Kardomah Cafe in Swansea is associated with The Kardomah Gang, a group of artists active during the mid-20th century. The café retains its original decor.

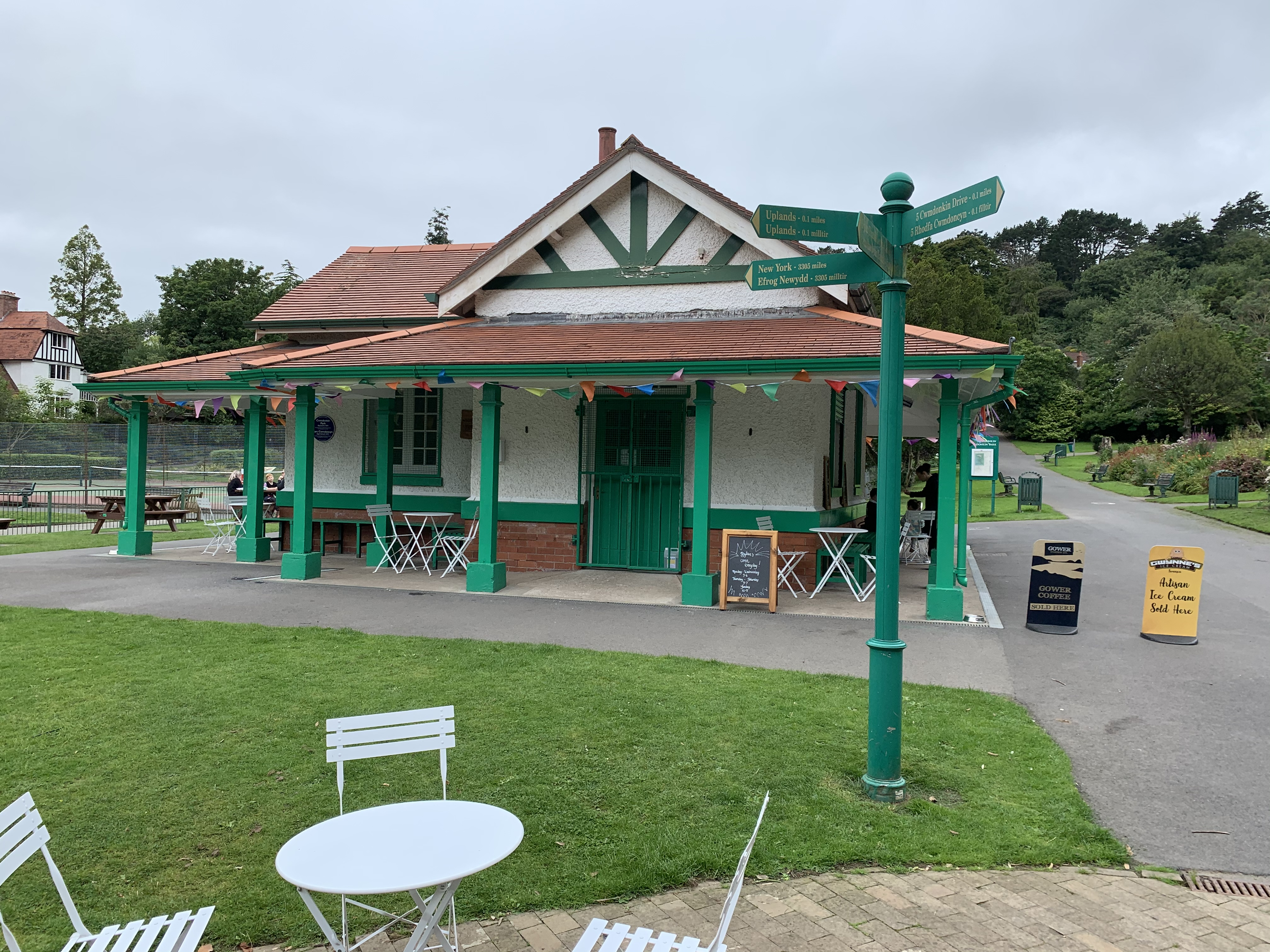
Tea room and shop, Cwmdonkin Park, Uplands, Swansea; this park was a favourite of Dylan Thomas

Indian cuisine, Bengali cuisine and Bangladeshi cuisine is served at restaurants located along St Helen's Road, which developed into a restaurant hub from the 1970s onwards. This has led to the opening of international supermarkets which serve the restaurant trade and the Indian, African, and Chinese communities.

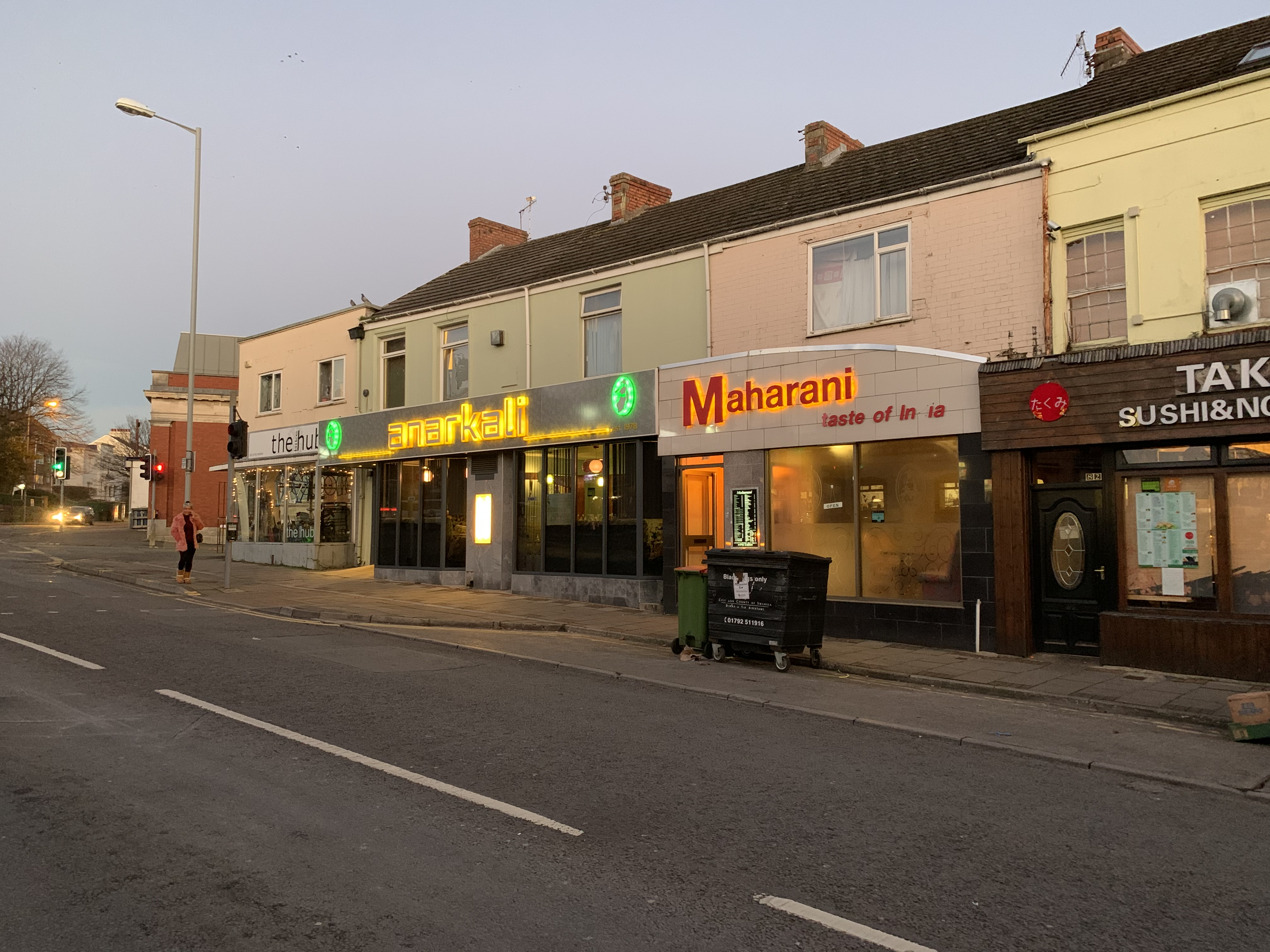
Restaurants on St Helen's Road, Swansea, in this area there are restaurants serving cuisine from different parts of the world, but mainly from the Indian subcontinent

Indian and Chinese restaurants also provide places to eat for people working late in the evening economy. Bonnie Tyler who sang in Swansea's nightclubs in the 1970s would often arrange to meet her husband Robert Sullivan (judoka) after work and writes in her autobiography:

We’d see each other during the day, and then we would be working in the clubs at night. By the time we finished work, the only restaurants that were still open were either the Indian or the Chinese, so we used to alternate. Then every Tuesday, we would go to the Berni Inn on the high street in Swansea.

I suppose, given how often we were in Indian restaurants, it was quite fitting that Robert got down on one knee and proposed to me in our favourite one, The Kismet, in September 1972.

There are numerous Chinese restaurants in Swansea and the city has had a long association with China due to the work of Griffith John who, in 1885, translated the New Testament into Classical Chinese.

== Places to visit ==
The Dylan Thomas Birthplace is located in a house in the Uplands where Dylan Thomas was born and offers guided tours, afternoon tea, lunch and dinner by appointment. The house was visited by Johnny Depp in July 2023.

Swansea Botanical Gardens is located in Singleton Park. The gardens were opened in 1926 as an educational garden containing a “collection of economic plants and British flora”. It was renamed as the Botanical Gardens in 1991 and contains a glasshouse with examples of exotic commercial plant species, such as coffee and banana. It has a wellbeing garden and a plant shop which is run by the Friends of Swansea Botanical Garden which is a registered charity. Plant sales are used to fund the maintenance of the gardens.

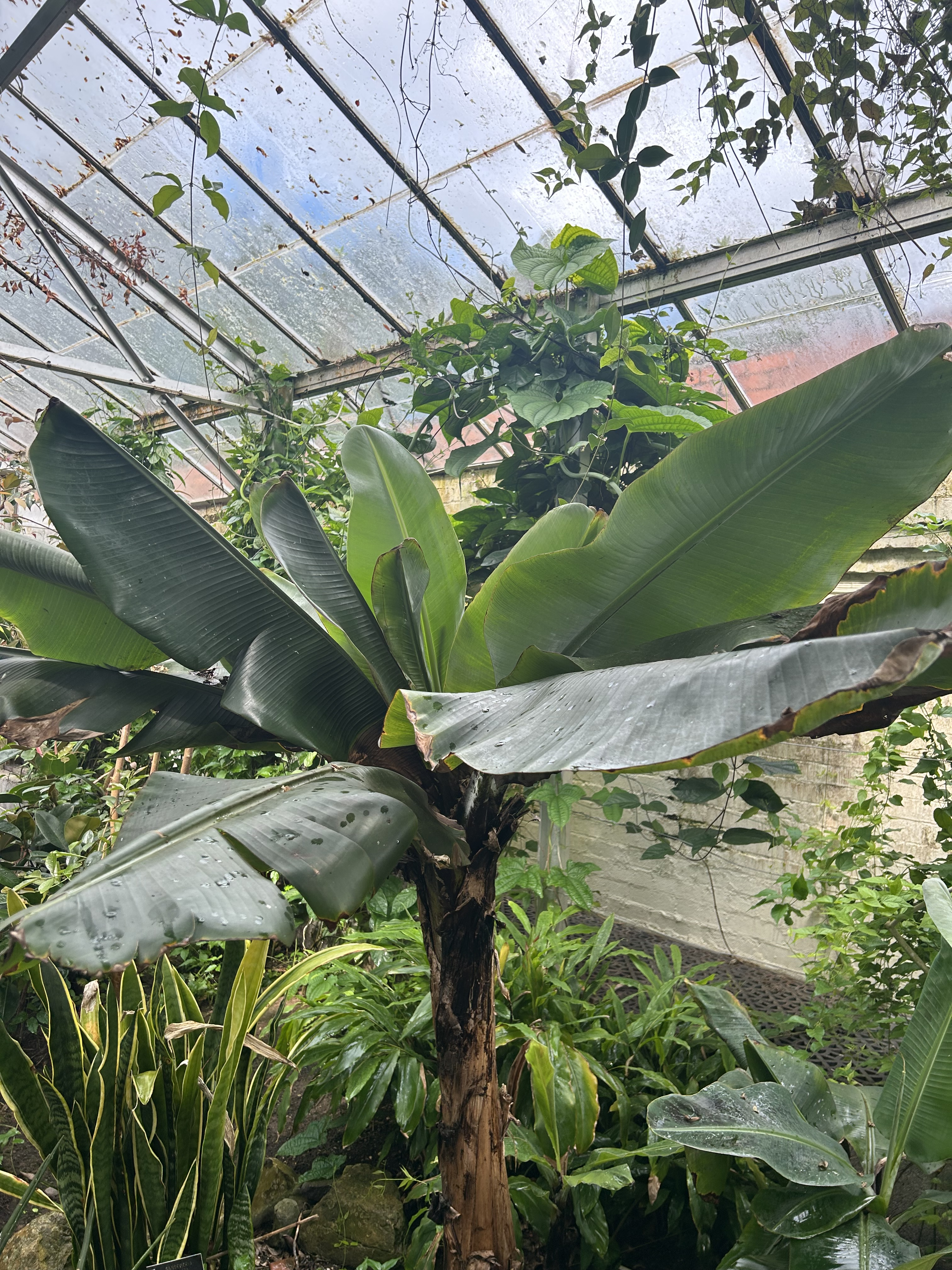
Banana plant in a glasshouse at Swansea Botanical Gardens

Cae Felin is a CSA farm near Morriston Hospital which has a vegetable garden, and orchard. It follows a No-dig gardening system and works with schools, the general public and Morriston Hospital's staff and outpatients. It sells veg boxes and teaches seed planting, harvesting, and cooking.

The Vetch Field is named after the vetch which used to grow in this location before it became the first football ground of Swansea City A.F.C. The football ground has relocated and the site has become a community garden and allotments known as the Vetch Veg Community Garden.

== See also ==
- Welsh cuisine
- Cuisine of Carmarthenshire
- Cuisine of Ceredigion
- Cuisine of Gower
- Cuisine of Pembrokeshire
- Cuisine of the Vale of Glamorgan
