= Luigi Cascarini =

Italian-born entrepreneur

Luigi Cascarini was born in Italy and immigrated to Swansea where he became a local businessman and entrepreneur.

== Early years ==
Cascarini was born in Abruzzo and in 1898 he left Italy intending to travel to America. He worked his way across Europe until he reached Le Havre, where he boarded a coal steamer bound for Swansea

== Arrival in Swansea ==
Cascarini found that in Swansea there were no cafés that provided industrial workers, who were employed in the Swansea Valley and the munitions factory in Bridgend, with food and refreshments on their way to and from work. He decided to open a café that would be open all day offering refreshments for working people.

== Establishment of first café ==
In order to start the business Cascarini took a loan from an Italian friend. With this capital he opened a general food store on the High Street in Swansea. The shop opened at 4am each day and became a success, leading to the opening of another five cafés around Swansea, including cafés at Fabian Way and St Helen’s Road.

In 1922 Cascarini brought his eldest son, Joe, from Abruzzo to Swansea in order to run the café located at St Helen’s Road.

== Ice Cream ==
The shop on the High Street became known, in particular, for its vanilla ice cream, which was made out of milk, corn flour, and sugar.

Under the supervision of Joe Cascarini the St Helen’s Road café became a well known ice cream parlour and Joe developed his own vanilla blend of ice cream.

The St Helen’s Road ice cream parlour is now known as Joe’s Ice Cream. The business is still run by members of the Cascarini family and remains an artisan ice cream producer, although it has opened parlours in Mumbles and Llansamlet as well.

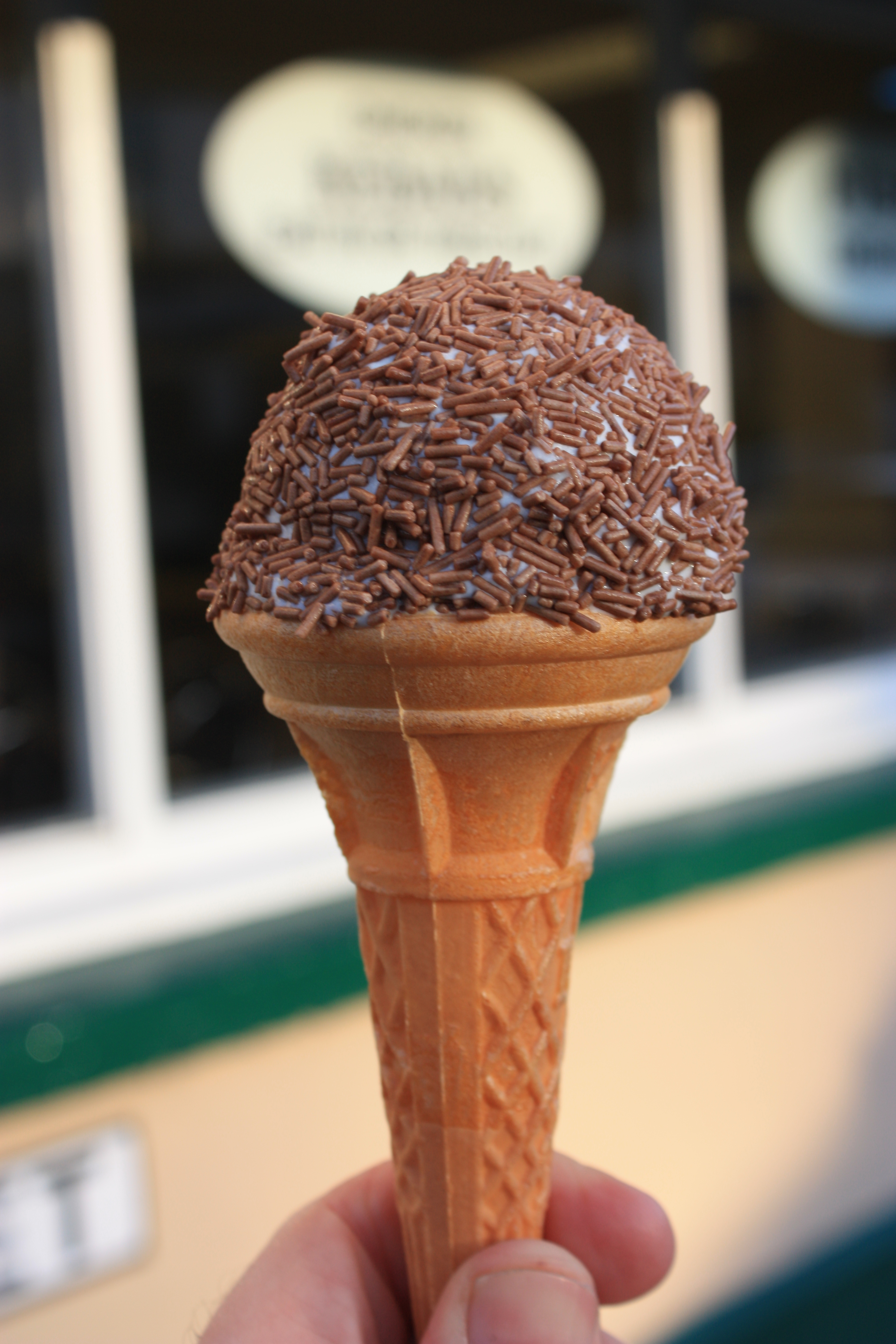
Vanilla ice cream in cornet with chocolate chip sprinkling, from Joe's Ice Cream Parlour, St Helen's Road, Swansea

The other five cafés were run by members of the Cascarini family until they retired from business and the cafés no longer exist, although they are fondly remembered by Swansea people.
