= Penderyn =

Penderyn may refer to:

- Penderyn (whisky), a whisky produced by Penderyn Distillery
- Penderyn, Rhondda Cynon Taf, a village in Wales
  - Penderyn transmitting station, near the village
  - Moel Penderyn, a hill near the village
    - Dyffrynnoedd Nedd a Mellte, a Moel Penderyn, a Site of Special Scientific Interest that includes Moel Penderyn
  - Vaynor and Penderyn High School
- Richard Lewis (1807/8–1831), known as Dic Penderyn, a Welsh man executed for his part in the Merthyr Rising 1831
