= Welsh cake =

Griddle-cooked sweet cake from Wales

Welsh cake Picau ar y maen
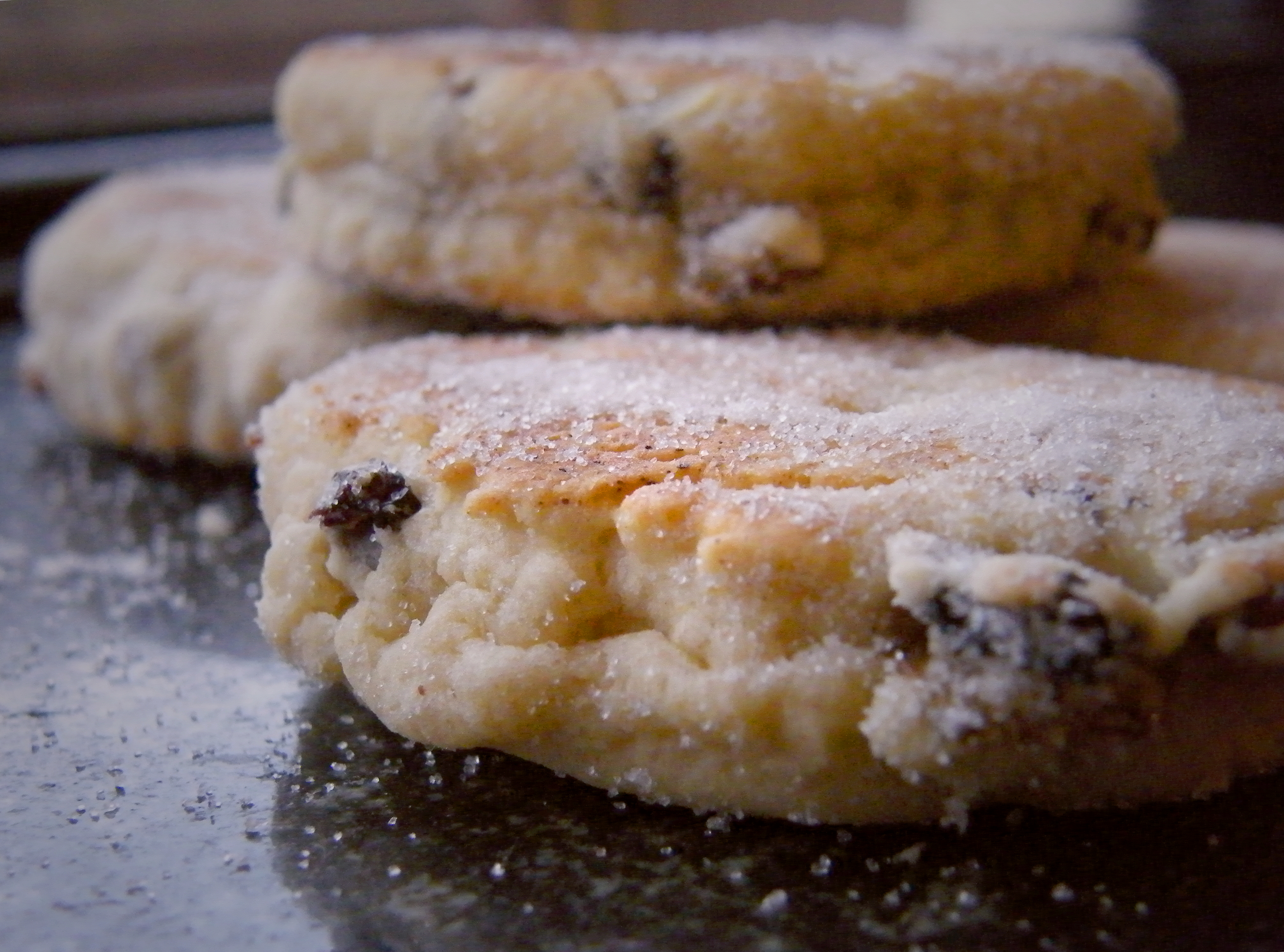
- Home-made Welsh cakes dusted with caster sugar
- Alternative names: Bakestones, griddle cakes, pics
- Course: Afternoon tea, dessert
- Place of origin: Wales
- Serving temperature: Hot or cold
- Main ingredients: Flour, butter, sugar, eggs, currants
- Variations: Jam split, chocolate chip, herb varieties

Welsh cakes (Welsh: picau ar y maen, pice bach, cacennau cri or teisennau gradell), also known as bakestones, griddle cakes, or pics, are a traditional sweet bread from Wales. They are small, round, spiced cakes that are cooked on a griddle or bakestone rather than baked in an oven, giving them a distinctive texture between a biscuit, scone, and pancake.

Welsh cakes have been popular since the late 19th century and emerged from the addition of fat, sugar, and dried fruit to traditional flatbread recipes that were already being cooked on griddles. They became particularly associated with the South Wales coalfield during the height of the Welsh coal mining industry, when they served as portable, nutritious food for miners to take underground. Food historian Carwyn Graves notes in his scholarly analysis that Welsh cakes represent "a heritage both of griddle cakes" that formed part of Wales's distinctive grain culture, positioned at "the intersection of a 'Celtic' oat-based tradition and a northern European wheat/barley/rye tradition."

== History ==
=== Origins and early development ===
The origins of Welsh cakes can be traced to medieval Wales, where flatbreads and oatcakes were commonly cooked on bakestones. These early versions were simple, made primarily from oats, flour, and water, and served as basic sustenance for rural communities. The bakestone itself, known in Welsh as maen (stone) or planc (board), has ancient Celtic origins and similar cooking implements can be found throughout Celtic regions, including the Scottish girdle and Irish griddle.

The transformation from simple flatbread to the Welsh cake known today occurred during the mid-19th century with the increasing availability of ingredients such as butter, lard, sugar, and dried fruit. This period coincided with improved trade routes and the growth of market towns in Wales, making previously expensive ingredients more accessible to ordinary households.

=== Industrial revolution and coal mining ===
Welsh cakes gained particular prominence during the 19th and early 20th centuries when Wales became the world's largest coal-producing nation. The mining industry fundamentally shaped Welsh society, with entire communities dependent on coal extraction. In this context, Welsh cakes served a vital practical purpose as portable, durable food that miners could easily carry underground.

The cakes were ideally suited to the harsh conditions of coal mining. They were small enough to fit in coat pockets, robust enough to withstand the physical demands of mine work, and provided substantial nutrition for workers engaged in physically demanding labour. Mining families developed the practice of wives preparing batches of Welsh cakes for their husbands to take to work, often along with provisions for children's school lunches.

According to oral histories collected by the National Museum of Wales, Welsh cakes became regular features of working-class households throughout Glamorgan and other mining regions by the 1870s. The museum notes that "the miner would also expect to find them in his food-box," highlighting their established role in mining culture.

=== Decline and revival ===
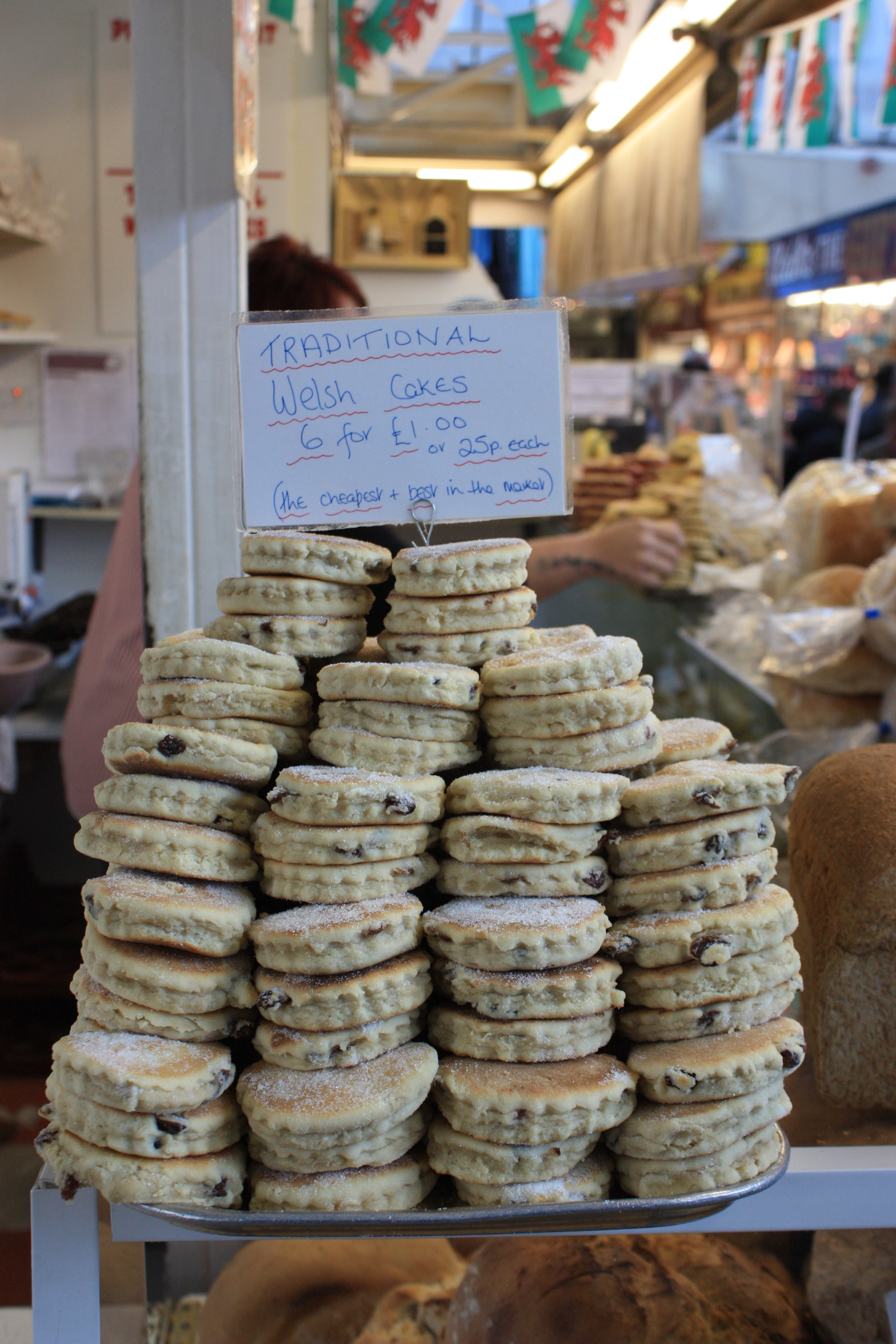
A stack of Welsh Cakes at Swansea Market

The decline of the Welsh coal industry in the mid-20th century reduced the practical necessity for Welsh cakes as miners' food, but they remained embedded in Welsh cultural identity. During this period, Welsh cakes transitioned from everyday sustenance to occasional treats, particularly associated with afternoon tea and special occasions.

The late 20th and early 21st centuries have seen renewed interest in Welsh cakes as part of broader movements toward traditional and artisanal food. They have become prominent symbols of Welsh cuisine, frequently served during Saint David's Day celebrations and featured in Welsh cultural events worldwide.

== Preparation and cooking ==
=== Traditional method ===
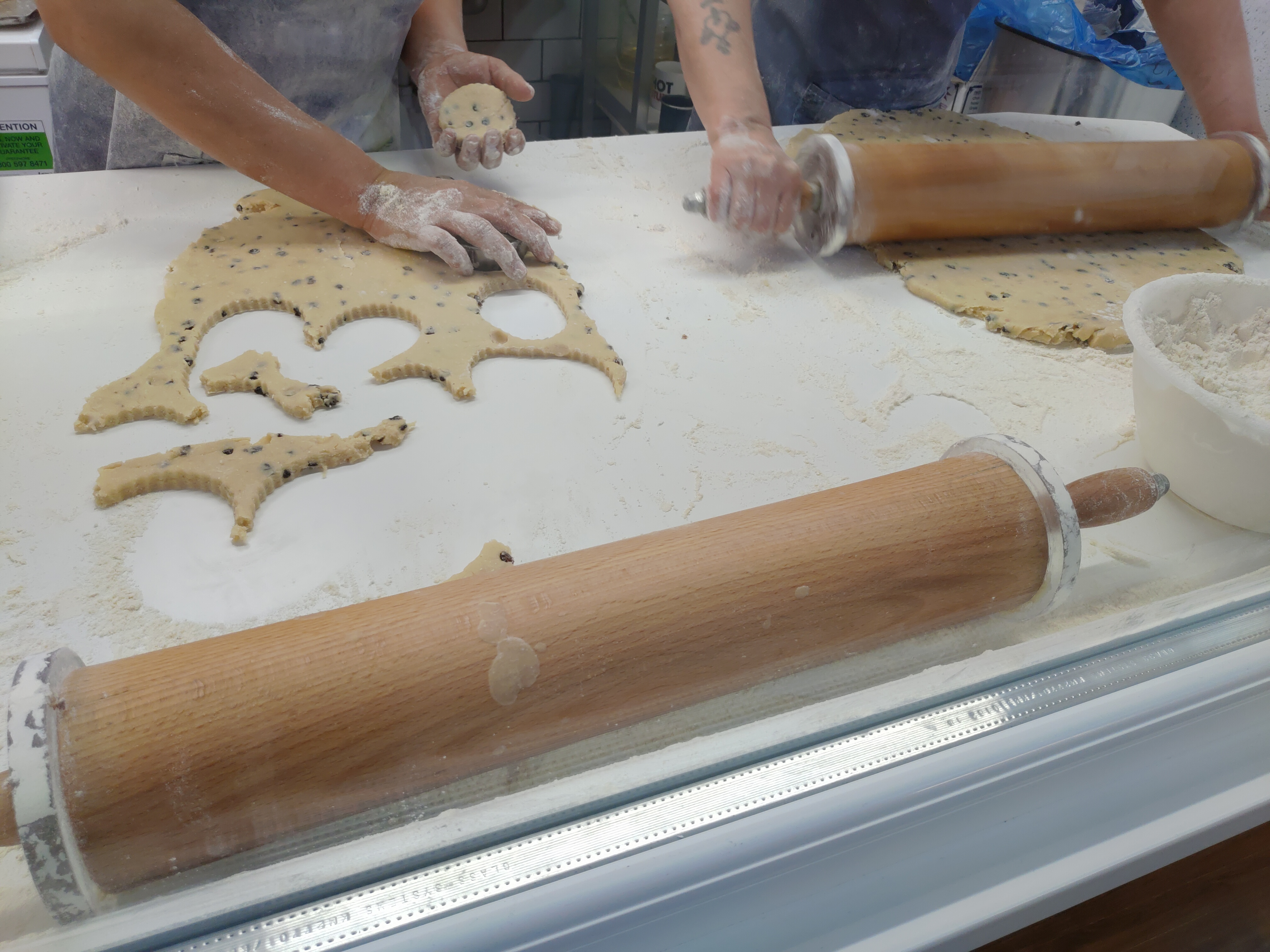
Welsh cakes being punched out, ready for baking

Welsh cakes are traditionally prepared using the rubbing-in method, where cold butter or lard is incorporated into flour until the mixture resembles breadcrumbs. Sugar, dried fruit (typically currants or sultanas), and spices such as nutmeg, cinnamon, or mixed spice are then added. The mixture is bound together with beaten eggs and a small amount of milk to form a firm dough.

The dough is rolled out to approximately 5–8 millimetres thickness and cut into rounds using a fluted cutter, typically 6–8 centimetres (2.4 to 3.1 in (61 to 79 mm)) in diameter. The resulting cakes are then cooked on a lightly greased, moderately heated griddle or bakestone for 3–4 minutes on each side until golden brown.

=== The bakestone ===
The bakestone (Welsh: maen or planc) is central to authentic Welsh cake preparation. Traditional bakestones were carved from local stone, particularly slate or fine sandstone, before the 19th century introduction of cast iron versions. These thick, circular griddles, typically 1.5 centimetres (0.6 in (15 mm)) or more in thickness, provide even heat distribution essential for proper cooking.

Historical bakestones were seasoned with lard and never washed, developing a patina that prevented sticking and contributed to flavour. Modern cooks often substitute heavy cast iron frying pans or electric griddles, though purists maintain that traditional bakestones produce superior results.

== Cultural significance ==
=== Saint David's Day ===
Welsh cakes hold particular significance in Saint David's Day celebrations on 1 March, Wales's national day. They are considered essential components of traditional Saint David's Day meals alongside cawl (Welsh soup), bara brith (fruit bread), and Welsh rarebit. Schools throughout Wales often organise Welsh cake baking activities as part of Saint David's Day observances, introducing children to this aspect of their cultural heritage.

The cakes' association with Welsh national identity extends to diaspora communities worldwide, where they serve as tangible connections to Welsh heritage. Welsh societies in countries including the United States, Australia, and Argentina maintain Welsh cake baking traditions as expressions of cultural continuity.

=== Welsh cuisine and identity ===
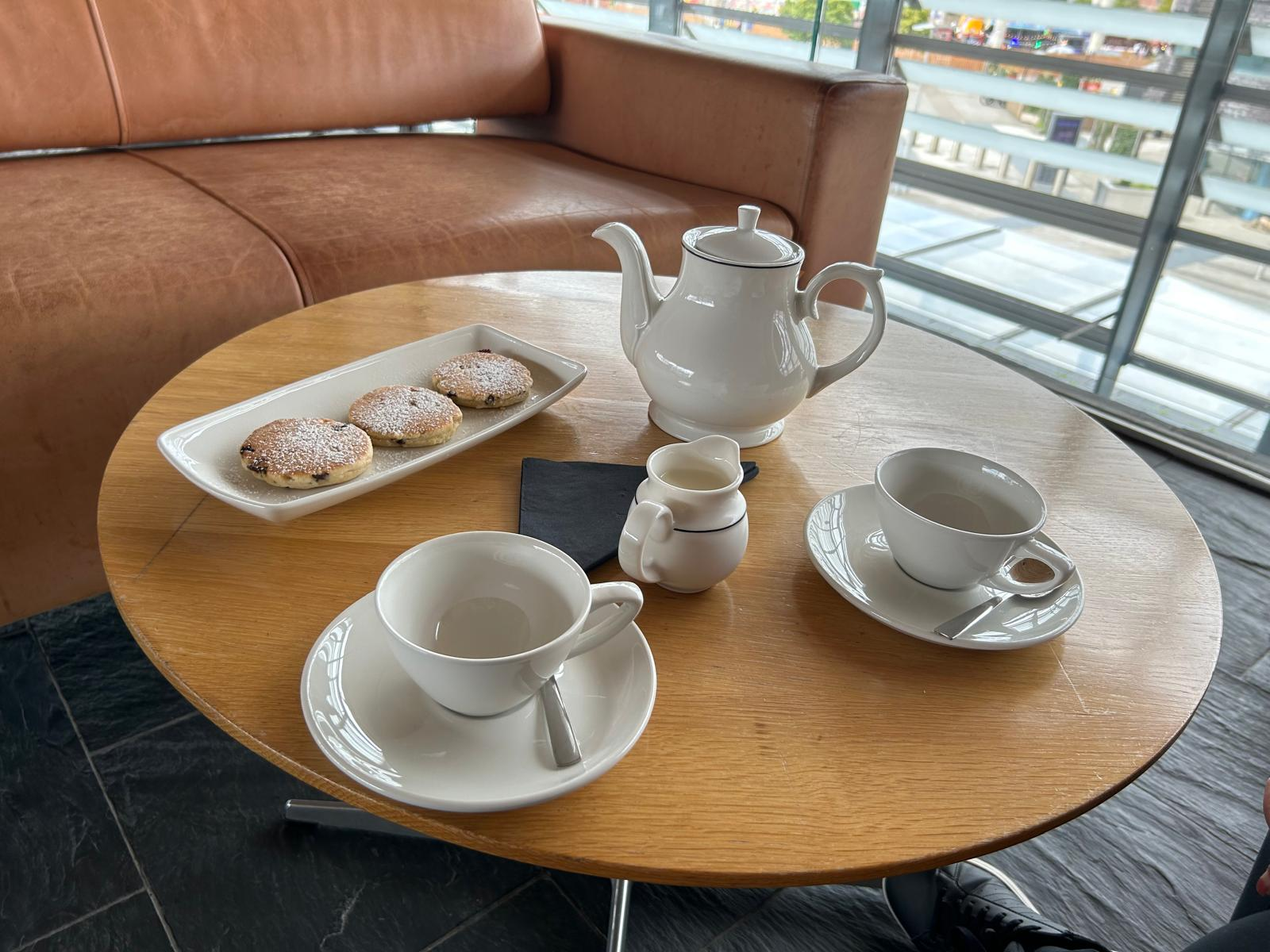
Welsh Cakes at Senedd Cymru

Within the broader context of Welsh cuisine, Welsh cakes represent the practical, resourceful character often associated with Welsh culture. Food historian and cookbook author Nigella Lawson notes that Welsh cakes embody "the resourceful, wholesome, and practical nature of the Welsh people," made from simple ingredients yet requiring skill and attention to achieve the proper texture.

They are frequently cited alongside other symbolic Welsh foods such as cawl, laverbread, and Glamorgan sausage as defining elements of Welsh culinary identity. Unlike many national dishes that evolved from aristocratic or religious traditions, Welsh cakes emerged from working-class necessity, reflecting Wales's industrial heritage.

== Regional variations ==
=== Traditional variations ===
Different regions of Wales developed distinct approaches to Welsh cake preparation. In Glamorgan, some communities used Dutch ovens placed before hot fires when bakestones were unavailable, leading to slightly different textures and the local name "pics." Pembrokeshire traditions often included additional spices, while northern Welsh variations sometimes incorporated honey as a sweetener.

The National Museum of Wales documents regional naming conventions, noting that Welsh names for the cakes typically derived from local terms for bakestones: pice bach (little cakes), tishan lechwan, or tishan ar y mân (bakestone cakes).

=== Modern innovations ===
Contemporary Welsh cake variations include chocolate chip versions, jam-filled splits, and savoury adaptations with herbs or cheese. Some modern bakeries produce gluten-free and vegan versions to accommodate dietary requirements while maintaining traditional cooking methods.

Artisanal producers have experimented with ingredient substitutions, including buttermilk for enhanced flavour, different spice combinations, and alternative dried fruits. However, purists argue that authentic Welsh cakes should adhere to traditional recipes and cooking methods.

== Ingredients and nutrition ==
=== Traditional ingredients ===
Classic Welsh cake recipes call for simple, affordable ingredients that were readily available to 19th-century Welsh households. The standard recipe includes:

- Plain flour
- Butter or lard (traditionally both)
- Caster sugar
- Eggs
- Milk
- Currants or sultanas
- Baking powder
- Salt
- Spices (commonly nutmeg, cinnamon, or mixed spice)

The ratio of ingredients creates a dough firm enough to roll and cut but tender enough to produce the characteristic texture when cooked. Traditional recipes often specify equal weights of flour and fat, similar to shortbread, contributing to the cakes' rich flavour and keeping qualities.

=== Nutritional aspects ===
Welsh cakes provided substantial nutrition for physically demanding work, combining carbohydrates from flour and sugar with fats from butter or lard and protein from eggs and milk. A typical Welsh cake contains approximately 150-200 calories, making them energy-dense foods suitable for manual labourers.

The inclusion of dried fruit added vitamins and minerals, while spices contributed both flavour and traditional medicinal properties. The cooking method produces less fat absorption than deep-frying while maintaining moisture content.

== See also ==
- Heavy cake – Similar griddle cake from Cornwall
- Singing hinny – Griddle cake from northern England
- Girdle scone – Scottish equivalent
- Welsh cuisine
- Saint David's Day
- Coal mining in Wales
