= Glamorgan sausage =

Traditional Welsh vegetarian sausage

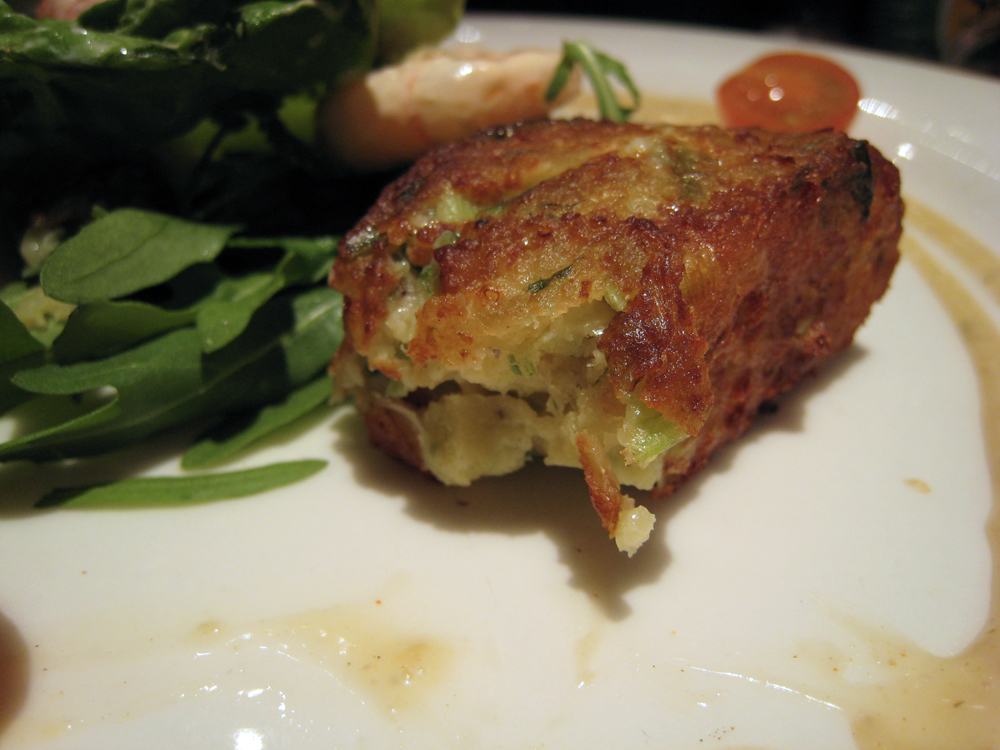
- A Glamorgan sausage
- Alternative names: Welsh: Selsig Morgannwg
- Type: Sausage
- Place of origin: Wales
- Main ingredients: Cheese, leeks
- Ingredients generally used: Breadcrumbs
- Variations: Onions

Glamorgan sausage (Welsh: Selsig Morgannwg) is a traditional Welsh vegetarian sausage for which the main ingredients are cheese (usually Caerphilly), leeks and breadcrumbs. It is named after the historic county of Glamorgan in Wales.

The earliest published mention of the dish is from the 1850s in the book Wild Wales by George Borrow, although earlier records in the Glamorgan Archives show a version which contains pork. The modern vegetarian version became popular during the Second World War when meat was harder to come by, and is now mass-produced by at least two companies. Variations include swapping the leeks for onions, as well as different herbs and spices, and various types of cheese.

== History ==
The origins of Glamorgan sausages are unknown. Research conducted at the Glamorgan Archives in Leckwith discovered that there is at least one traditional recipe which used meat. In a notebook dated between 1795 and 1813, John Perkins, of Ty-draw, Llantrithyd, included 1 pound (0.45 kg) each of lean pork and fat in his recipe for Glamorgan sausage. The spicing was also different from modern versions, calling for the use of cloves, sage and ginger.

The first published mention of them was by George Borrow in his book Wild Wales, written in the 1850s and published in the next decade. He described them as "not a whit inferior to those of Epping"; Epping sausages were skinless meat-based sausages. Borrow visited Y Gwter Fawr (now known as Brynamman); the Tregib Arms has been suggested as the location at which Borrow ate his sausages.

Newspaper advertisements promoting the sale of Glamorgan sausages begin to appear from 1869 onwards, with the first advert placed by pork butcher Henry S. Hammond of 288 Bute Street, Cardiff, placed in the Western Mail on 15 December. Hammond continued to advertise over the next several years, and by 1873 was claiming that the demand necessitated making the sausages on an hourly basis, and referenced other makers of the sausages making theirs days in advance prior to sale. The advert makes it clear that the sausages were made from "choice dairy-fed pork".

Glamorgan sausages are thought to have been originally made with Glamorgan cheese which is no longer made due to the near-extinction of the Glamorgan cattle from which it was produced. They rose in popularity during the Second World War due to rationing limiting the volume of meat. The Welsh Gas Board promoted the sausage in a cookbook published in the 1950s, in which it did not specify the type of cheese to be used.

In 2005, a campaign began to register the Glamorgan sausage under the European Union geographical indications and traditional specialities scheme. This would have resulted in only Glamorgan sausages that were made in Glamorgan being labelled as such. The move was led by Greta Watts-Jones, who runs the Cwrt Newydd company in Cowbridge, which was the only major manufacturer in the area. Her main competitor, Cauldron Foods, is based in Bristol, England. This protection had previously been extended to Welsh lamb and beef. The vote to gain this status, alongside Caerphilly cheese, was held in March 2006 at the European Parliament, but was not passed into law.

== Recipe ==
In modern versions, Caerphilly cheese is used, which is a descendant of the old traditional Glamorgan cheese recipe and lends the same general texture and flavour. The basic recipe calls for a mixture of cheese, leeks and breadcrumbs, although some recipes swap the leeks for onions or spring onions and may add herbs such as parsley or further flavourings such as mustard. The mixture is then rolled into sausage shapes, and then fried. There is no sausage casing used, although egg is used to bind the mixture so that it does not fall apart during the cooking process.

=== Variations ===
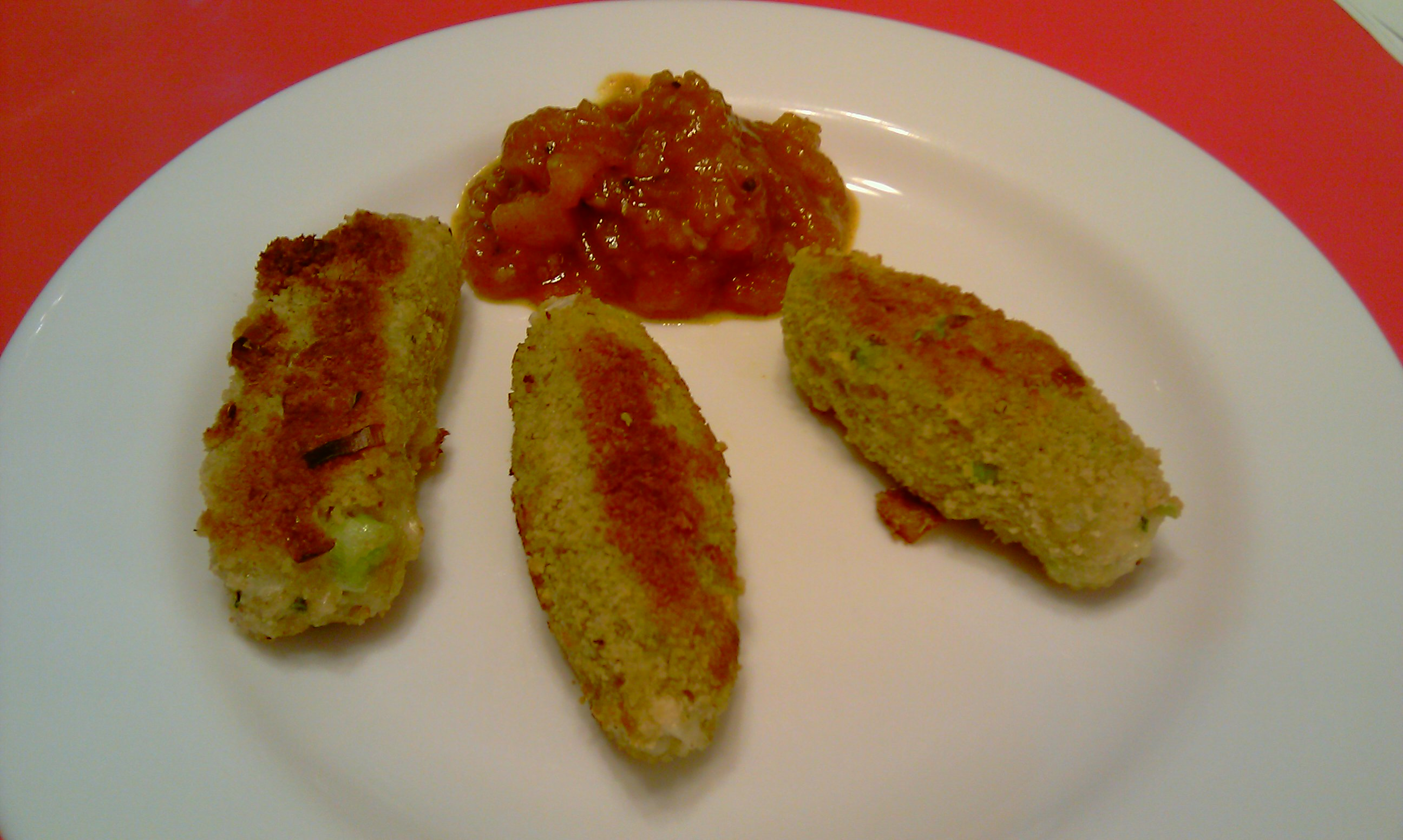
Glamorgan sausages, served with a tomato chutney

In various recipes, other substitutions and additions are suggested. The Hairy Bikers (Dave Myers and Si King) suggest Welsh cheddar as an alternative to Caerphilly and propose that it should be served with a red onion and chilli pepper relish. An Australian recipe suggests Lancashire cheese as an alternative ingredient. Regarding the breadcrumbs, chef Bobby Freeman suggests using half brown and half white breadcrumbs, while the cookbook for the London-based restaurant Canteen proposes using a combination of boiled potatoes and breadcrumbs for the coating of the sausage. There is also a vegan variant of the sausage, using vegan cheese instead.

Cooking techniques for the leeks vary, as some recipes call for them to be mixed in raw, while others suggest browning them first in a frying pan. If left raw, they can lend a crunchier texture to the sausage. Both the Hairy Bikers and Canteen opt for cooking the leeks first. A variety of herbs are used, with Canteen using sage as seen in the Perkins recipe, in addition to nutmeg. The Welsh Gas Board recipe simply called for "mixed herbs", while Felicity Cloake in The Guardian suggested the addition of thyme. For the frying, the gas board and chef Sophie Grigson suggested the use of lard, while the Bikers used vegetable oil. Both Cloake and The Daily Telegraph writer Nigel Godwin proposed frying Glamorgan sausages in butter.

== See also ==
- List of meat substitutes
