= Dyffrynnoedd Nedd a Mellte, a Moel Penderyn =

Protected area in Powys and Neath Port Talbot, Wales

Coordinates: 51°46′10.93″N 3°33′51.82″W

Dyffrynnoedd Nedd a Mellte, a Moel Penderyn (grid reference SN921090) is a 421.1 hectare biological and geological Site of Special Scientific Interest on the border of Neath Port Talbot and Powys, Wales, notified in 1954.

The name of the site means "The valleys of Nedd and Mellte and Moel Penderyn".

This site includes the wooded valleys of the rivers Nedd and Mellte and their tributaries above Pontneddfechan as they pass through a millstone grit and limestone plateau, and the hill of Moel Penderyn, which lies to the east. The rivers have eroded deep, narrow valleys in the plateau, which lies some 300 m above sea level, with gorges, river cliffs, block scree, and waterfalls.

== Biological interest ==
The site is of special biological interest for its extensive and diverse semi-natural woodland, important populations of several flowering plants and supporting outstanding assemblages of mosses, liverworts and lichens.

More than 600 species of plant have been recorded from the site, including a very large proportion of the bryophyte flora of mid and south Wales. It is the most southerly known locality in Britain for Marsh Hawk's-beard (Crepis paludosa).

== Geological interest ==
The site's geological interest lies in the range of geological features, well-exposed in the cliffs and rocky river beds. These include exposures at Moel Penderyn, Craig y Ddinas and Bwa Maen. The geomorphological features within parts of the valleys of the Hepste and Mellte are also of special interest.

== Access ==
Large sections of the site are designated open access land. Other sections are accessible via public footpaths.
