= Flummery =

Starch-based, sweet, soft dessert pudding

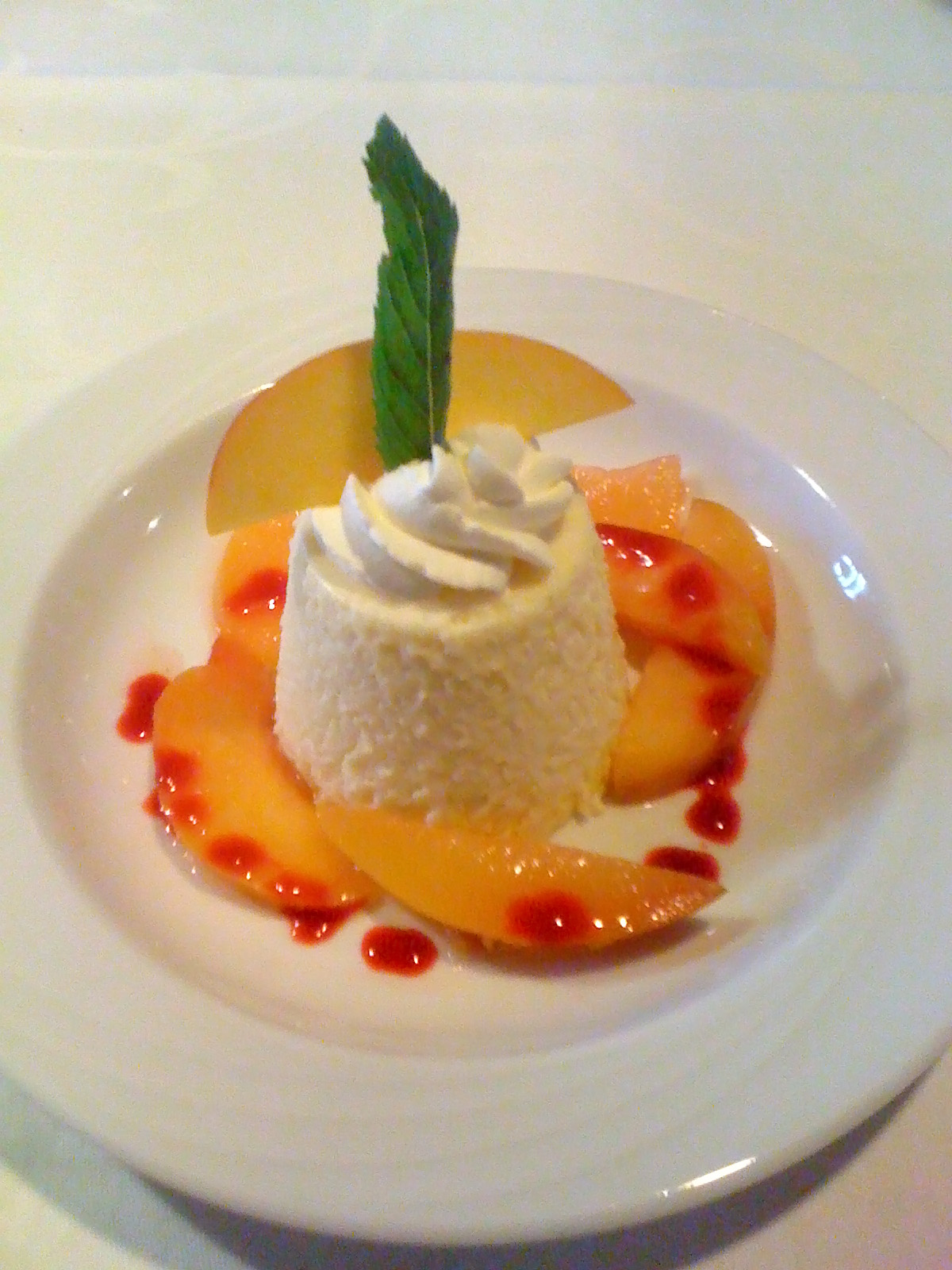
- Flummery from Gerzensee
- Type: Pudding
- Place of origin: Great Britain
- Main ingredients: Starch grains, milk

Flummery is a starch-based, sweet, soft dessert pudding which originated in Great Britain during the early modern period. The word has also been used for other semi-set desserts.

== History and etymology ==
The name is first known in Gervase Markham's 1623 Countrey Contentments, or English Huswife (new ed.) vi. 222 "From this small Oat-meale, by oft steeping it in water and clensing it, and then boyling it to a thicke and stiffe jelly, is made that excellent dish of meat which is so esteemed in the West parts of this Kingdome, which they call Wash-brew, and in Chesheire and Lankasheire they call it Flamerie or Flumerie".

The name is derived from the Welsh word for a similar dish made from sour oatmeal and husks, llymru, which is of unknown origin. It is also attested in variant forms such as thlummery or flamery in 17th and 18th century English. The word "flummery" later came to have generally pejorative connotations of a bland, empty, and unsatisfying food. From this use, "flummery" developed the meaning of empty compliments, unsubstantial talk or writing, and nonsense.

A pint of flummery was suggested as an alternative to 4 ounces (110 g) of bread and a 0.5 imperial pints (0.28 L) of new milk for the supper of sick inmates in Irish workhouses in the 1840s.

== Australasian "flummery" ==
In Australia and New Zealand, post-World War II, flummery was the name given to a completely different dish, a mousse dessert made with beaten evaporated milk, sugar, and gelatine. Also made using jelly crystals, mousse flummery became established as an inexpensive alternative to traditional cream-based mousse. In the Queensland town of Longreach, it was a staple food in the 1970s and in the New South Wales town of Forbes, it was a fall-back dessert in the 1950s. The American writer Bill Bryson described flummery as an early form of the blancmange dessert known in the United States.
