= Moel Penderyn =

Hill (371m) in Rhondda Cynon Taf, Wales

Coordinates: 51.7672°N 3.5395°W

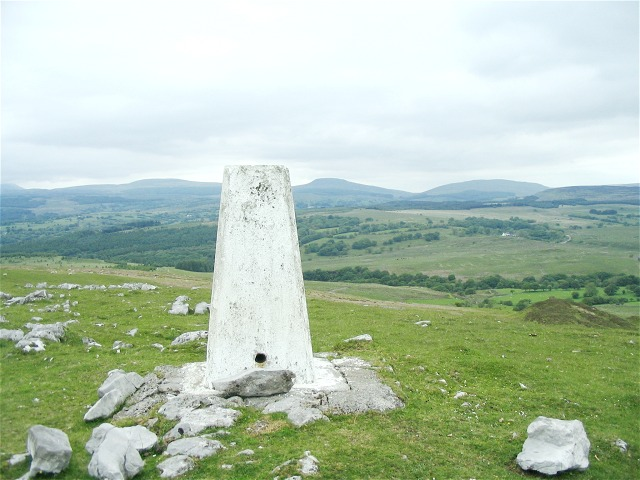
Summit of Moel Penderyn

Moel Penderyn is a hill on the edge of Penderyn village, in the Brecon Beacons National Park in the county borough of Rhondda Cynon Taff, south Wales. It also appeared on older maps as 'Y Foel Penderyn'. Its summit at 371m is marked by a trig point.

Moel Penderyn is in the Dyffrynnoedd Nedd a Mellte, a Moel Penderyn biological and geological Site of Special Scientific Interest.

== Geology ==
The hill is formed from both Carboniferous Limestone rocks and the overlying Twrch Sandstone (former 'Basal Grit') of the Marros Group (former 'Millstone Grit Series'), also of Carboniferous age. It lies along the east-northeast to south-southwest aligned Neath Disturbance, a geological structure associated with the Caledonian Orogeny which locally comprises both a major fault and two tight anticlinal folds.

== Industrial remains ==
The remains of tramways skirt the eastern flanks of the hill and a former tramway incline can still be seen to rise up towards a quarry which once worked deposits in the centre of the hill. Disused quarries working both limestone and gritstone adorn its eastern and northern sides.

== Access ==
The hill is open country and therefore available for walkers to wander at will. Additional access is provided by a public bridleway along its southern flanks and a public footpath between Penderyn village and the waterfall of Sgwd yr Eira on its northeastern edge.
