= Bakestone =

Type of griddle

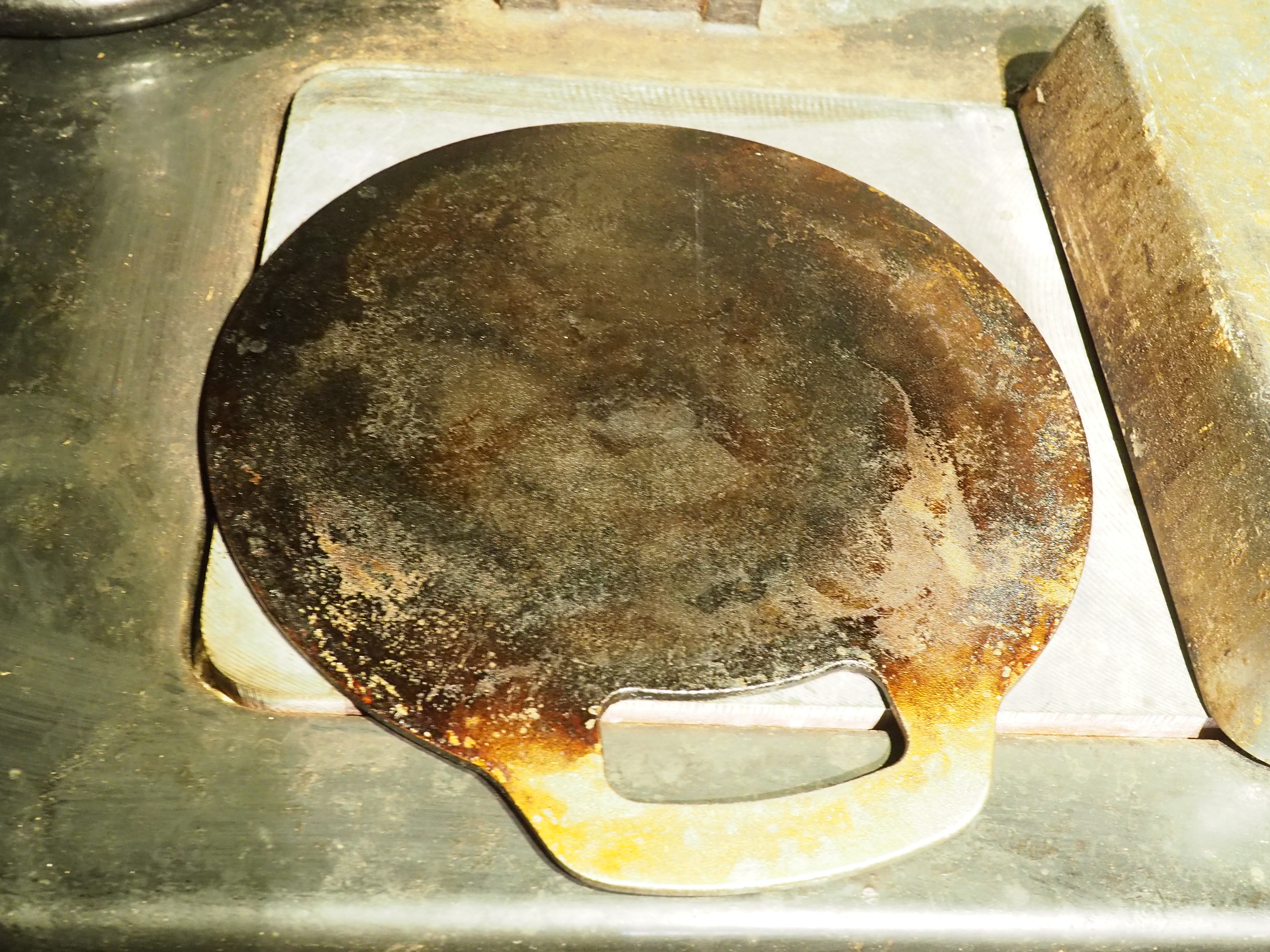
A steel bakestone traditionally used for cooking Welsh cakes

A bakestone is a type of griddle, particularly associated with Wales, where they are used for cooking Welsh cakes.

Before the 19th century, bakestones were made of stone; usually oval and of schistose steatite (soapstone), slate or very fine micaceous flaggy sandstone about 1 1/2 inches (4 cm) thick. Modern bakestones are usually circular with a cut-out handle and are made of cast iron or steel, approximately 1 cm (0.4 in) thick. In Lancashire and the West Riding of Yorkshire the spelling is bakstone and are primarily used to cook very thin, yeasted oatcakes or riddle bread.

New bakestones are seasoned by burning a mixture of lard or oil and salt, giving a non-stick surface and protecting against rust. The blackened surface is not removed when the bakestone is cleaned and bakestones are believed to improve with repeated use.
