= Penderyn, Rhondda Cynon Taf =

Village in Rhondda Cynon Taf, Wales

Coordinates: 51.765°N 3.530°W

Penderyn
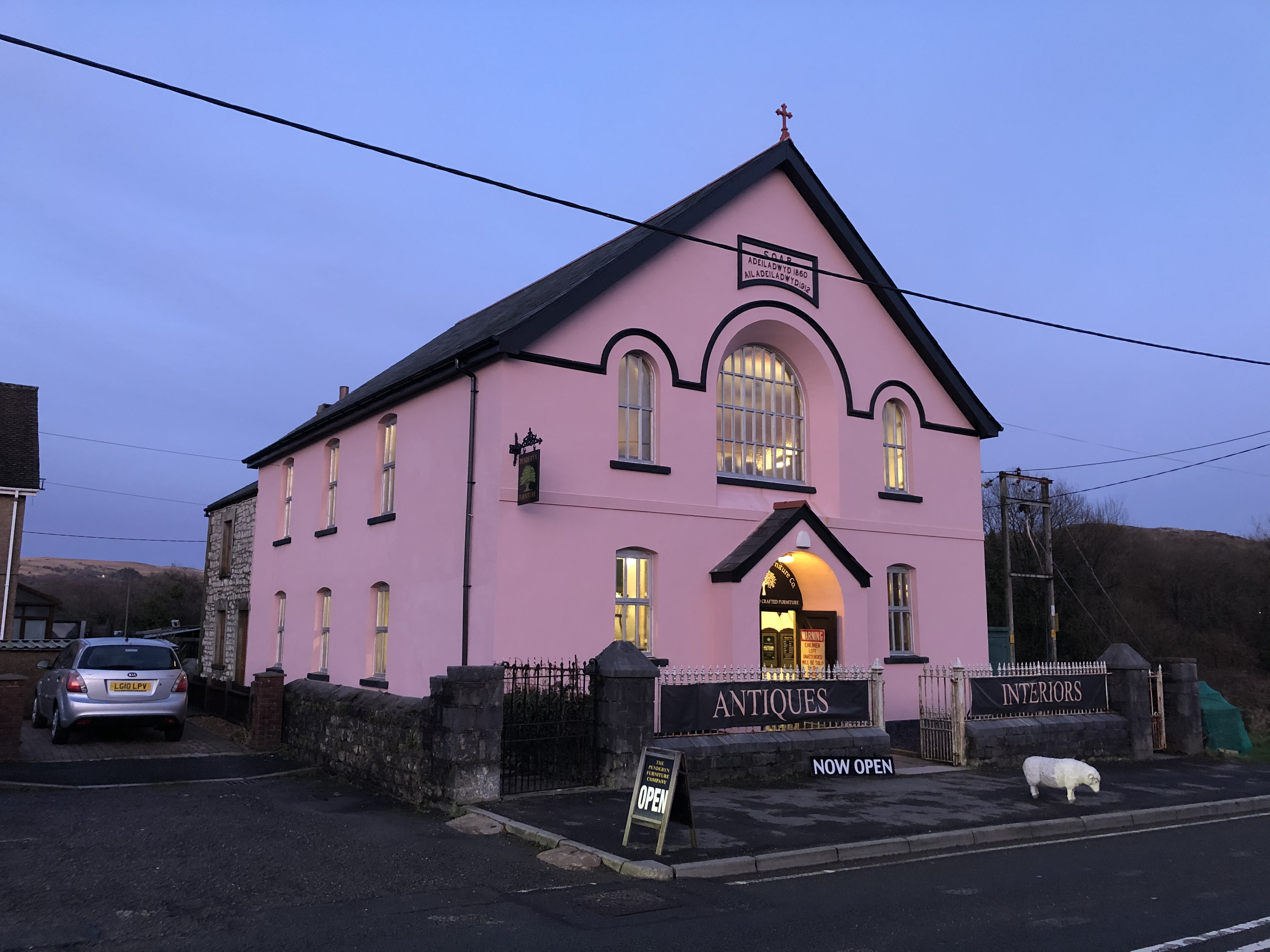
- The former Soar Chapel

- Location within Rhondda Cynon Taf
- OS grid reference: SN946089
- Community: Hirwaun
- Principal area: Rhondda Cynon Taf
- Preserved county: Mid Glamorgan
- Country: Wales
- Sovereign state: United Kingdom
- Post town: ABERDARE
- Postcode district: CF44
- Dialling code: 01685
- Police: South Wales
- Fire: South Wales
- Ambulance: Welsh
- UK Parliament: Merthyr Tydfil and Aberdare
- Senedd Cymru – Welsh Parliament: Cynon Valley

Penderyn (Welsh pronunciation: [pɛndˈɛrɪn]) is a rural village in the Cynon Valley, Rhondda Cynon Taf, South East Wales, located near the village and community of Hirwaun. The name is a combination of two Welsh words: pen, which means "head" or "end", and deryn, a contracted form of aderyn, "bird".

== Location ==
The village lies on the A4059 road between Hirwaun and Brecon and is the last settlement on that road in the county of Rhondda Cynon Taf before the border with Powys to the north. The village sits just within the southern boundary of the Brecon Beacons National Park. The River Cynon passes through the area.

There are four disused churches and chapels in Penderyn: Jerusalem Chapel (Calvinistic Methodist, now a house), Siloam Chapel (Baptist, a grade II listed building), Soar Chapel (Independent, now an antiques shop) and St Cynog's Church (Church in Wales).

Penderyn is the home of Penderyn Whisky, whose distillery is located opposite the local school. The award-winning single malt whisky was launched in 2004 and was the first distilled in Wales for over 100 years.

== History ==
David Watkin Jones, bardic name Dafydd Morganwg, documented in his 1874 Hanes Morganwg (History of Glamorgan) that in 1666 one "Mayber" built a small charcoal-fired furnace near Llygad Cynon, the source of the River Cynon, in an uninhabited place in the parish of Penderyn (ym mhlwyf Penderyn).

There was no iron ore in the vicinity of the furnace. Consequently, supplies of it needed to be obtained from elsewhere. However, the furnace was successful: it produced on average a ton of iron a week, which was taken to Brecon for finishing, i.e. forging, where it would have enjoyed "the advantage of proximity to English markets".

W.E. Minchinton (1961) documented that The Hirwaun Works was founded in 1757 by two partners, John Maybery and John Wilkins, his brother-in-law.

The partnership leased the mineral rights for the land from Lord Windsor. Limestone was available locally. The partners hoped to supply the local Hirwaun furnace with the iron ore extracted from the site. The works flourished for a time. However, it was severely hit by the introduction of non-importation agreements by the American colonies which broke away from the British crown in 1775. Consequently, the works was then leased to John Wasse of Stafford and William King of Bristol. Macinnes (1939) documented that on 27th May 1721, John King and Walter King gave a power of attorney to three Virginians to manage an iron-works. Quilici (1976) documented that John King and Walter King were brothers and partners in trading ventures in Bristol. John King was the leader of the family and Walter King was a mariner. King died shortly afterwards, and Wasse was unable to carry on the business alone. Consequently, in 1777 the works reverted to John Maybery.

The iron works briefly recovered. But then it declined and was taken over by two sons of John Wilkins, Walter Wilkins and Jeffreys Wilkins, both of whom worked in the bank that their father had established. In 1779 a Welsh forge master sued the partnership for breach of contract. In the following year the lease of the works was transferred to Anthony Bacon of Cyfarthfa, which, after his death in 1786, was acquired by his two sons, Anthony and Thomas.

At some point Penderyn became an agricultural village, which supplied the growing needs of the nearby local market town of Aberdare.

Until the county's inclusion in Powys in 1974 the village was in the county of Brecknockshire.

== Governance ==
Penderyn is in the community of Hirwaun and, at the lowest tier of local government, is represented by Hirwaun & Penderyn Community Council. Penderyn is one of two electoral wards in the community, which elects 4 members to the community council.

For elections to Rhondda Cynon Taf County Borough Council, Penderyn is covered by the Hirwaun, Penderyn and Rhigos Electoral Ward

Capel Siloam, Penderyn, where Dewi Cynon was precentor for 50 years

== Notable people ==
- Gwyn Morgan (born 1954), Welsh-language writer, lives in Penderyn
- David Wynne (1900–1983), composer, born in Penderyn
- David Davies 1853-1937 (Dewi Cynon), the author of Hanes Plwyf Penderyn (1905, 1924)
- Lewis Lewis (Lewsyn yr Heliwr), transported for his part in the Merthyr Rising of 1831

Dic Penderyn (Richard Lewis, 1807/8–1831), the central figure of the Merthyr Rising of 1831, was not from the village but was from Aberavon.

== See also ==
- Moel Penderyn – a hill above the village
