= Cuisine of Gower =

Welsh regional cuisine

The cuisine of Gower, a peninsula in south Wales, is based on ingredients grown, raised or collected on or around the peninsula. The cuisine is based on fresh ingredients with recipes based around a fish or meat dish. Until the twentieth century, the peninsula was virtually cut off from other markets due to poor roads, and no rail connection. The result was that Gower became self-sufficient in food.

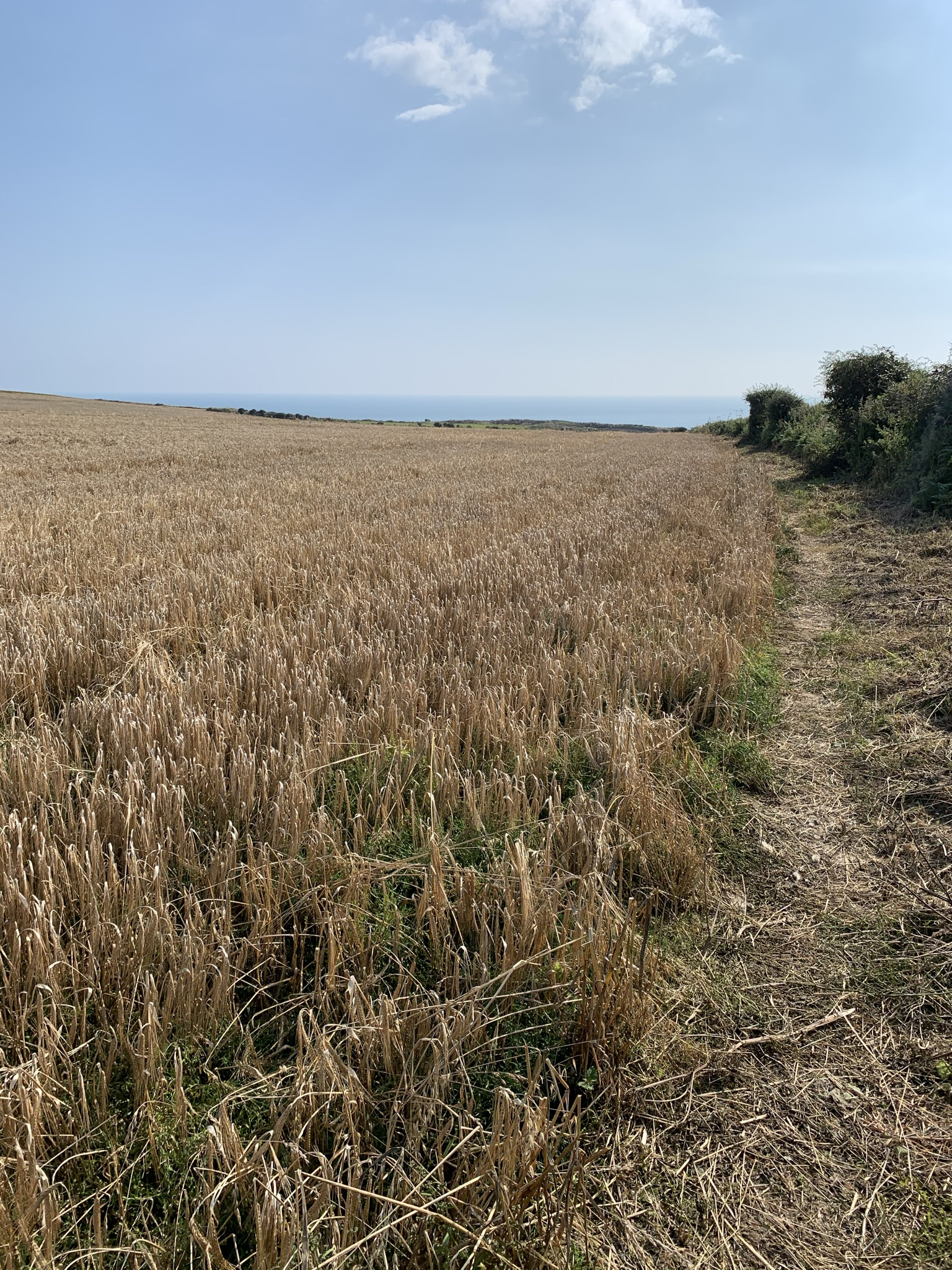
Wheat field near Paviland in Gower

Gower people also developed their own dialect of English, known as the Gower dialect, and their own traditions, which have since died out. The population of the peninsula was employed in agriculture, fishing, labour on the farms and larger country estates, weaving and, in the north, coal mining and cockling. With the expansion of motorized transport and road improvements, Gower became a popular tourist destination. Many residents now travel from Gower to work in the nearby city of Swansea. Much of the agricultural produce is now sold at Swansea Market, local farmers' markets, and further afield.

== Background ==
In the 18th century, surveys indicate that crops grown in Gower included corn, hay, flax, hemp, hops and fruit. Livestock kept included sheep, cattle, pigs, geese, fowl and bees. Many Gower villages were self-sufficient in food, and residents paid a yearly rent to the lord of the manor for fishing rights. In south and west Gower a feudal or manorial system of open fields, and related areas of common land for the grazing of livestock, had developed after the Norman invasion. The land remained linked to this feudal pattern for many centuries afterwards, and tithes were paid in kind, comprising one lamb out of ten, a tenth of the wool shorn, and a tenth part of the grain crop.

Later, the inclosure acts consolidated the arable land holding but Gower's common lands were left untouched. North and east Gower retained the traditional Welsh landholding pattern, based on a family group and located around the gwely, or homestead. All rights of grazing, common pasture, and arable allocations stemmed from this system. The Norman and Welsh areas of Gower were roughly divided by the common lands of Clyne, Fairwood, Pengwern and Cefn Bryn.

The geology of the Gower Peninsula is made up of limestone, coal measures and old red sandstone. The Board of Agriculture's report for South Wales of 1814 commented:

"The soil in this limestone is excellent for both the tillage and pasture, being a brownish marly loam, of good tenacity in some places; in others, on a few degrees of declivity, light and somewhat sandy, so as to be occasionally damaged by the larvae of the cock-chaffer. It produces with good management, plenty of all kinds of grain, and swards naturally with the sweetest grasses".

The area has a mild climate due to the effects of the Gulf Stream near the coast. This results in mostly a frost-free winter in the south-west of the peninsula.

== Vegetables ==
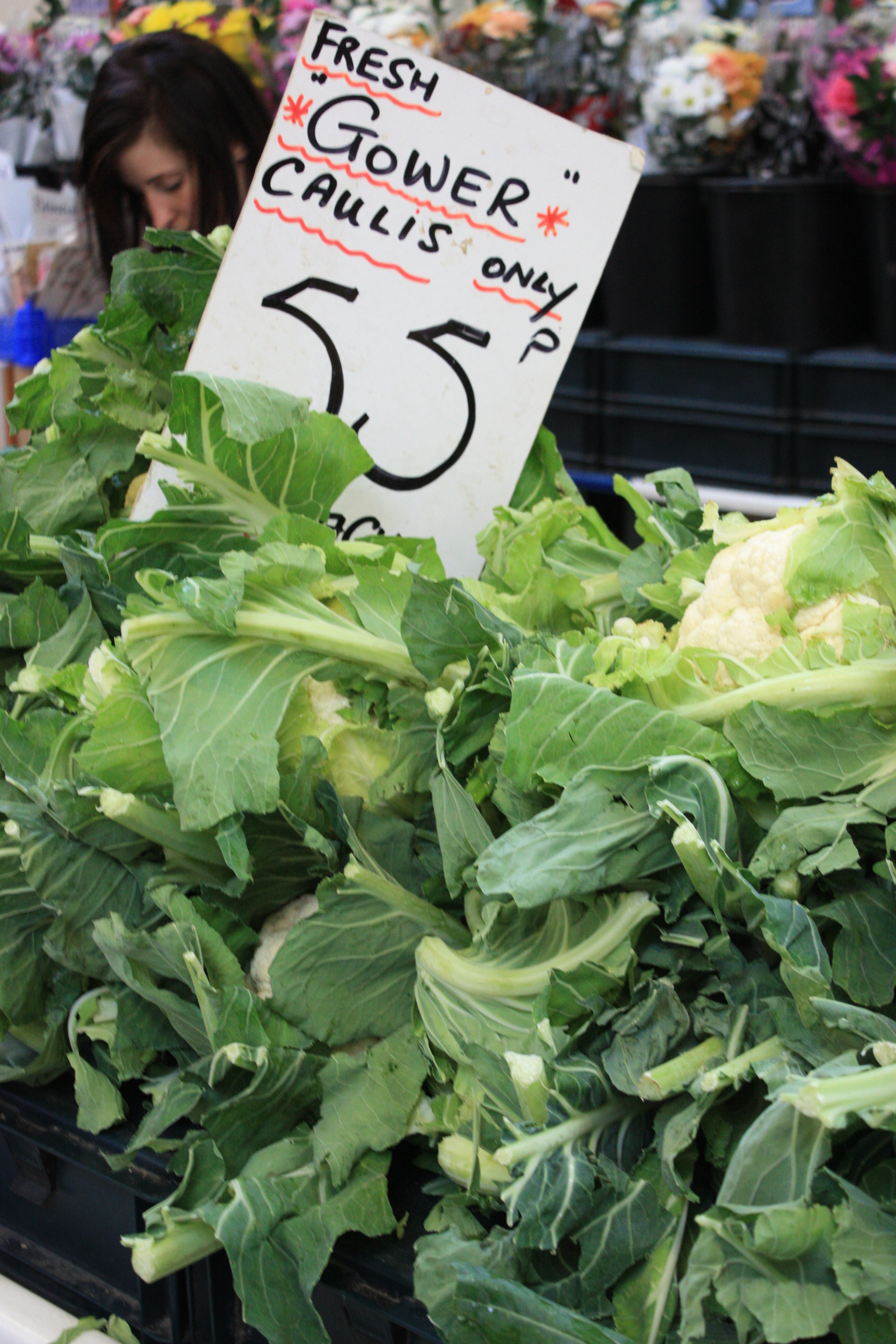
Gower cauliflowers on sale at a Swansea Market stall

The combination of geology and climate means that Gower is well known for its root, and other, vegetables. These include potatoes, cauliflower, and swedes. In the case of cauliflower, a frost-free climate is required when the curd is developing. The area around Rhossili is an important supply area. Thousands of cases of cauliflowers are transported from here to shops nationwide during the winter months. Local farmers' markets and Swansea Market sell fresh Gower vegetables, as do farms such as Nicholaston Farm, owned by the Beynon family, which supplies asparagus, beans, and peas.

== Meat and game ==
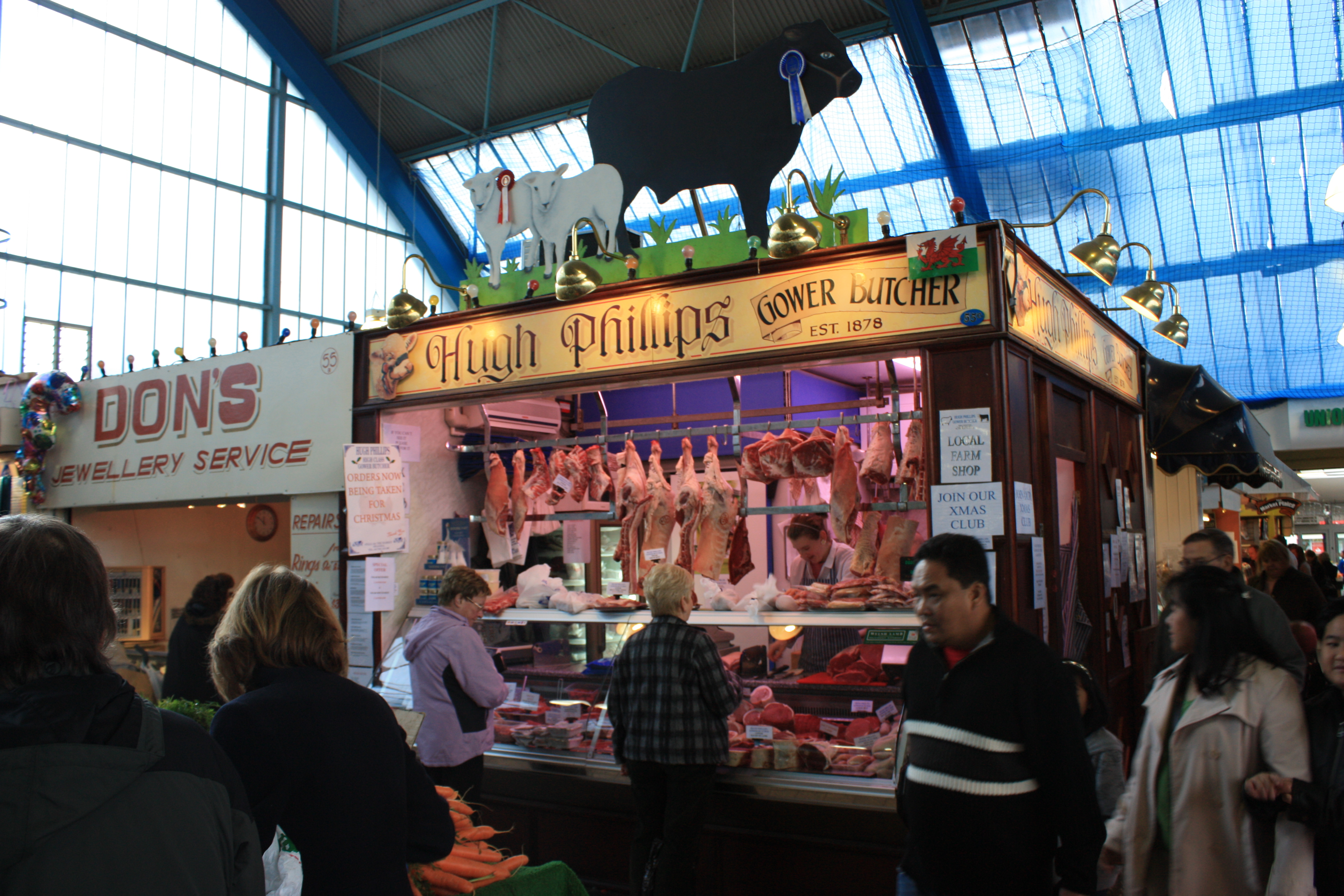
Hugh Phillips, Gower Butcher, Swansea Market

Gower is well known for the quality of its lamb. On the sandstone areas, such as Cefn Bryn, Davies comments: "The sheep feeding thereon are noted for fineness of wool and well-flavoured mutton." Of particular note is the quality of the lamb grazing on the salt marshes of the Burry Inlet. The animals spend their life grazing on a diet of salt marsh grasses, samphire, sea lavender, sorrel and thrift, which gives the meat a fine flavour. Gower salt marsh lamb was awarded registered as a Protected Designation of Origin under UK law in 2021. and (despite opposition of France) under EU law in 2023.

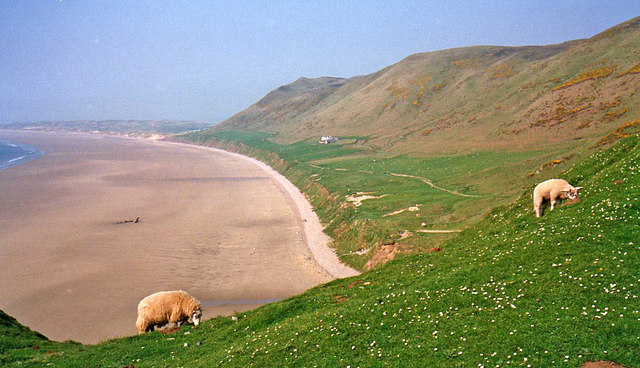
Welsh Mountain sheep grazing at Rhossili

Welsh Black cattle are raised for beef, and these can be found on the Penrice Estate, near Oxwich. The beef is supplied locally to restaurants, such as the Fairy Hill Hotel. In the 21st century, Welsh black beef is being newly appreciated; it is believed to be one of the most ancient breeds in Britain, resembling cattle existing in the country before the Roman invasion.

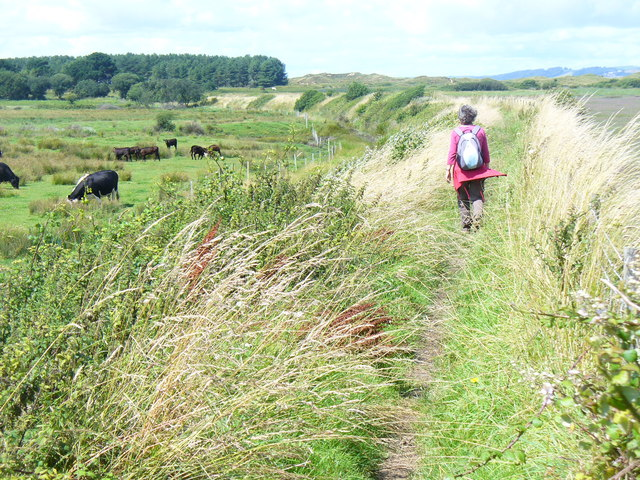
The Causeway, Cwm Ivy, is a sea wall, built in 1638, that has Cwm Ivy Marsh on its western side, which is a freshwater marsh, and Landimore Marsh on its eastern side, which is a saltwater marsh. The eastern bank is a high stone wall about 10-12 feet high. Cattle graze the freshwater marsh and sheep graze the saltwater marsh giving the local delicacy of Gower salt marsh lamb. In 2014 the sea breached the Causeway and is slowly reclaiming the freshwater marsh

Rabbits are plentiful around the coast of Gower. While living at Rhossili, Colin Pressdee created rabbit casserole with faggots. The faggots give the dish the bulk needed for hard-working locals.

Meat and game can be bought at a number of local butchers' shops. Paul Tucker and Son trade at Penclawdd, selling locally sourced beef, lamb (including Llanrhidian salt marsh lamb), poultry, and pork, and their own bacon, faggots, and award-winning beef and lamb burgers. Howells is another Penclawdd butcher, and supplies salt marsh lamb from the marshes at Llanrhidian. Weobly Castle Farm sells Gower salt-marsh lamb. In Swansea, Gower butcher Hugh Philips and his family have had a stall at Swansea Market since 1878, when his grandfather started the business. Meat is sourced from the family farm in Gower and neighbouring farms. They specialise in Welsh lamb, seasonal salt-marsh lamb, and traditional beef breeds, such as the Welsh Black. They also make home-made sausages.

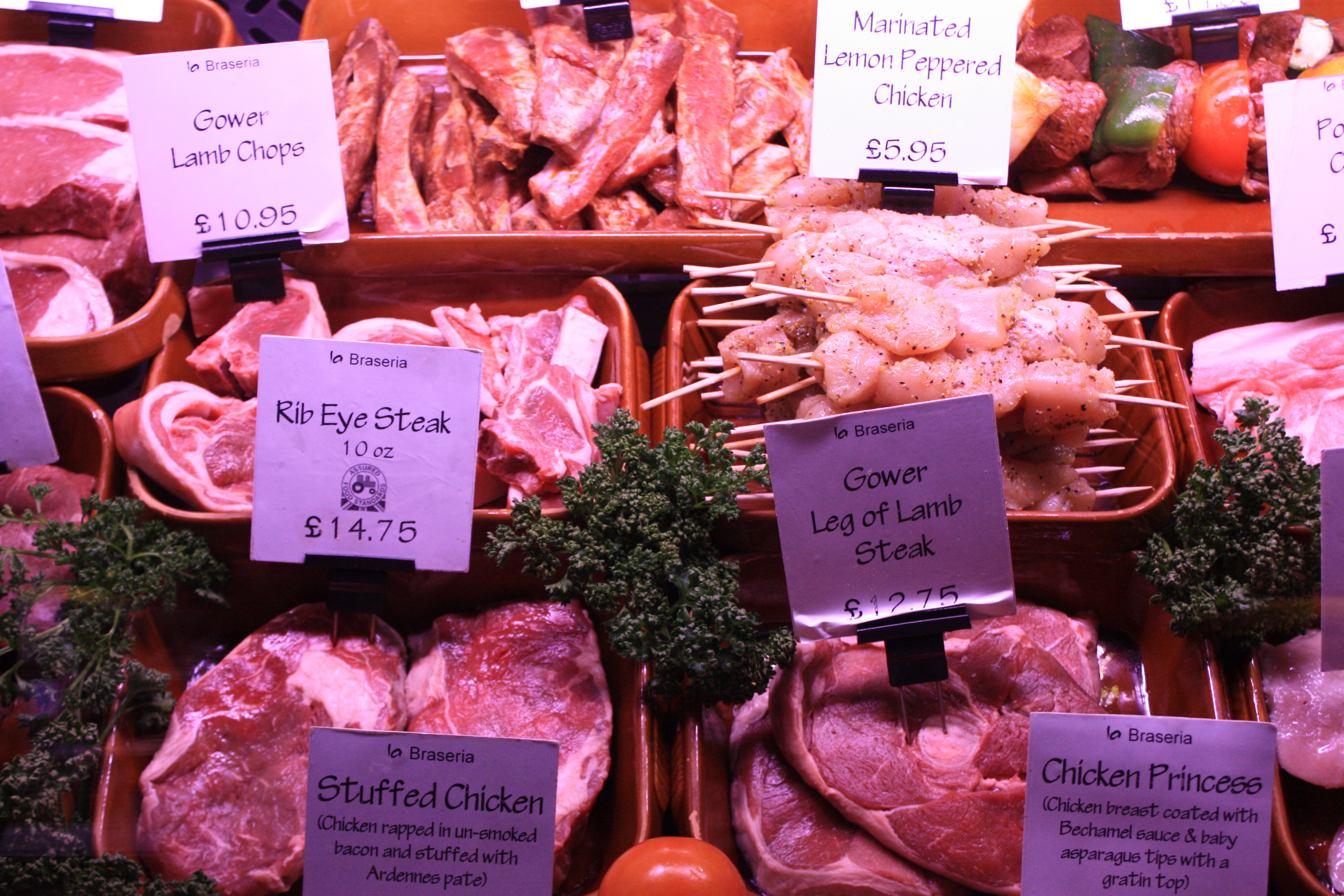
Gower meat selection at La Braseria restaurant, Swansea

== Fish and seafood ==
Laverbread (Welsh: bara lawr) is made from the seaweed porphyra umbilicalis. The seaweed is purplish-black and found strewn throughout the intertidal area of Gower, particularly the upper levels. It is more common in the winter period, from late autumn onwards, where the rocks are near, or overlain with, sand. This seaweed can be found on most of the rocky beaches of Gower; it appears to be in greater volume, probably because it is less frequently collected for laverbread than before. Traditionally, it is boiled for hours to render it into a thick puree. It is sold in Swansea Market but, if gathered fresh, it can be deep-fried into crisps. Other recipes include laverbread breakfast cake, laverbread and cockle pâté, laverbread with streaky bacon, and laverbread with mashed potato. There are still some small producers of Gower laverbread, but larger quantities are sourced from the west coast of Scotland. A Gower breakfast can comprise griddled bacon with cockles, laverbread and baked eggs.

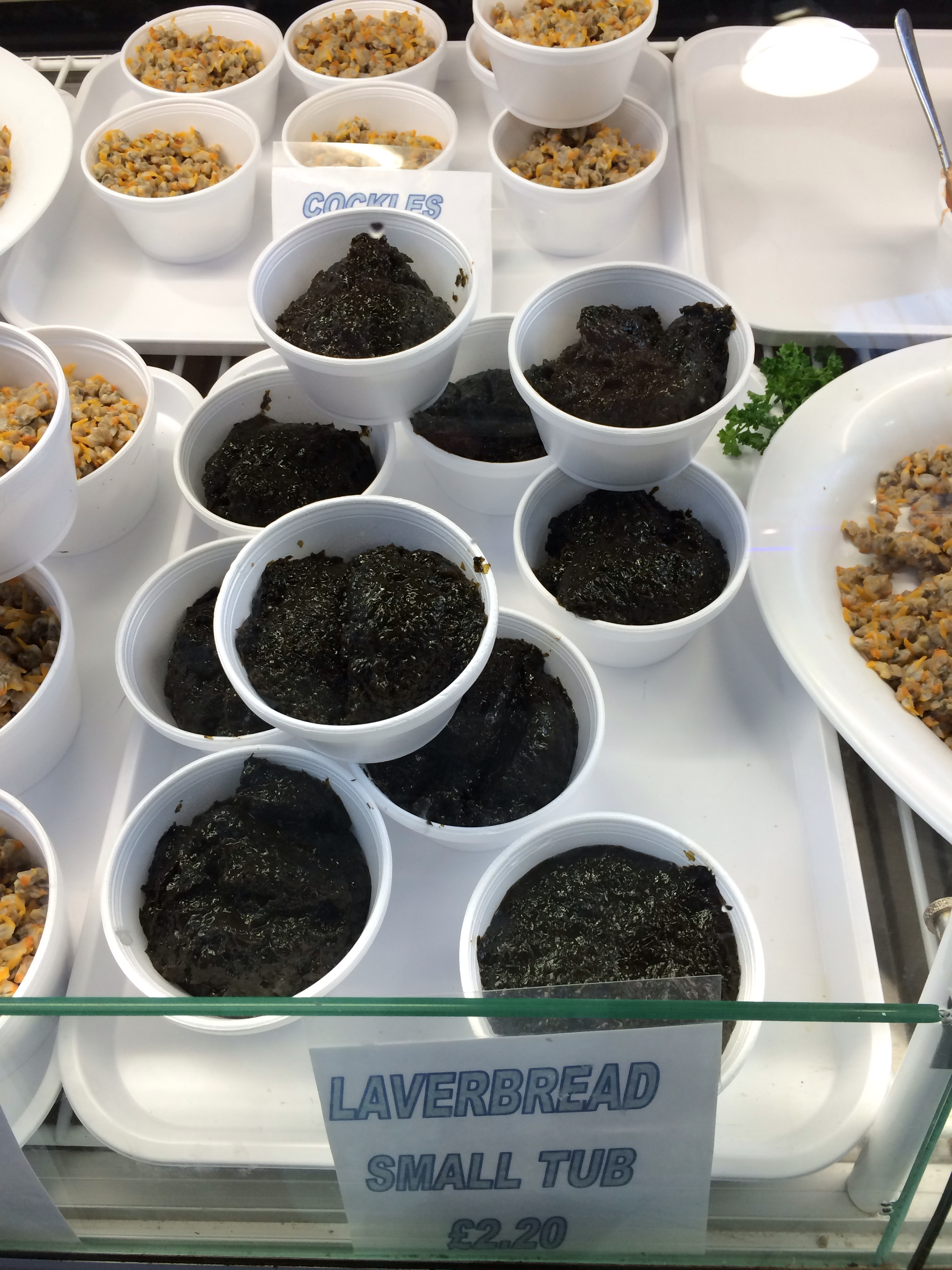
Laverbread and cockles on sale at Swansea Market

Crabbing (which also collectively includes lobstering) was a traditional Gower craft. The true crabber used only his hands to pull out crabs from holes that he knew so well that he could find them at night. A hook, traditionally made from the back of a worn out scythe, was used only for difficult and deep-seated crabs. Each crabber used to have a personal area of rocks to work from, and handed his knowledge down through the family, with youngsters learning the crab holes by carrying the sacks for an elder.

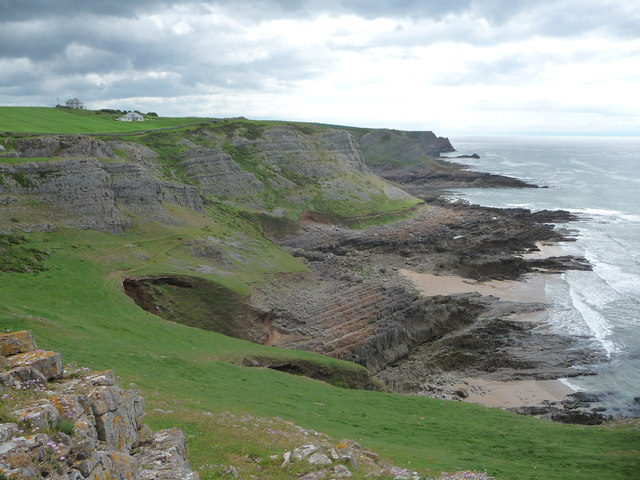
The limestone coast of south Gower east of Mewslade Bay showing the limestone rock strata and coves which were once subject to crabbing and the cliffs of which are grazed by Welsh Mountain sheep

Legendary Gower crabbers, working before the Second World War, included Margaret Ann Bevan, of High Priest, and Johnny "Crab" Beynon, of Fernhill. Margaret Ann wore hobnailed boots without shoelaces, a long skirt, which she threw over her shoulder to keep out of the water, and no knickers. She waded out to the crab holes before they were fully uncovered by the tide to save time. Gower is washed by the Bristol Channel, which has one of the highest tidal ranges in the world; this exposes large expanses of rocks and sand at low tide, and the layered strata of the limestone rock provides many holes and ledges where crabs and lobster hide. The best crabs are caught under ledges. Welsh lobster fishermen often catch crabs as a bycatch, but a hen crab can have delicately flavoured dark meat. When buying crabs, it is best to select a smaller specimen that is heavy for its size, and has a solid, firm shell. Crab makes a good soup, especially in season, when they are relatively cheap. They also make fishcake, croustade and stew. Crabs and lobsters can be bought at Swansea Market. The male lobster is best used for salads, as it has large claws containing succulent meat. Female lobster is better for dishes with sauces, as the roe inside gives great depth to the flavour of sauces.

North Gower is famous for cockles. Families from the villages of Crofty and Penclawdd have been working the cockle beds of the Burry Inlet for generations. The cooked cockles are then sold in Swansea and are one of the specialities of Swansea Market Cockles are removed from the sand when the beds are exposed at low tide. The cockle gatherers follow the receding tide and, while the mud is covered by a very shallow layer of water, they gather the cockles by hand, raking them out of the sand assisted by a scrape. This is a curved metal blade with a handle. This is used for breaking the surface of the sand. The work is done in all weathers, with starts as early as 3am in the summer.

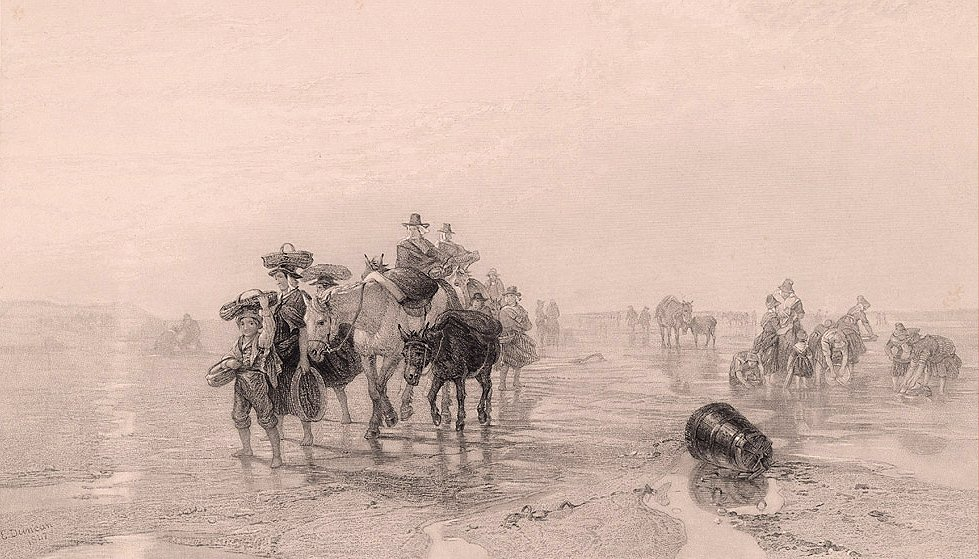
Cockle gatherers on the Llanrhidian Sands, Gower – early morning, etching from a painting by Edward Duncan, 1849, National Library of Wales

Originally, the cockles were collected by a donkey pulling a flat cart, this was replaced by pony and flat cart, and nowadays a Land Rover is used. Gathering cockles is regulated by The Burry Inlet Cockle Fishery Order, 1965. Two grades of cockles are gathered: boiling cockles are smaller and cooked locally before being taken to market; shell cockles are larger and obtained by more intensive sieving, using larger-meshed sieves on the cockle beds. Cockles need to be thoroughly washed clean, and cooked, so it is best to buy them from a cockle producer. Fresh cockles should be soaked in a bowl of lightly salted water for 24 hours so that they clean themselves naturally. A spoonful of wholemeal flour or oatmeal in the water assists the purging process. Traditionally, cockles formed part of a breakfast with Welsh bacon and eggs. However, as the cockle is a small clam, it can be adapted to a wide range of cooking styles from Mediterranean to American, and they make a particularly good chowder. Every year Swansea holds a Cockle Festival at the end of September, and local chefs demonstrate a wide range of dishes, using fresh Penclawdd cockles.

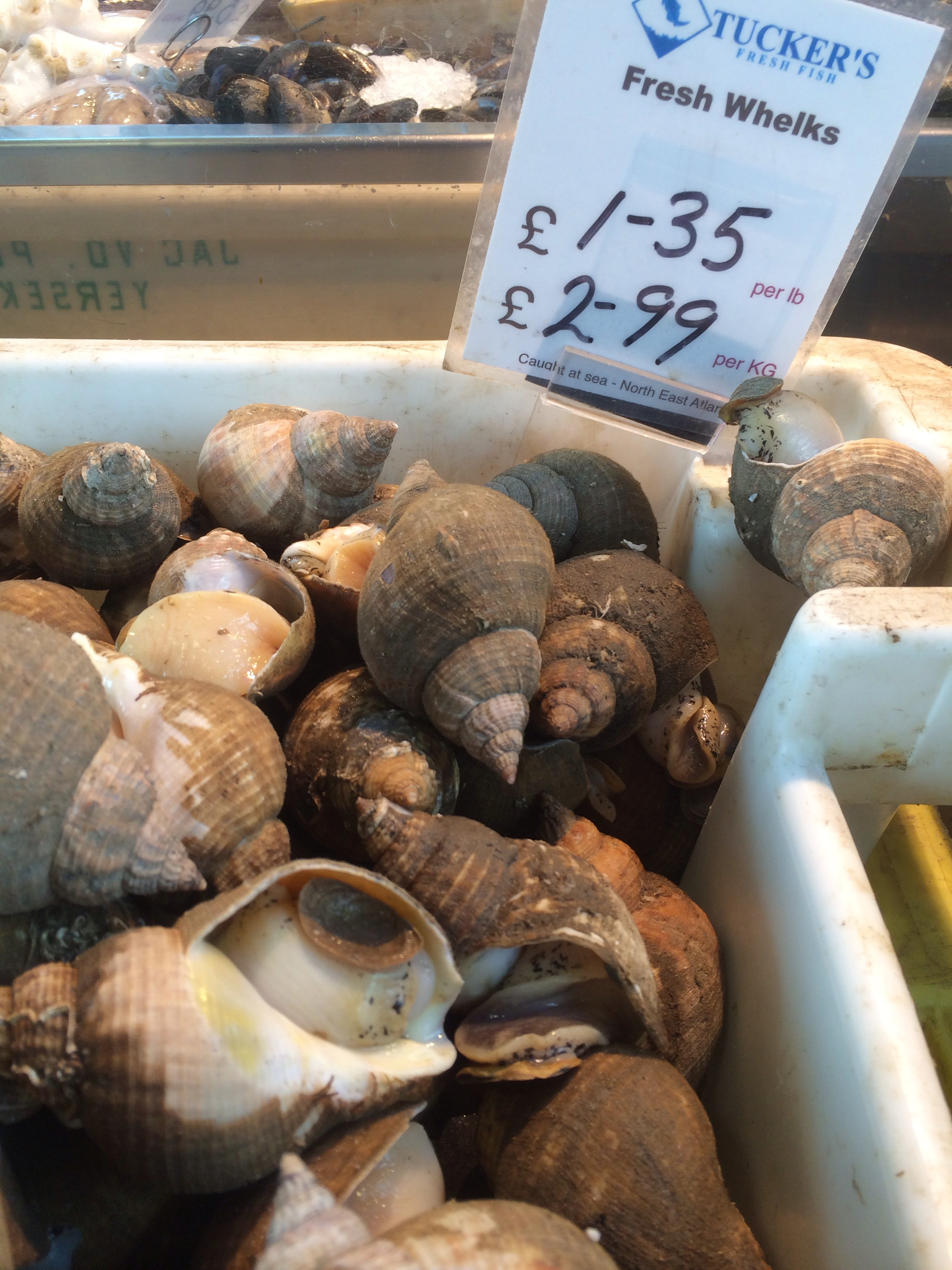
Fresh Whelks collected from Swansea Bay on sale at Swansea Market. Most British whelks are exported to the Far East, they are low in calories and high in protein and vitamin B12 and can be included in a stir fry or sautéed with garlic butter and parsley.

Oyster fisheries have existed in South Wales since the reign of Elizabeth I Two of the most important beds were located at Swansea Bay, between Mumbles Head and Port Eynon. At one time, Mumbles had one of the largest oyster fisheries in Europe, exporting millions of oysters every year to be eaten by the urban poor. Fishing usually occurred only during the winter months of December, January and February. During years of peak production, oysters were almost the basic food of many Mumbles households and often the first food of Mumbles-born youngsters. They were often fried in an omelette, or in breadcrumbs. They could also be eaten in a Carpetbag steak, this is a steak one inch, or an inch and a half, thick, sliced inwards, filled with oysters and grilled. This classic Victorian dish was, according to Pressdee, heavy on oysters and light on beef, because oysters were so cheap. It delivered a double punch, with a rich oyster sauce as an accompaniment William Ewart Gladstone visited Mumbles on many occasions and always ate a dish of oysters. He gave his name to The Old Gladstone Restaurant in Mumbles, which was once renowned for its Carpetbag steaks. The most usual oyster combination was Oysters Fried with Bacon. Oysters would be eaten this way on the oyster dredging skiffs. They would be fried on a small stove placed in the forecastle. In 1871 there were 188 Mumbles boats licensed to dredge for oysters, but by 1934 only two remained. Over-fishing and pollution ended the industry in the 1930s, but stocks now seem to be regenerating. A modern oyster starter is Gratin of Oysters with Herb Crust

Prawns can be caught in summer and autumn in gullies and rock pools all around the Welsh coast, including Gower. They can be caught with a push net when the tide recedes. One of the most famous local shrimpers was a blind fisherman from Mumbles. He was very accomplished at netting prawns and his portrait hangs in the Glynn Vivian Art Gallery in Swansea.

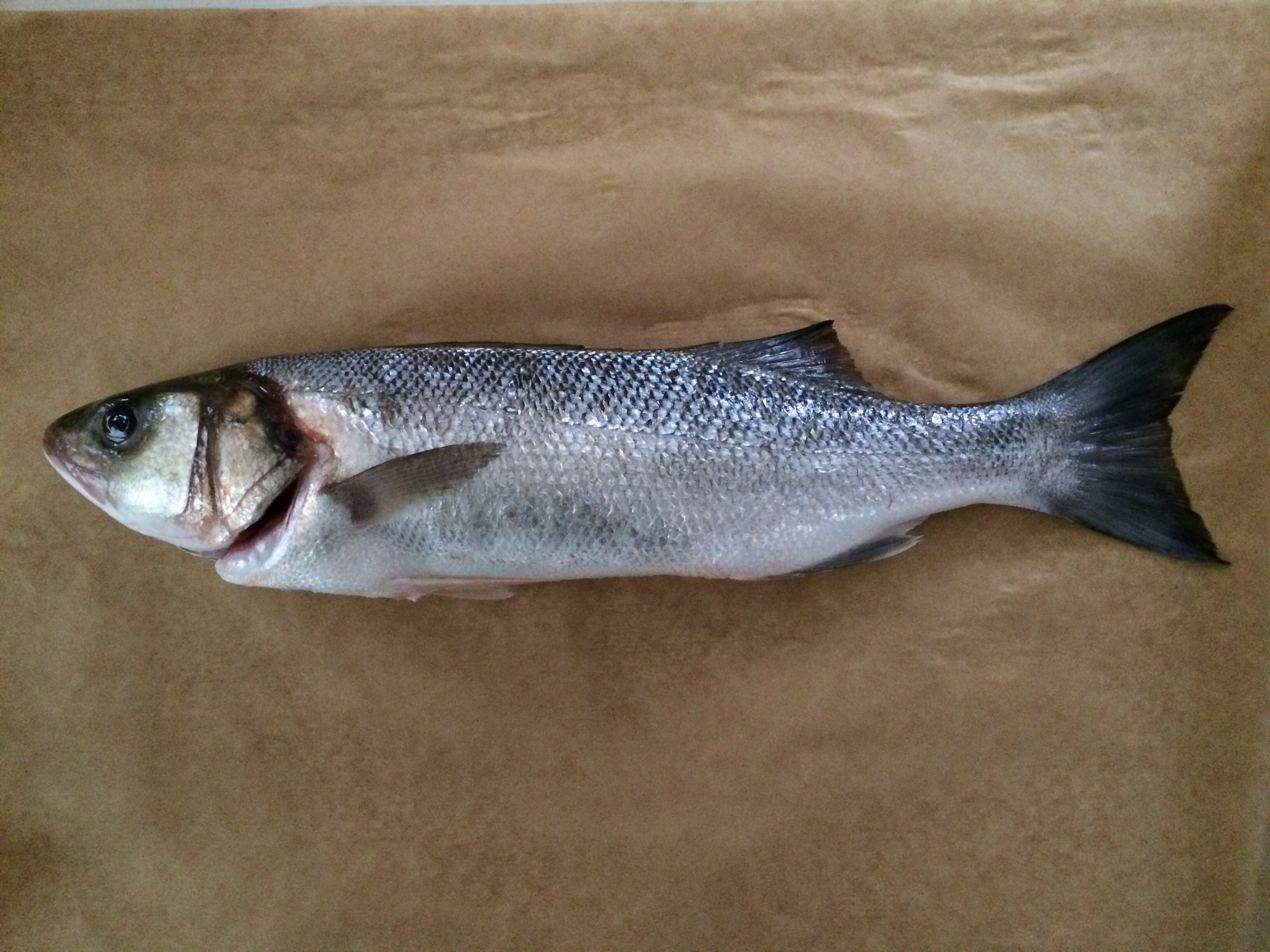
Line caught Sea Bass from Gower sold at Swansea Market

Swansea still has a considerable fishing fleet of small boats, and these have replaced the city's original deep-water fishery. The vessels go out on short, one-day, voyages and return with fresh fish, which are sold on the fish slabs of Swansea Market and at the Swansea fish docks. Mackerel is a summer and autumn visitor and is eaten fresh. It can be smoked, marinaded or made into a pâté. It can be caught around the coast of Gower and, in August, shoals of harvest mackerel can be found chaffing the sea in pursuit of their own fry. Sea bass is said by Pressdee to be one of Gower's most beautiful sea fish; it thrives in rough weather and can be caught in the rock gullies of the Gower headlands as it searches for crabs. Fishing trawlers often land big quantities of squid and cuttlefish in the summer, and this can be inexpensive. They can be eaten with charred vegetables grilled on the traditional flat bakestone, or stuffed.

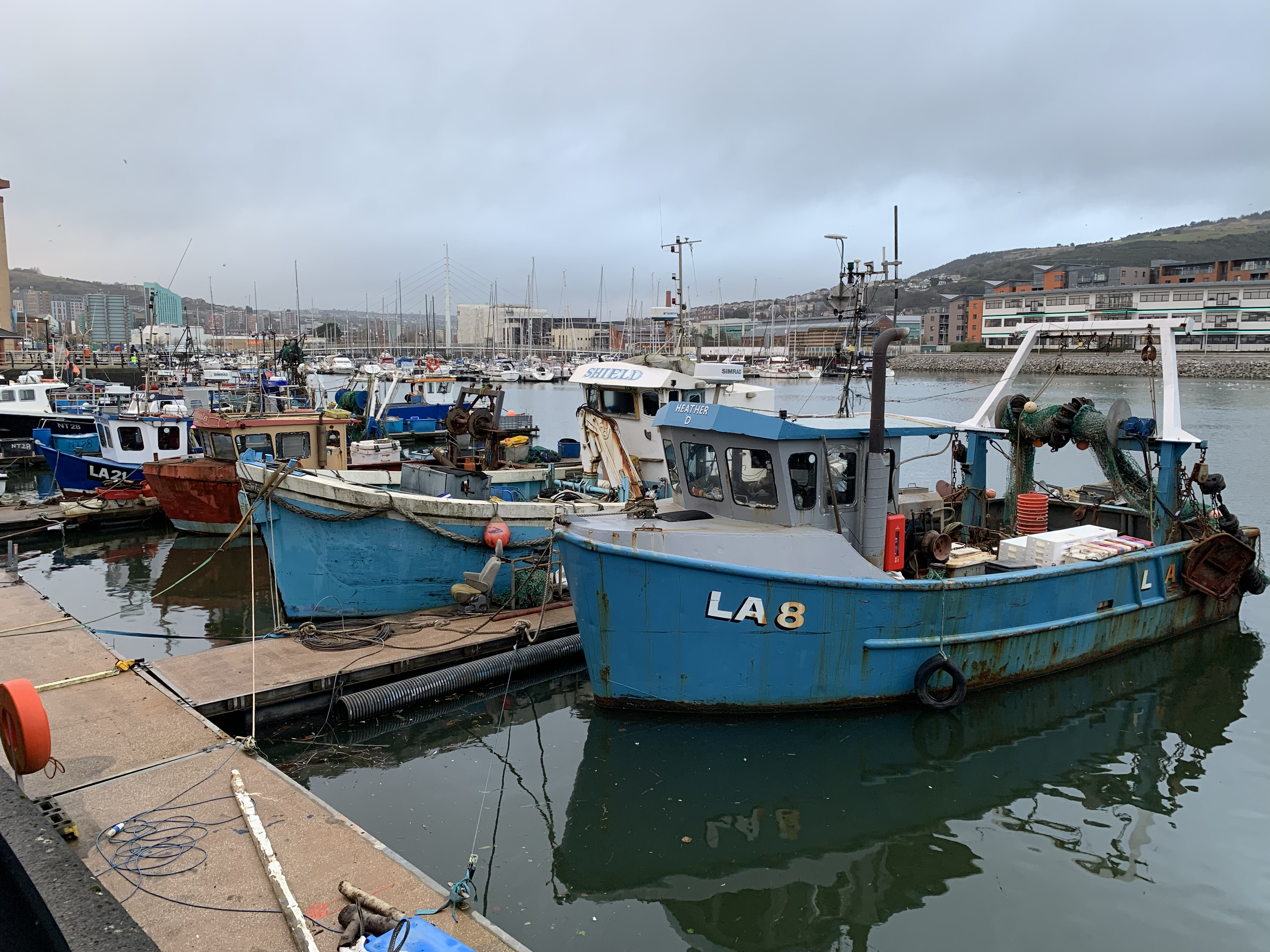
Fishing boats at Swansea Marina

A great variety of fishmongers can be found in Swansea Market including Coakley-Green, which opened in 1856, and was originally at No. 1 Goat Street, Swansea. while Tucker's Fresh and Frozen Seafood has been at Swansea Market for three generations.

== Fruit ==
Gower farms and smallholdings produce soft fruit during the summer. This can be bought at Farmers' markets and can also be picked on the farm. At Scurlage Farm, Penmaen visitors can pick their own strawberries. At Nicholaston Farm, Penmaen, visitors can pick their own raspberries, strawberries, gooseberries and redcurrants. Nicholaston Farm has been in the ownership of the Beynon family for five generations.

== Cakes and desserts ==
Gower fudge is an artisan fudge produced in Penclawdd using locally sourced ingredients including Gwyr Gin. It can be found in shops all across Gower or ordered directly from www.gowerfudge.co.uk.

Maddocks Cakes, run by Anthony and Pat Maddocks, both brought up on Gower, are the main producer of Welsh cakes in Gower. They have opened a tea shop at Southgate, Pennard, which sells hand-made, and bakestone cooked Welsh cakes using local ingredients. These are also available by mail order. Kate Jenkins, of Gower Cottage Brownies, uses fresh Gower free-range eggs in her brownies. These won a True Taste of Wales award in 2007. So Cocoa is the only independent chocolate shop in the area; it is located in Mumbles, in the former house of Captain Dunn. It specialises in gourmet and luxury chocolates, including those made in Wales.

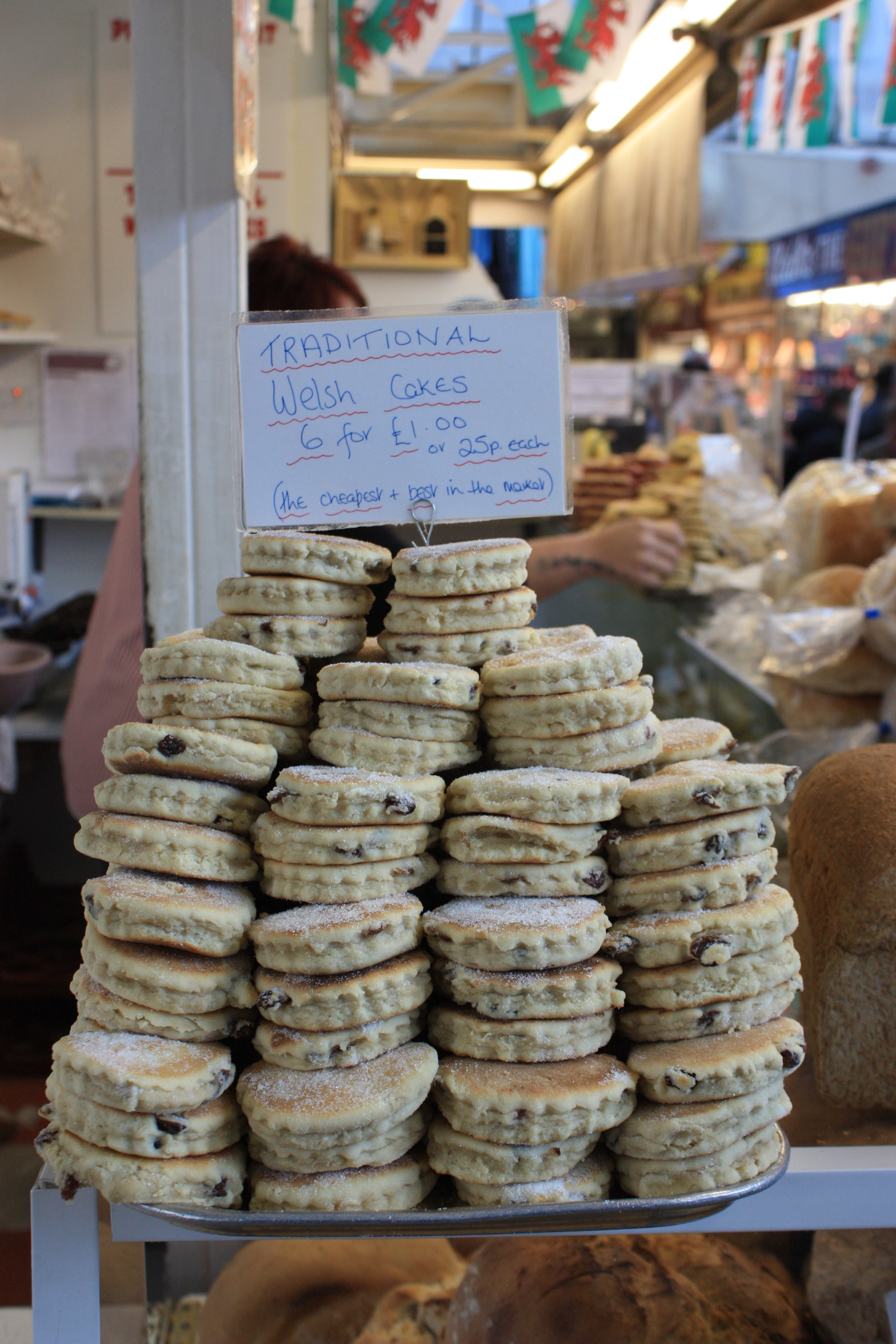
Welsh cakes on sale at Swansea Market

== Farmers' markets and farms ==
Farmers markets can be found at Llangennith (last Saturday of each month, April to September), Loughor (last Friday of each month), Mumbles (second Saturday of each month), Penclawdd (third Saturday of each month), Pennard (second Sunday of each month) and Sketty (first Saturday of each month). Crickton Farm, Llanrhidian has a farm shop selling farm grown vegetables and other produce. and The Gower Wildflower and Local Produce Centre, run by Rachel and David Holland, an ecologist, has a cafe and sells local produce.

== Places to eat ==
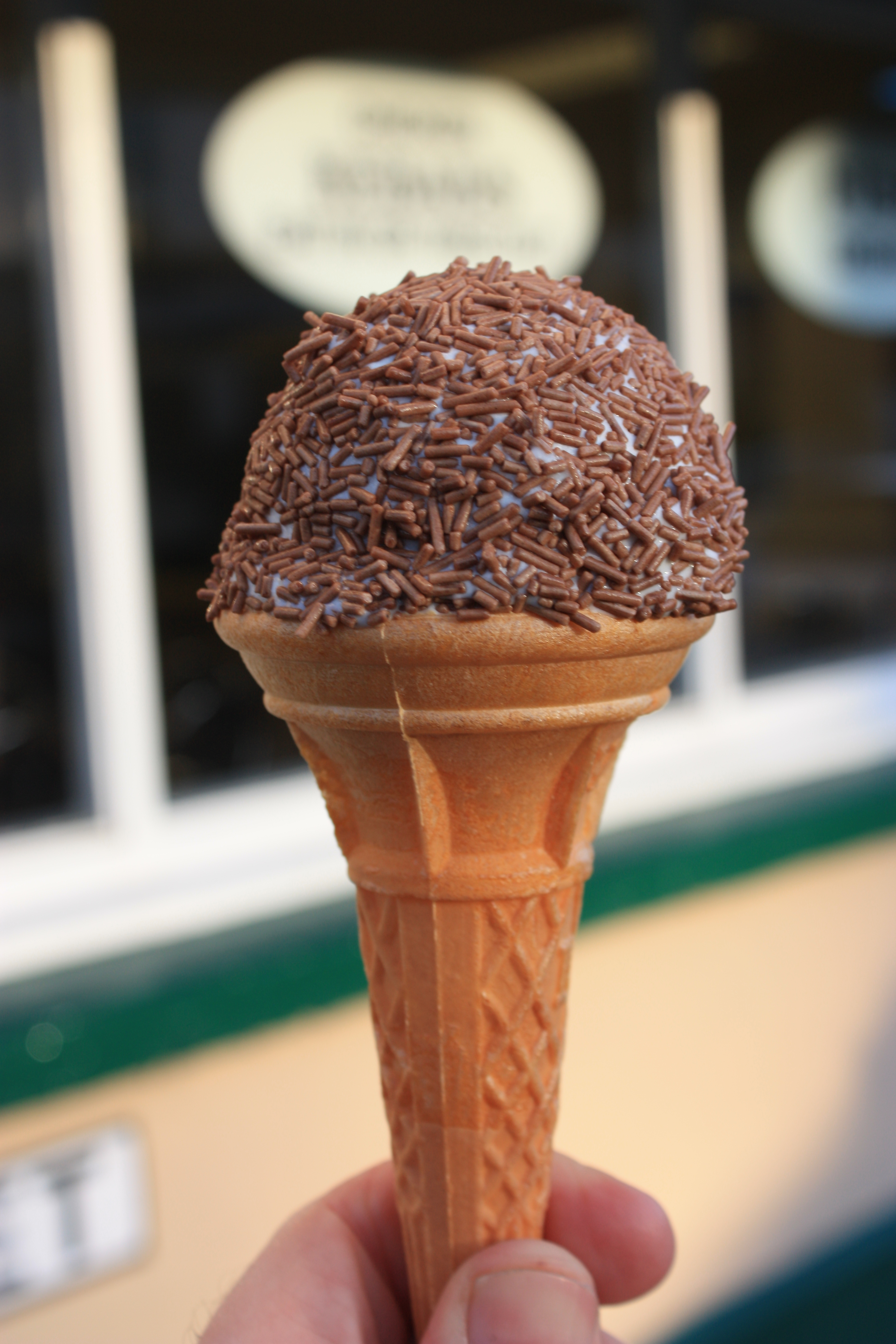
Joe's Ice Cream

The Fairyhill Hotel and Restaurant, near Reynoldston in Gower is a 5-star hotel which became one of Britain's first restaurants to source all its ingredients within a 10-mile radius, being ideally situated in the middle of the Gower's fertile farmlands and close to the sea. The restaurant also uses vegetables from its own walled garden and eggs from its own ducks.

== Local produce strategy ==
Gower and Swansea are the subject of the Rural Swansea Action: Local Food for Local Markets. This project aims to analyse the capacity and needs of local agriculture and food sectors and engage the wider community using the leader approach. The plan is to support the diversification of the rural economy, enhance prosperity at a local level, and develop the area's identity as a high-quality food-producing area able to supply local markets.

In a 2005 survey of 11,000 homes, responses indicated that most Gower residents knew about local produce and said they would be willing to pay a premium for Gower produce. Weekly Gower Farmers' markets, local farm shops and a Gower brand were seen as ways of encouraging sales.

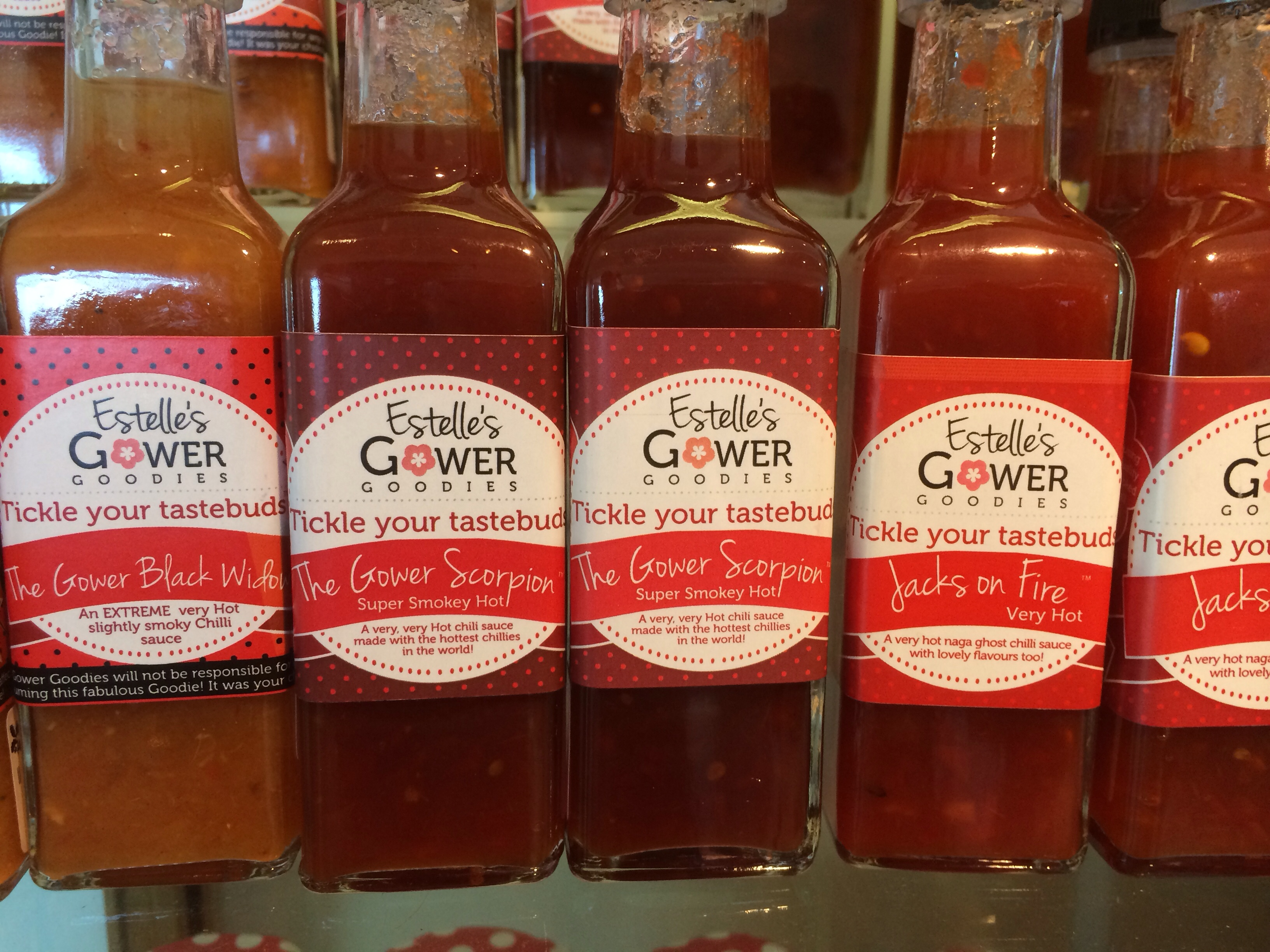
Hot sauces from Estelle's Gower Goodies

== Tradition ==
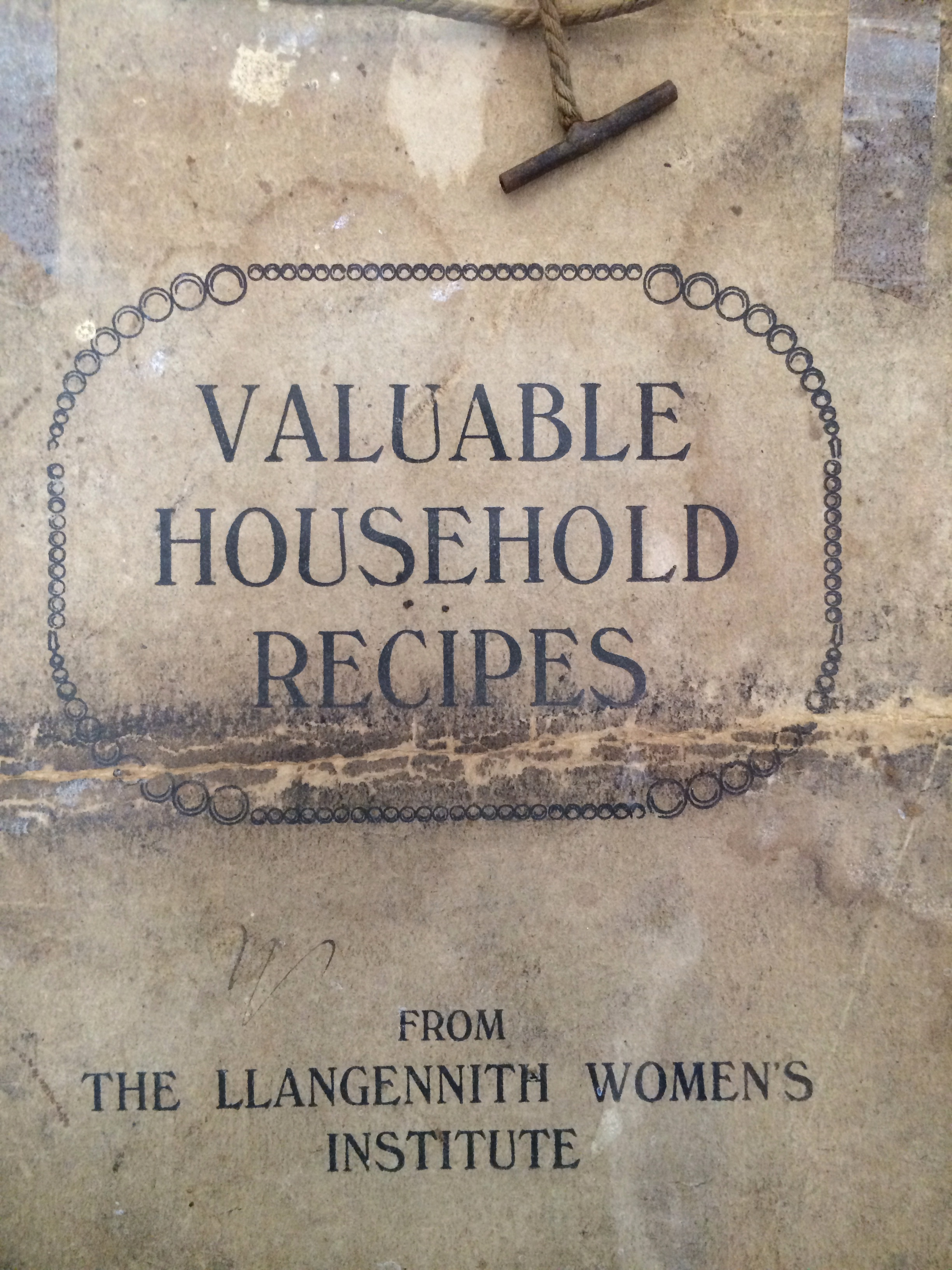
Old recipe book from Llangennith

On Gŵyl Mabsant, or Saint's Day, various Gower villages celebrated their patron saint. Each village had a traditional Mabsant dish. At Llangenydd/Llangennith it was whitepot, a mixture of flour, milk and currants blended together and baked in a brick oven. Whitepot was said to commemorate the milk that flowed from the church bell at St Cenydd's Church, which is known as the Titty Bell. Rhossili's speciality was a kind of plum pudding called a Bonny clobby, and Llanmadog's speciality was a mutton pie made from chopped mutton and currants. The Methodist minister William Griffiths said in 1819 of the Mabsant festivities: 'It was an ungodly gathering and a meeting of the devil for drinking and dancing.'

Traditional Gower weddings were known as Bidding Weddings, because a bidder would sing a formal invitation at the homes of those invited. On the eve of the wedding, relatives would visit and bring gifts of Currant loaves. These were cut into slices and sold at the wedding supper to the young men, who would present them to maidens of their choice. The girls would display their collection of currant slices later in the evening, and the girl with the largest number of slices would be declared the Belle of the Ball. After the wedding, the wedding supper consisted of Tin-meat. This was a traditional dish of mutton placed in a large shallow tin, covered with a layer of pastry, and baked in a brick oven. The guests attending the wedding supper would buy their Tin-meat at the table, one tin costing five shillings and being sufficient for four. No one in the village was forgotten, and Tin-meat portions were distributed to anyone unable to attend.

Souly Day was celebrated on 12 November. On 1 November most Gower wives would bake Souly cakes in readiness for the day (see Allhallowtide). On the evening of 12 November, village youngsters would visit their neighbours and sing:

Souly Souly, Christendom
Every good lady give me some
Give me some or give me none
Give me an answer and I'll be gone

If you haven't got a penny
a ha'penny will do.
If you haven't got a ha'penny
God bless you.

The Souler would be rewarded with a Souly cake, or money. The custom probably derives from All Soul's Day. 12 November originally would have been 1 November, prior to the calendar change made in the eighteenth century.

Until the 1880s, Oystermouth would celebrate 1 September with a Bread and Cheese Fair. By tradition, the oyster skiff owners would treat their crews to bread, cheese and beer, and there would be entertainment: punt races, diving, swimming, and greasy pole competitions. Children would collect oyster shells from visitors buying oysters from stalls on the sea front. They would use the shells to build a grotto, which would be decorated with sea weed and lit from inside with a candle.

Wassailing is a traditional Christmastime drinking ritual and the opening stanzas of the Gower Wassail are as follows;

A-wassail, a-wassail throughout all the town
Our cup it is white and our ale it is brown
Our wassail is made of the good ale and cake (too)
Some nutmeg and ginger, the best you can bake (do)

Our wassail is made of the elderberry bough
And so my good neighbours we'll drink unto thou
Besides all on earth, you have apples in store
Pray let us come in for it's cold by the door

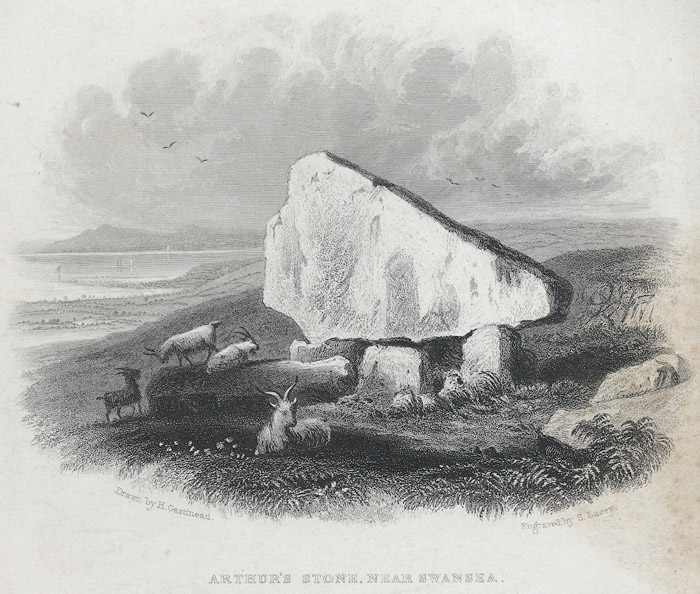
Goats grazing around Arthur's Stone, Cefn Bryn in c 1840, from an engraving by Henry Gastineau, 1791-1876 (from the collection of the National Library of Wales). Goat was eaten in Wales during the nineteenth century and was known as 'hung venison'. Although no longer popular, the antiquarian Thomas Pennant wrote that in Wales 'hung venison' was a source of cheap and plentiful food during the winter months.

== Videos ==
- "Flying the Nest" We Tried Welsh Food in South Wales | Swansea & The Mumbles

== See also ==
- Welsh cuisine
- Cuisine of Carmarthenshire
- Cuisine of Ceredigion
- Cuisine of Monmouthshire
- Cuisine of Pembrokeshire
- Cuisine of Swansea
- Cuisine of the Vale of Glamorgan
