= Colin Pressdee =

Welsh food writer and broadcaster

- Born: Swansea, Wales
- Culinary career
- Cooking style: Welsh cuisine, Cuisine of Gower, British Cuisine
- Television show: See You Sunday

Colin Pressdee is a food writer, broadcaster and consultant living in London.

== Early life ==
Pressdee was brought up in Gower and recalls:

As a child I was fascinated by lobsters, oysters, sea bass and almost anything you could find and eat from the sea. I soon became interested in cooking the produce myself, and what could be a finer meal than fish and shellfish I had caught that day?

I can remember the very cranny where I caught my first crab and lobster; the very rock where I perched and cast for my first bass at Whiteshell; the smell of fresh foods cooking, and the appetite that a day on the seashore gave me. I would scrabble over the rocks for crab and lobster while my father sometimes went out in the boat for bass and mackerel. Someone else would shove a push net across the beach for prawns. We would pick mussels and winkles from the rocks, gather the seaweed laverbread, or search the cliffs for wild mushrooms.

The local farmers exchanged Gower new potatoes and cauliflowers for a few mackerel. At night we might take out the drag net and trawl deep in the dark water for sole, plaice, skate and even squid and cuttlefish. I can remember returning dozens of spider crabs from the lobster pots, not to mention kilos of whelks, conger eels, whiting, mullet, pollock and fiddler crabs, which today are all prized.

Pressdee goes on to recount that the family had a fishing hut at Rhossili where they caught and cooked everything. The fishing hut was "aptly named Kitchen Corner" and was the last point before the causeway to Worms Head:

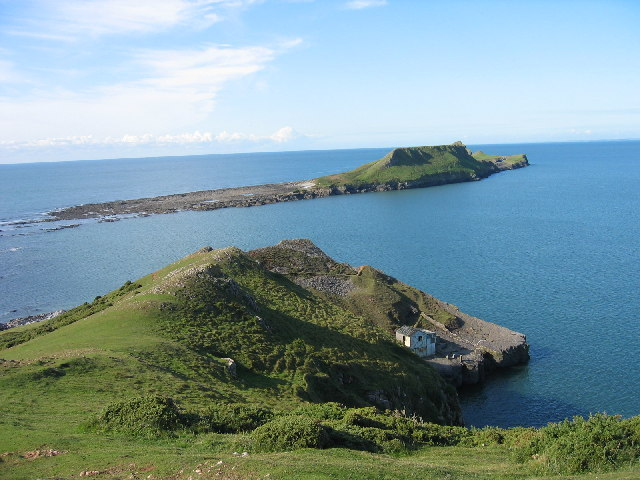
Kitchen Corner, Worm's Head, Rhossili

We would have hut feasts of the catch, cooked on a small Primus stove and a feeble two-burner Calor Gas hob. But what was turned out with such limited facilities was finer than most restaurants would even aspire to.

== Writing ==
Pressdee has written books dealing with Welsh cuisine, the Cuisine of Carmarthenshire and seafood, and through his writing he has shared his expertise and recipes.

His books include London Oyster Guide, Food Wales and Streetwise Cookery.

== Restaurants ==
Pressdee ran two restaurants in Swansea which were probably the first to reference the Cuisine of Gower: The Drangway ('Drangway' being a word from the Gower dialect), which was located near Wind Street and The Oyster Perches, which was located in the Uplands and was named after the perches on which oysters are farmed. Oyster farming was a local industry off the coast of Mumbles in Gower until the early twentieth century (see: Cuisine of Gower).

== Shellfish ==
Pressdee has a particular interest in shellfish and has been a member of the Shellfish Association of Great Britain for over thirty years. He also promoted oysters in his own restaurants and presented programmes on oysters on the show Great Food Live on UKTV. In addition he has written articles on oysters for The Guardian and many other publications.

== Books ==
- Streetwise Cookery (1992) ISBN 0951898817
- Welsh Coastal Cookery (1995) ISBN 0563371366
- Bwyta Allan Yng Nghymru (2004) ISBN 1904824021
- Food Wales: Where to Find, Taste and Buy the Best Local Foods in Wales (2005) ISBN 0954433467
- Taste from Carmarthenshire (2006) ISBN 0906821711
- Food Wales - a second helping (2008) ISBN 1905582153
- Food Wales Eating Out Guide (2009) ISBN 1905582110
- Food Wales Eating Out Guide (2011) ISBN 1905582471
- London Oyster Guide (2011) ISBN 1905582560

== Media ==
Television and radio presentations and appearances include:

- Streetlife, BBC Radio Wales.
- See You Sunday, BBC Cymru Wales.
- Summer Scene, BBC Cymru Wales.
- The Coastline of Wales, BBC Radio Wales, with Keith Floyd and Gary Rhodes.
- Welsh Coastal Cookery, BBC Radio Wales.

== Awards ==
Glenfiddich Award for Regional Writer of the Year (1989) for food and wine articles in Wales on Sunday.

== Articles ==
- The Guardian A Food lover's guide to London, London's best oyster bars
- The Guardian All you need to know about oysters
- The Observer Wales for foodies

== Videos ==
- The Welsh Menu presents Colin Pressdee
