= Cuisine of Carmarthenshire =

Welsh regional cuisine

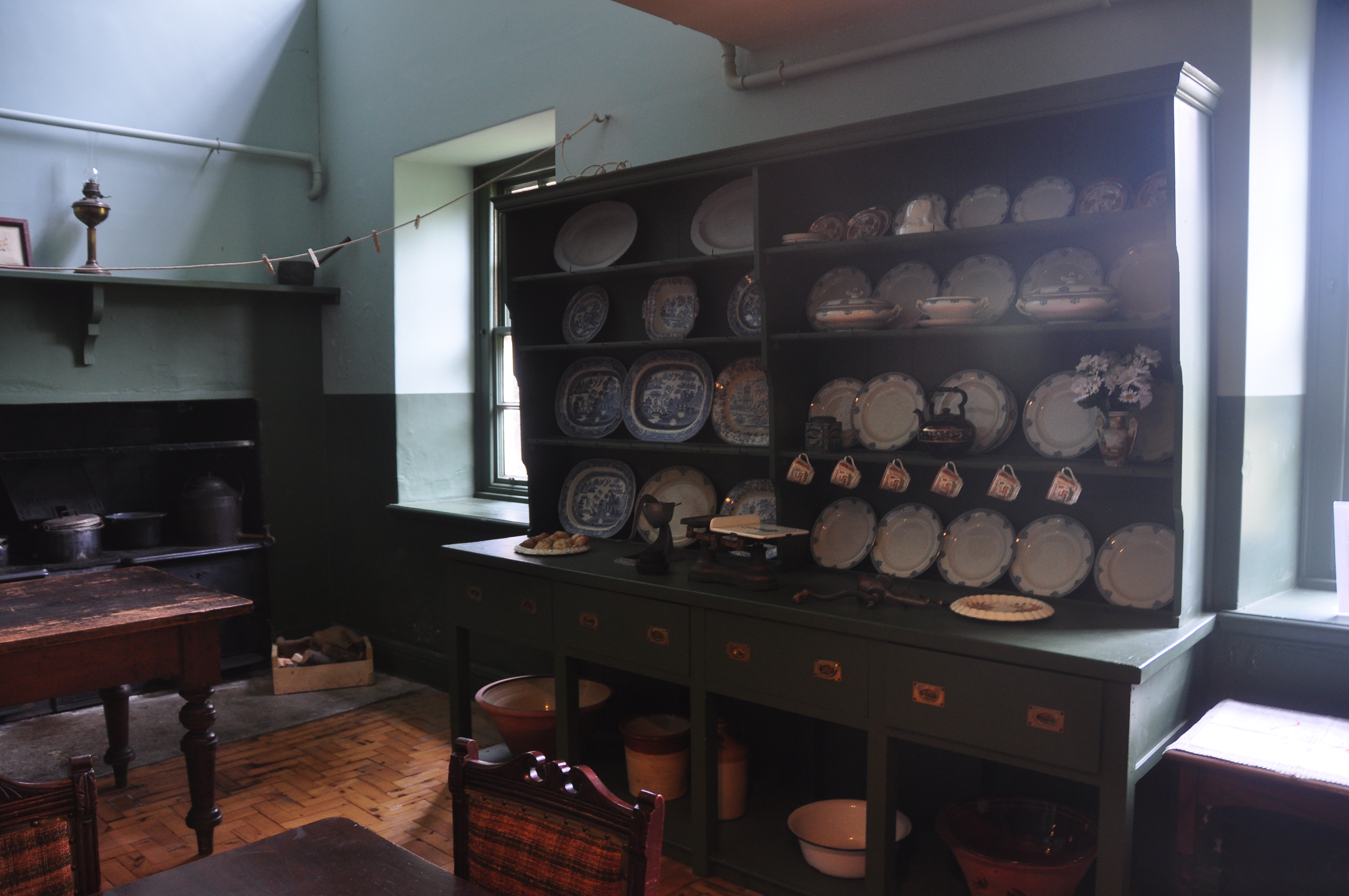
Welsh dresser at Carmarthenshire County Museum

Known as The Garden of Wales, Carmarthenshire is a county of rich, fertile farmland and productive seas and estuaries, that give it a range of foods that motivate many home cooks and restaurateurs. There is a local tradition in brewing, milling, gathering shellfish from the coasts and meat production. Carmarthenshire has been described by The Daily Telegraph as a "worthwhile destination for foodies" with the county having a modest matter of fact excellence. Carmarthenshire has ambitions to become the premier food-producing county of Wales, based on its strong reputation for first-class products. and Carmarthenshire County Council produces its own on-line and hard-copy recipe book called Taste from Carmarthenshire, for those interested in learning more about the county's cuisine.

== Markets ==
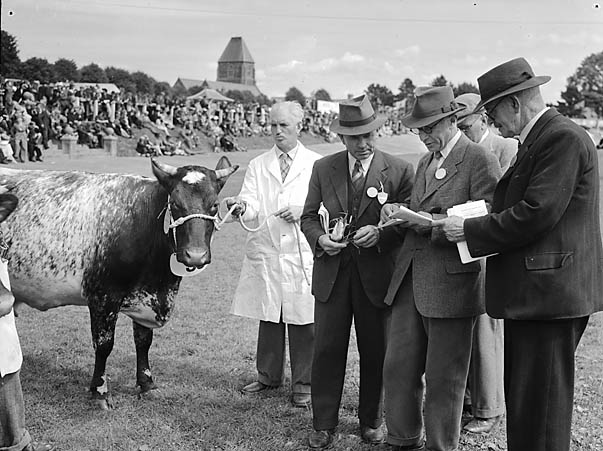
Judges at the Carmarthen Show, 1951, photograph by Geoff Charles, National Library of Wales

Agriculture is an important industry in Carmarthenshire, and most people visit the busy market towns throughout the county. Each market operates a livestock sale on different days. Llanybydder has a normal mart held on Mondays, and a monthly horse sale on the last Thursday of the month. Carmarthen is the county town, and has a full market on Wednesdays and Saturdays, but many stalls are permanent and open every day. The market is important to purchasers of fresh local foods. Carmarthen Market is now at the heart of the £74m St Catherine's Walk redevelopment scheme, which was completed in 2010. Carmarthen has been described as an authentic market town worth a second look. Llanelli market is another busy county market, with more than 50 family run businesses.

The farming year includes agricultural shows held at the showground of the United Counties Agricultural and Hunters Society at Nantyci, near Saron, Carmarthenshire, which often includes exhibits of local produce.

== Meat ==
Carmarthenshire's undulating land is prime dairy and mixed farming country, with lamb and beef both important. In his 1726 pastoral poem "Grongar Hill" the poet John Dyer refers to the valley of the River Towy as follows:

Old castles on the cliffs arise,
Proudly tow’ring in the skies!
Rushing from the woods, the spires
Seem from hence ascending fires!
Half his beams Apollo sheds
On the yellow mountain-heads!
Gilds the fleeces of the flocks:
And glitters on the broken rocks!

Pressdee notes that a number of farms specialise in beef production from a range of British and Continental breeds, with Welsh Black becoming more popular, as in other Welsh regions, over recent years.

Several organic farms have made an impact in the county, including Fferm Tyllwyd located at Felingwm Uchaf, producing organic Welsh Black beef steaks. Welsh Black beef is matured for 21 days at SJ & S Baker, located at Pontyberem. The May Organic Farms at Lampeter offer organic highland beef, Welsh mountain lamb and mutton reared on 100 hectares of conservation land. Welsh Black beef is a speciality of Cig Calon Cymru at Cross Hands, where they have a state-of-the-art butchery linked to their own abattoir and farms. Dewi Roberts of Ffairfach, Llandeilo has his own premium range, which is connected with all the local farmers and draws customers from a wide area, and from internet sales. Another supplier is Cambrian Organics of Llandysul. Ystrad Traditional Organics based in Brechfa, produces lamb, hogget, mutton and beef from some of Britain's rarest breeds and was a True Taste of Wales award winner in 2007.

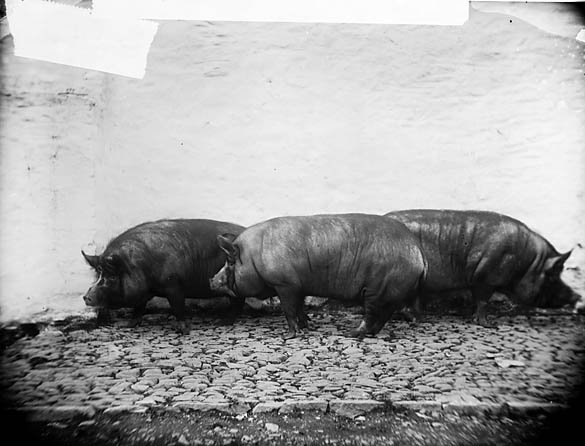
Pigs at Tyn-y-cwm, Llansawel, by John Thomas, c 1885, National Library of Wales

Pigs are part of the mixed farming economy. Traditionally every farm kept a Welsh pig as part of the staple diet. During the winter, the main source of meat was cured ham and bacon from pigs raised on the farm. Hams were cured in the large chimneys of farm kitchens, which slowly dried the ham and bacon after it had been salted. This tradition has largely died out, but the remaining producers make hams which are similar to Bayonne, Serrano, or Parma hams. Freshly cured ham is sliced for grilling, older ham is boiled as a York ham, and ham cured for many months is sliced wafer thin, like Parma ham. Carmarthen ham has a similar farmyard flavour. The hocks have the greatest flavour, and need to be boiled a long time to soften the meat. They make a good base for winter stew, or a summer ‘paysanne’ salad. Dry-cured Carmarthen Ham can be found at Carmarthen Market. Six generations of the Rees family have sold ham here spanning 200 years. and their family were the first commercial producers of dry-cured ham in Britain. Carmarthen Ham is dry salt-cured and then air dried and sold whole boneless, or sliced thinly and vacuum packed. It is believed that when the Romans settled in Carmarthen they acquired the recipe and on their return to Italy called it Parma Ham. The ham is cut in thin wafers and is served like prosciutto or Parma ham, but is saltier. Carmarthen Ham production remains a cottage industry, in order to keep it a premium product. Carmarthen Ham is a particular favourite of King Charles III. The Rees family also produce a short back and streaky bacon. This is dry-cured for one week and hung for a further three weeks. It is recommended that the bacon is blanched before frying to remove any excess salt. The Rees family have more than 80 hams curing at any one time, and it takes nine months to cure they also have a mail order business and travel to the nearby markets of Brecon, Fishguard, Haverfordwest, Pembroke and Cardigan.

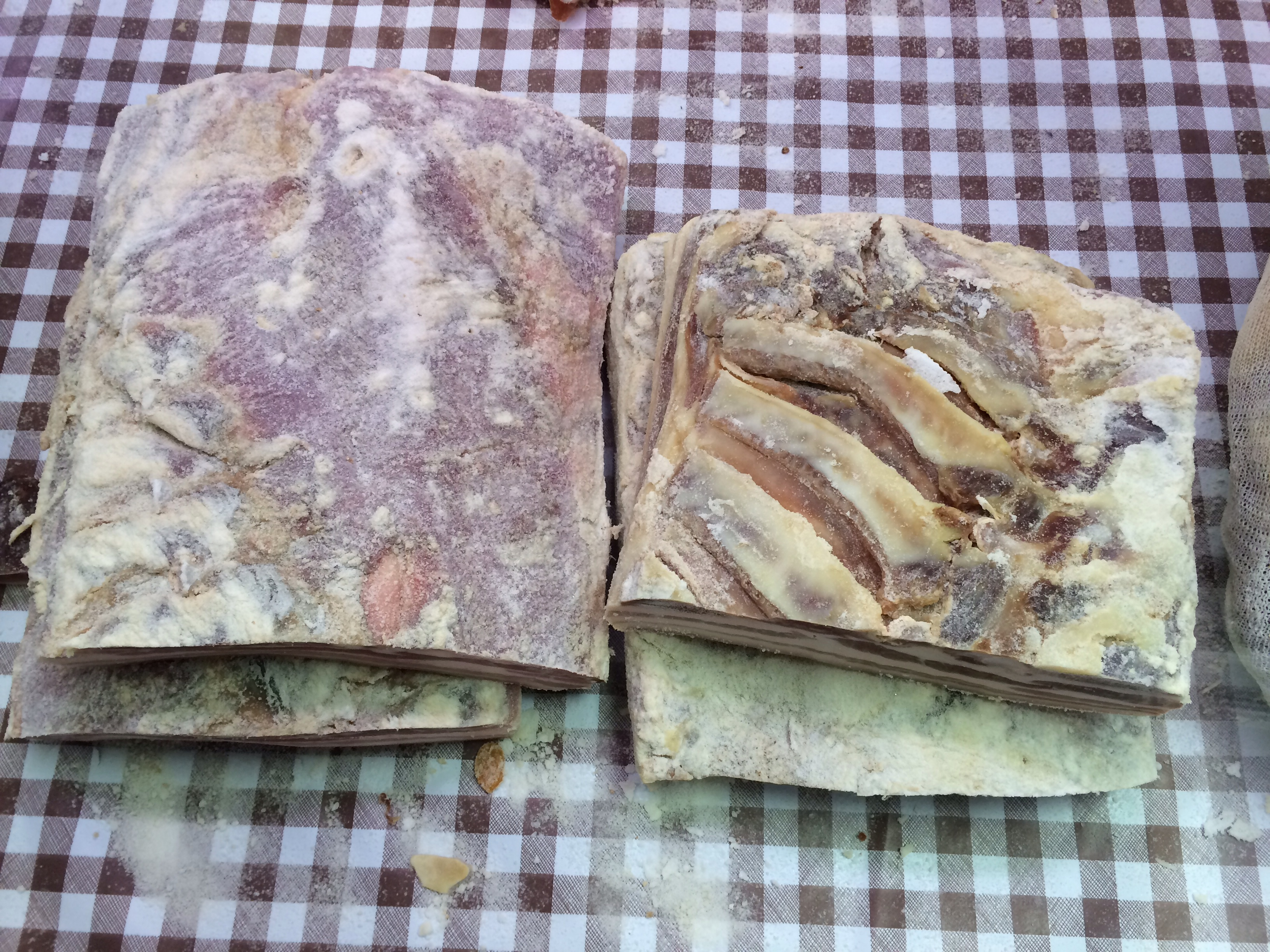
Carmarthen Ham

Recipes for Carmarthen ham include: Country Ham with Vegetable Stew; Pancakes stuffed with Carmarthen Ham and Wild Mushrooms with a Savoury Custard; Salad Paysanne with Carmarthen Ham and Lentils, and Carmarthen Ham in Beer Carmarthenshire Ham has featured on Rick Stein's Food Heroes The Welsh chef Dudley recommends the recipe Pork Wrapped in Carmarthenshire Ham At the Royal Welsh Show 2010, Carmarthenshire Ham was included in the new European Protected Food names initiative for Protective Geographical Indication (PGI) status, which would give European Union legal status to Carmarthenshire Ham.

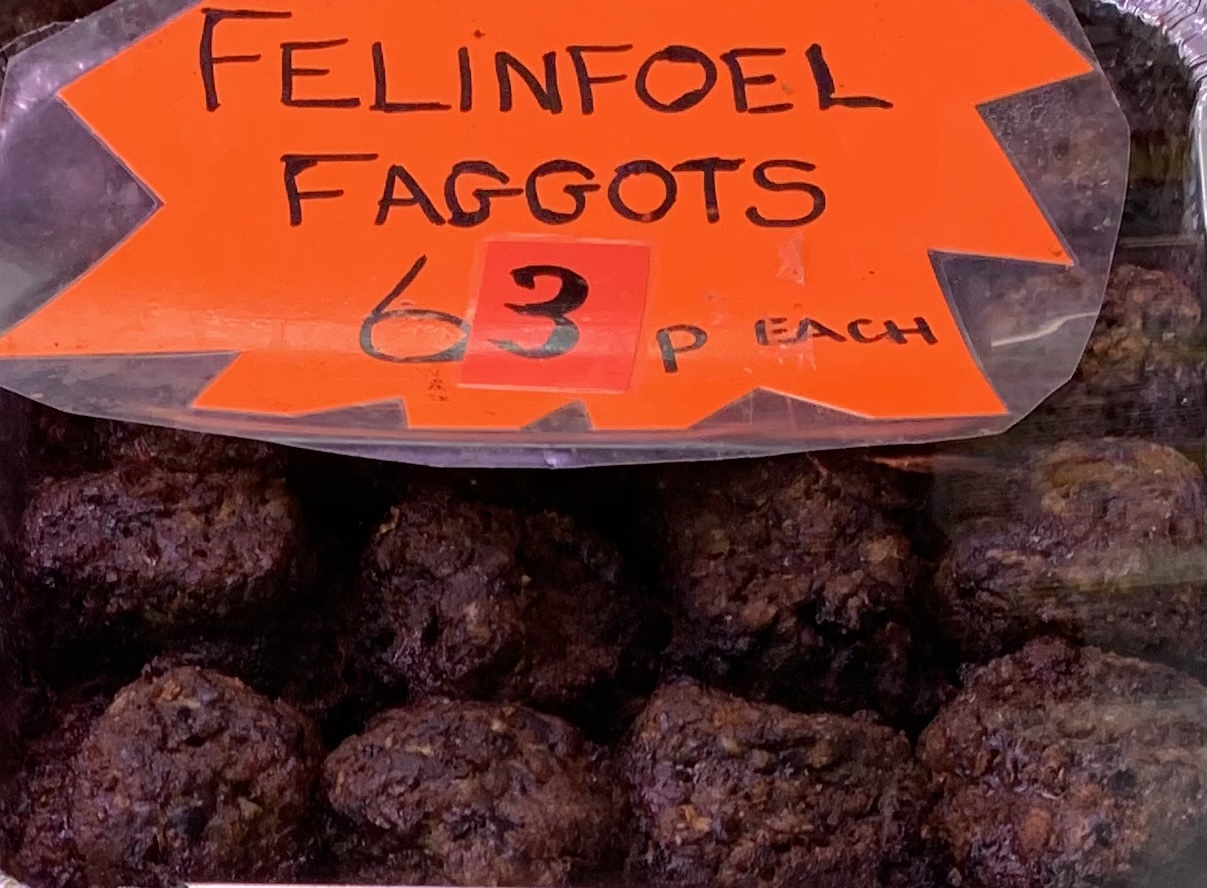
Felinfoel Faggots

Carmarthen Market also sells home-made brawn, sausages, pork pies, and faggots. Faggots can be bought at Ettie Richardson's Home Baking stall, which sells them fresh every Wednesday, Friday and Saturday. A & G Williams of Felinfoel produce traditional Welsh faggots and other savoury products. Brawn is a traditional Carmarthenshire dish, and one Carmarthenshire recipe includes pig's head and trotters which are rubbed well with salt and then placed in a crock and left for 2 or 3 days. The meat is then washed in cold water, placed in a boiler pan, brought to the boil and then simmered for 3–4 hours until the meat leaves the bone. The meat is then minced with onions, sage and pepper and then, the liquor strained, and then the mixture simmered for about 15 minutes and then left to cool.

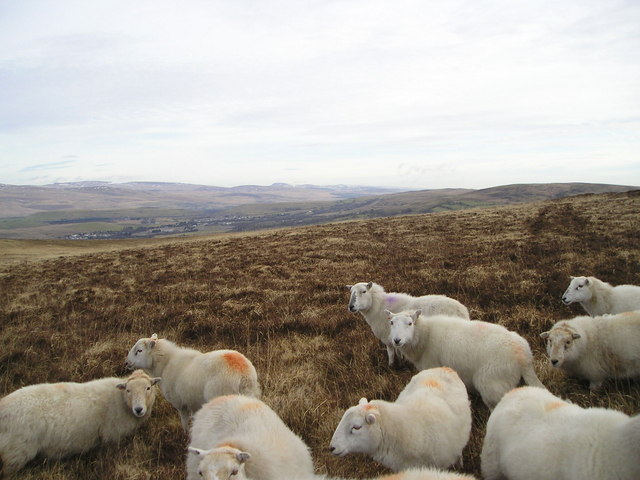
Welsh Mountain Sheep on moorland at Cwmhelen, with Brynamman and the valley of the River Amman in the background (photo by Marion Phillips)

Fets y Cybydd, or the Miser's Feast, was a very popular dish in Carmarthenshire 100 years ago. It was made in a saucepan, but can also be made in a casserole. The bottom of the dish is covered in peeled potatoes, and a sliced onion, with a little salt, covered with water and then brought to the boil. When the water is boiling, a few slices of bacon or a piece of ham are placed on top. The lid is replaced and the whole simmered until the potatoes are cooked, and the water absorbed. The miser was supposed to eat the potatoes one day, mashed up in the liquid, keeping the slices of bacon to be eaten out the next day with plain boiled potatoes.

The poet Lynette Roberts, who spent her final years from 1989 in Ferryside and is buried in the churchyard in Llanybri, wrote about making cawl in her Poem from Llanybri (1946), as follows:

In the village when you come. At noon-day
I will offer you a choice bowl of cawl
Served with a 'lover's' spoon and a chopped spray
Of leeks or savori fach...

Gilli Davies notes that:

..it is not so long ago that almost every meal in rural Wales included cawl in some form or other. Fresh herbs, often winter savory, was grown near the back door so that it could easily be picked and added to the cawl. Only salted meat would have been available, and oatmeal, mixed with a little water and stirred in, was added to the cawl to make it go further. Sometimes cooked oatcakes were crushed and added to a bowl of cawl that had been reheated three or four times, and served at breakfast time. In cold weather cawl would be followed by apple or plain dumplings, made by mixing flour with a spoonful of cawl to make a thick paste. The paste was then spread around an unskinned apple and left to simmer on top of the soup.

The Marketing and Tourism department of Carmarthenshire County Council has developed a Cawl Crawl, this is a themed route that people can follow and includes establishments in Carmarthenshire that make their own individual variations on the traditional cawl dish.

== Fish ==
Carmarthen Bay sweeps from Gower to Tenby and is the delta for the Carmarthenshire rivers which have excellent fishing: the rivers Towy, Teifi, Afon Cothi and Taf. The ancient craft of coracle fishing can still be seen on the river Teifi, especially between Cenarth and Cilgerran, and on the river Towy near Carmarthen.

Sewin is known as the prince of Welsh fish. They feed more locally than salmon and hence are more distinctive from region to region, with a pale, pinky flesh and a high oil content. The season begins around Easter and ends in the summer, with the largest fish having the earliest run up the rivers. Sewin range in size from less than a pound in weight to 3 lbs, known as shiglin (the smallest) and twlpin (the larger) in late July and August, to fully grown fish known as gwencin, which equal a salmon in size and come in May or June (or earlier), and again in September. Large sewin can be distinguished from salmon by the tail: the tail is more deeply indented, the colour is browny-grey instead of blue-grey, and the body is slimmer near the tail. Welsh anglers claim that the Tywi yields more sewin over 10 lbs than every sea-trout river in England and Scotland put together.

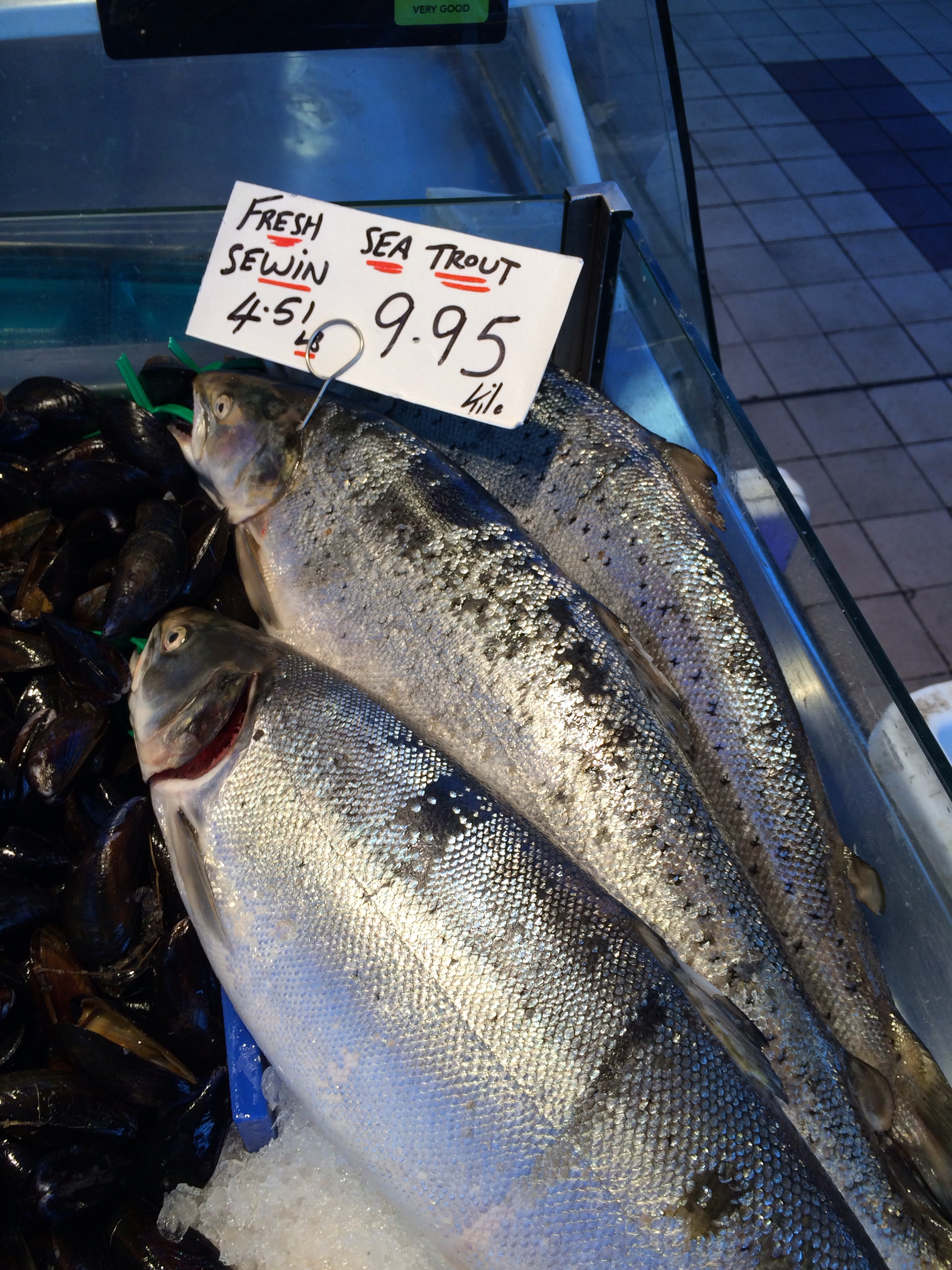
Sea trout (Sewin) caught by coracle in Carmarthenshire and on sale at Swansea Market.

Raymond Rees, at Carmarthen Market, has iced fish slabs with fresh fish from the coast and the Towy river. He specialises in sewin. He also has one of the few licenses to fish with a coracle on the Towy. This is the longest river entirely within the county. Sewin has a more delicate flavour than salmon and is best cooked simply: grilled or baked gently with plenty of salty Welsh butter. The butter on the hot flesh brings out the flavour, and the rough texture of locally baked brown bread contrasts well with the smooth flesh of sewin. To tell if a whole sewin is of good flavour, the colour of the flesh should be examined by requesting the fishmonger to make a tiny incision with a knifepoint in the middle of the back of the fish. The flesh should be a clear pink, not a pale or fawny pink, which suggests that the fish has been in the river too long. Big sewin can grow out of their taste and become flavourless, these fish are better stuffed. If a sauce is used, then fennel is the best herb to add, and grows wild along the west coast of Wales; an alternative is a cucumber sauce or samphire which grows on the Loughor estuary.

== Sea food ==
Mussels are gathered by hand from Carmarthen Bay and are best in the winter time, when there is an ‘R’ in the month. September to April is the traditional mussel (and oyster) season. Cockles are gathered in the Burry Inlet, but mainly on the Gower side (see Cuisine of Gower). However, Les Parsons, a native Laugharne, started his own shellfish business on the Carmarthenshire side of the estuary after returning home from military service in India in 1947. This was around the time that Dylan Thomas was resident, and writing about the web-footed cocklewomen of Laugharne. Les Parson experimented with bottling cockles in vinegar, to enable them to be sold further afield, and established Parson's Pickles. The firm uses Laugharne Castle as part of its corporate identity because the original factory was located in a mill close to the castle. The company now operates out of Burry Port and produces cockles, mussels, shellfish and pickles, to traditional recipes and European Union accreditation standards.

== Vegetables and fruit ==
Vegetables and fruit are grown in gardens and alltoments and Lynette Roberts describes the Carmarthenshire cottage garden as follows:

"In most gardens here two-thirds are taken up with potato seed, with a row shovelled up for broad beans, cabbage and parsley, and a small finer bed about 3ft by 4ft containing lettuce, carrot, leeks, shallots, beetroot and perhaps a little cress and radish. This makes a cottager independent as he seldom requires any other choice of vegetable."

In Under Milk Wood, Dylan Thomas writes about Mary Ann the Sailors and her cottage garden as follows, comparing it with the Garden of Eden:

"The Garden of Eden.

She comes in her smock-frock and clogs

Away from the cool scrubbed cobbled kitchen with the Sunday-school pictures on the whitewashed wall and the farmers' almanac hung above the settle and the sides of bacon on the ceiling hooks, and goes down the cockleshelled paths of that applepie kitchen garden, ducking under the gippo's clothespegs, catching her apron on the blackcurrant bushes, past beanrows and onion-bed and tomatoes ripening on the wall towards the old man playing the harmonium in the orchard, and sits down on the grass at his side and shells the green peas that grow up through the lap of her frock that brushes the dew."

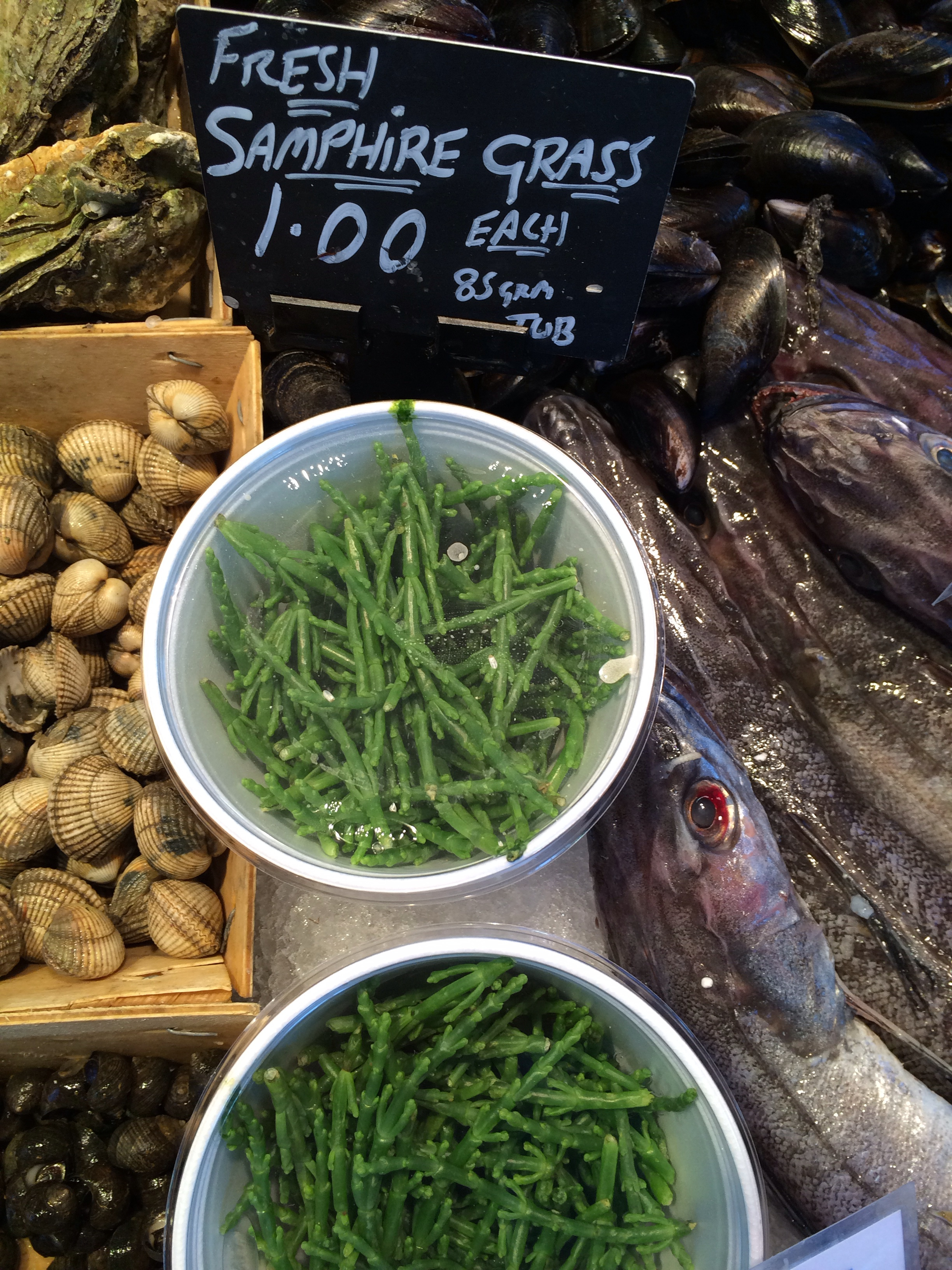
Fresh samphire from the Loughor estuary for sale at Swansea Market

In describing the walled garden at Heolddu, Margaret Evans recalled that the cottage garden was once considered to be a 'chemist shop" with vegetables, greens and fruit grown to keep the family healthy. Vegetables that could be stored and eaten during the winter included leeks, parsley, cabbage, swedes, carrots, parsnips, potatoes, and nuts.

Walled kitchen gardens were usually constructed for larger Carmarthenshire houses and here fruit, flowers and vegetables would be grown. The walls gave privacy and protected the plants from the frost and often included greenhouses for tender plants. In Carmarthenshire most of these gardens date from the nineteenth century and were stocked with plants bought as seeds from English seed catalogues. Orders would be delivered by train or mail coach. In this way popular English cultivars of fruit and vegetables were introduced into the county. However, by the 1800s Carmarthenshire had its own plant nurseries. After World War I, most of these gardens were abandoned but Aberglasney and Middleton (at the National Botanic Garden of Wales), have been rescued and replanted and are now open to the public, with plans to do the same with the garden at Abergwili.

Families without a garden would often grow fruit and vegetables on an allotment. Holland notes that the allotment movement began as a means of feeding the poor and reducing the poor rate in agricultural districts, but that today they are a means of improving mental and physical health. He notes that this century they have become popular as a result of the organic movement. The National Trust created 60 allotments in Llandeilo in 2009, and community allotments were opened at Llannon in 2012. In 2011, Carmarthenshire County Council Policy & Resources Scrutiny Committee noted that concerns regarding food origin and quality, coupled with the current financial pressures, are some of the main causes for increasing demand for allotments and that the council wished to identify suitable plots of land for new allotments.

Garden vegetables would be used to make cawl, this would be made with just vegetables or meat would be added. In Carmarthenshire, a vegetable cawl is called Cawl pen lletwad, and this was usually prepared when meat was in short supply. Tibbott has a note of such a cawl from Cwm-bach. Sometimes a cawl would need to be prepared quickly, and in this case the vegetables (and meat if added) would be cut into small pieces and boiled together. This type of cawl is known as Cawl ffwt a berw and Tibbott records such a recipe from Trelech.

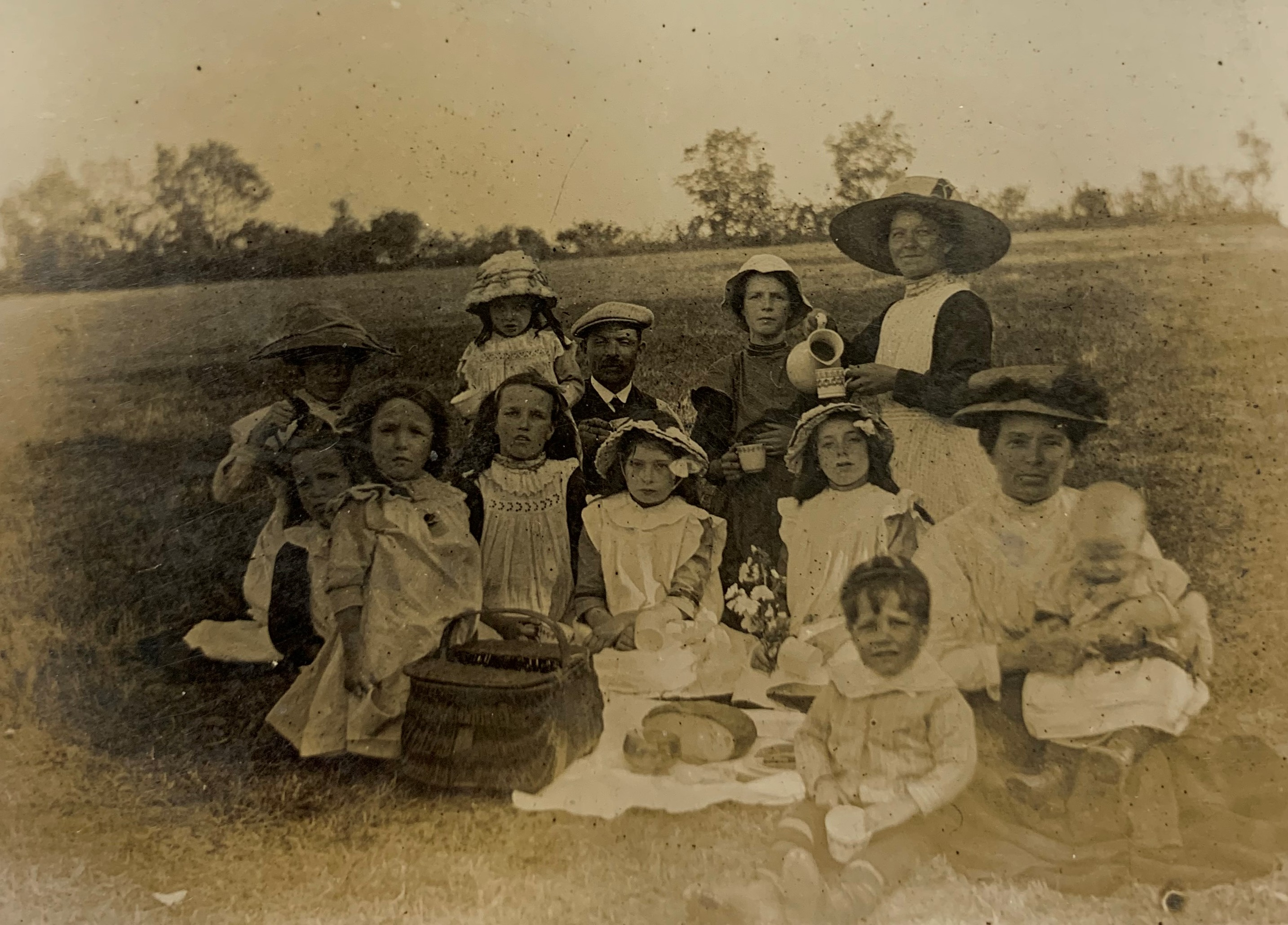
Picnic at Efailwen, Carmarthenshire

Potatoes were a staple garden vegetable and would be roasted or boiled. One example of a potato dish which Tibbott has recorded is called Cig ar wyneb tato, this is a dish of roast potatoes (Tato Rhost) where the potatoes are part boiled in a heavy saucepan and then covered with bacon rashers, with a thick layer of chopped onions or chives placed on top. The pan is covered with a closely fitting lid and cooked with a little water for half an hour, so that the bacon fat browns the potatoes at the bottom of the pan. On churning day the dish would be served with buttermilk (Tato rhost a llaeth enwyn). The meal is cooked without the need for much supervision and was usually made in a ffwrn fach over an open fire.

=== Apples ===
Apples were an important food source for local people and this can be seen in the many farms in the county that include the word perllan (orchard) or afallen (apple tree) in the name of the farm. In the book Hen Dŷ Fferm (The Old Farmhouse) (1961) the author, D J Williams, mentions three varieties of apple grown locally at that time: Afal Vicar, Afal Bwen Bach and Marged Niclas, with only Marged Niclas having been rediscovered. At Maesquarre, John Lewis Williams (1853–1919) grew two varieties which have since been lost: an oblong apple known as Twil Dyn Gwydd (Gander's Backside) and Afal Melys Bach ("Small Sweet Apple"). Another lost variety is Pren Miles, which is referred to in a 20th century notebook from Llandeilo. Large estates would buy seed from catalogues produced by English nurseries and would therefore plant standard English varieties; but the smaller land holders would plant varieties of traditional Welsh apples. When an imported variety failed, usually due to the wetter Welsh climate, a local variety would be substituted instead. Paul Davies, of Dolauhirion nursery near Llandeilo, who helped rescue Welsh apple varieties, refers to a large orchard of 100 trees near Llanwrda planted in the 1920s from English types, but where a more hardy local variety, known as Marged Niclas, had been substituted in place of failed imported varieties. He notes that the benefit of Welsh apple varieties is that they can be planted directly into the ground without the need for grafting (known as burrknot). Morgan Nicholas was a popular apple variety that could be stored and eaten until May when the gooseberry crop was available for pie making. Other apple varieties from Carmarthenshire include Glansevin, Talgarth, Gelli Aur and Tinyrwydd. The National Botanic Garden of Wales has established an orchard of native apple trees and on 21 November 2017 was awarded National Plant Collection status for its orchard of Welsh varieties. Graves notes that John Speed's map of Carmarthen shows the town walls filled with orchards, while a 1905 map of the Tywi valley shows 150 separate orchards between Llandeilo and Llandovery. Davies recounts that one local lady would be taken by her mother to the Tywi valley every spring to see the valley which would be white with apple blossom. Apples were also used for medicinal purposes, with the Physicians of Myddfai prescribing them for ague (intermittent fever), jaundice, and eye water. The orchards at Dryslwyn Castle were well enough known to be recited in a poem by Lewis Glyn Cothi:

Iddaw fo mae neuadd falch
Ac yn wengaer gan wyngalch,
Ac o gylch ogylch i hon,
Naw o arddau yn wyrddion,
Perllanwydd a gwinwydd gwyr,
Derw ieuainc hyd yr awyr.

He holds a proud hall
And a white fort, whitewashed
And all around
Nine gardens green
Great orchards and vines
Young oaks touching the sky

== Cheese ==
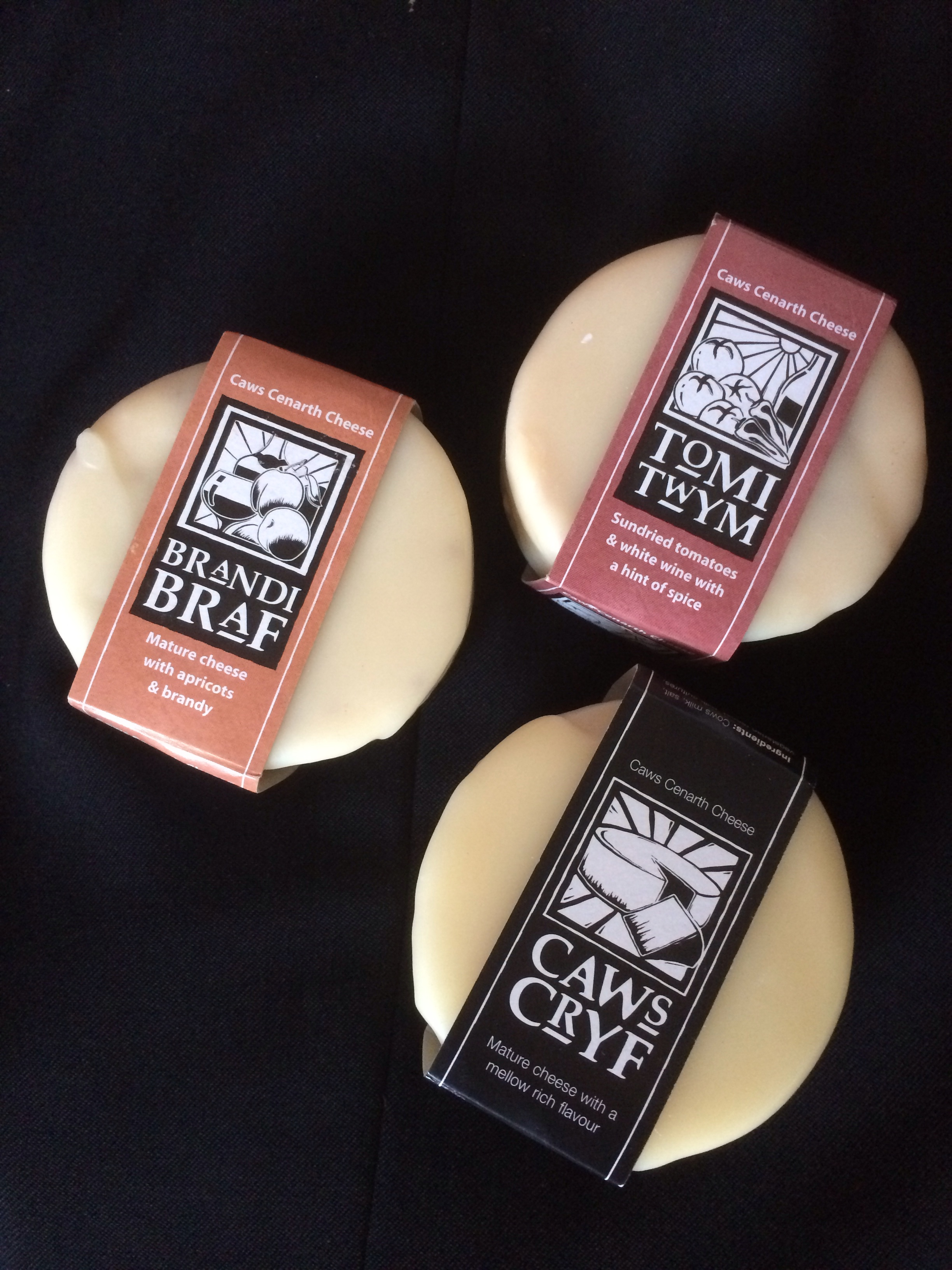
Caws Cenarth cheeses

The Farmhouse Cheese Shop, run by John and Patrice Savage-Ontswedder, can be found in Carmarthen Market. They have their own range of Teifi Cheeses and Glynhynod Caerphilly, together with almost all the other cheeses made in West Wales.

Teifi Cheese is an organic vegetarian cow's milk cheese with a bright yellow interior and sweet fruity flavour when young. As it ages, the cheese becomes hard and flaky. It is similar to Gouda cheese and can be eaten on its own, or used in recipes where it adds richness and depth. The flavour is influenced by the grasses growing in the Teifi valley.

Savage-Ontswedder also produce Celtic Promise, a modern vegetarian surface-ripened cow's milk cheese with a semi-soft texture and a moist orange-red rind with a dusting of mould. It is washed in cider brine during ripening and is creamy, rich and yellow with a pungent aroma and piquant taste. This cheese, together with another of their cheeses, known as Saval have been champions at the British Cheese Awards. Celtic Promise complements cider, ale and medium-bodied wines.

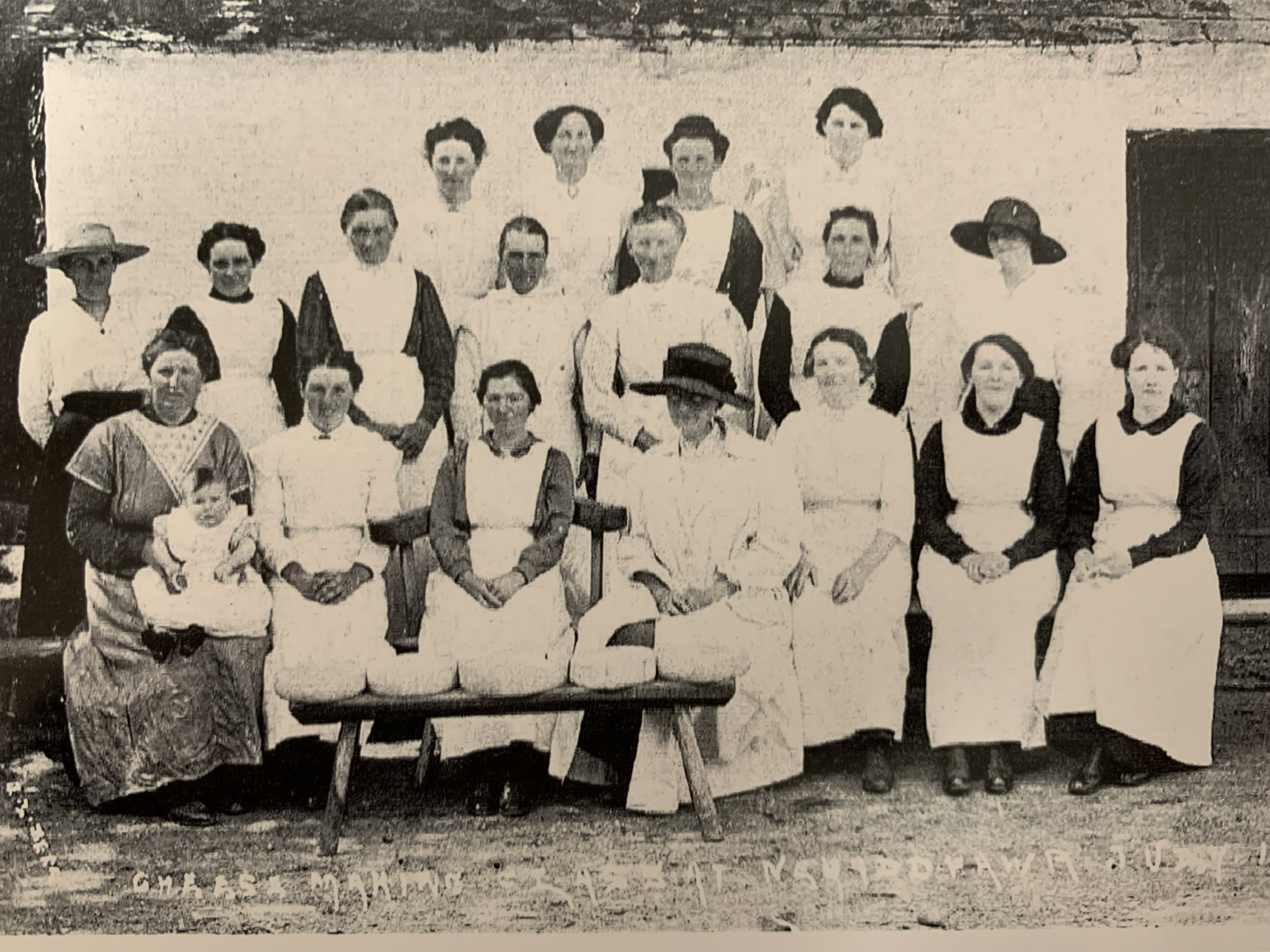
Photograph of a cheese making class at Neuadd Fawr, Carmarthenshire, 1917

Llanboidy Cheese was made on an organic farm near Llanboidy, it was the only cheese in Europe made from the milk of Red Poll cows, a rare pedigree breed grazing traditional pastures and drinking from the farm well. This gave the cheese a fresh-cut hay aroma and sharp, grassy tang. It was made by hand and allowed to develop and mature in its own rind. It had a smooth, silky texture and robust taste.

Other Carmarthenshire cheeses include Caws Cenarth and Kid Me Not, both winners of prizes at the British Cheese Awards. Caws Cenarth supplies Perl Las blue organic cheese to England's Twickenham rugby stadium and has also supplied British Airways.

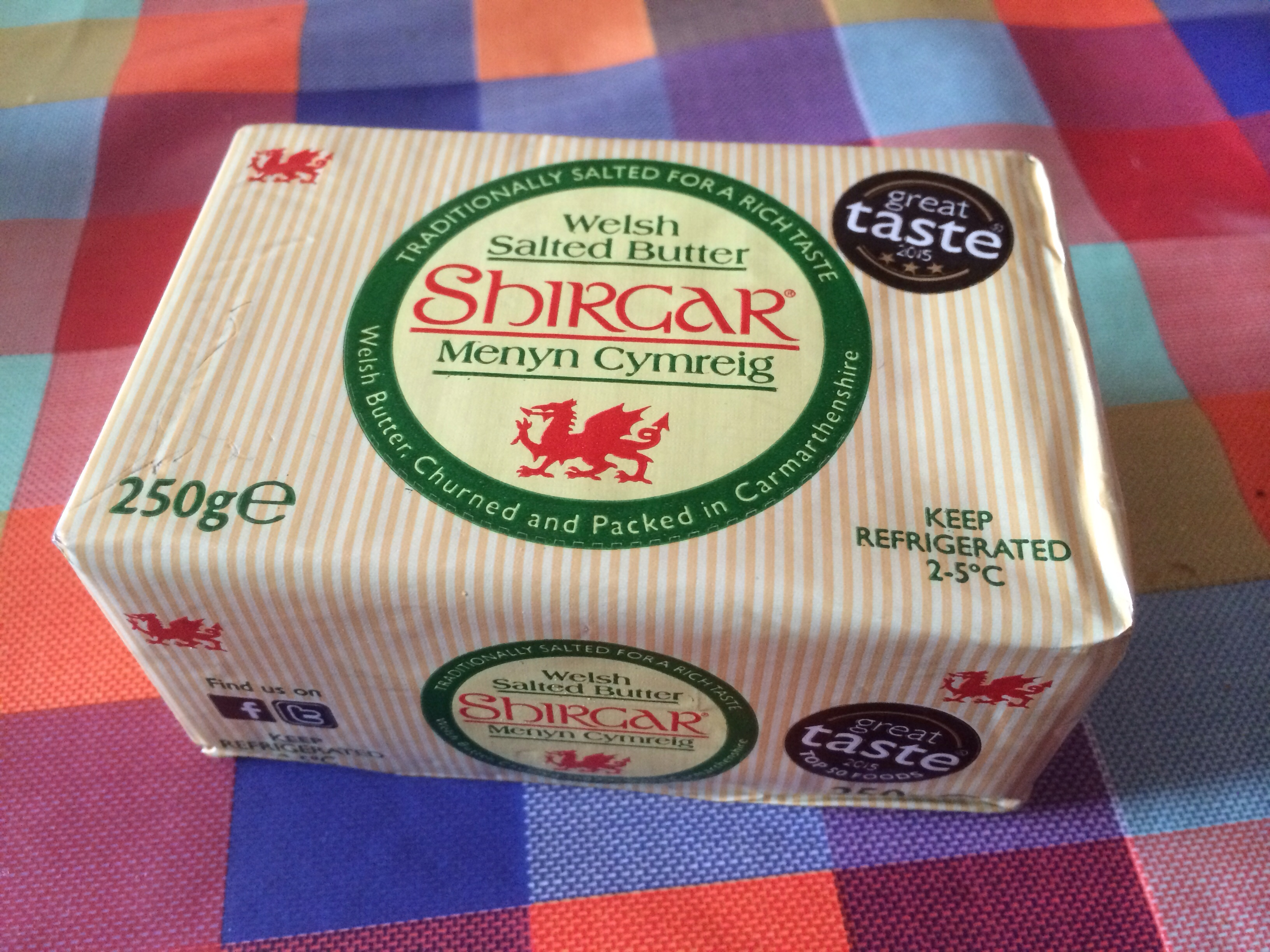
Shirgar, Menyn Cymreig

== Condiments ==
Kite Wholefoods, of Pontyberem, are artisan producers of organic mayonnaise. Pencae Mawr Farm Foods of Llanfynydd, Carmarthen, produce home-made chutneys, preserves and other condiments and are True Taste Award winners winning a gold medal for best organic product (beetroot relish) and a silver award for speciality product (blackcurrant and vanilla). Cakes and sweets

Popty Bach-y-Wlad which means little baker in the countryside is a traditional bakery run by Enfys Marks at Carmarthen Market, baking Welsh cakes, bara brith, teisen lap (the Welsh plate cake), boiled cake and a range of assorted breads, cakes and buns. At Pobdy Stephens Bakehouse, also art Carmarthen Market, can be found Welsh cakes, sultana pancakes, chunky pasties and Victoria sponges.

The Richardson family of Llansteffan have a shop in Carmarthen Market selling Etta's Royal Cake. The family firm was set up in the 1970s by Etta Richardson Etta's Royal Cake is a favourite of the Prince of Wales, eight cakes were delivered to Highgrove one Christmas, and the cake was ordered by Queen Elizabeth II for the wedding reception of Prince Charles and Camilla. Fiona's Fudge, in Carmarthen, produces home-made fruit cakes and fudge. In Llandovery, organic fudge, biscuits and cakes are made by Just So Scrumpitious/O Mor Braf without using preservatives and gift packaged.

Mario's Ice Cream, produced by Mario Dalavalle, a third generation ice-cream maker, was awarded the National Ice Alliance Silver Shield in 2007 for the best dairy ice cream in Great Britain. He produces 30 varieties of ice cream at his dairy in Crosshands. All the milk comes from a 15-mile radius of his dairy, including the Nant-y-Bwla pedigree Jersey herd, and the Gwendraeth Valley's Cwmheidir Farm, gold medal winners at the Royal Welsh Show. Mario points out that cheap ice cream is full of air and vegetable fat, he believes the reason that his business has grown is because people are willing to pay more for quality. Mario's Ice Cream is available across Wales and at Asda stores. Another national ice cream award winner is Frank's Ice Cream produced for the last 80 years from Capel Hendre, Ammanford, it is available from Tescos and has won the British, European and Champion of Champions’ cup. and produces a diabetic vanilla ice cream Tregroes Waffle Bakery, of Llandysul, produces sweet waffles based on traditional recipes.

Brynderi Honey Farm, of Whitland, are honey producers and international organic honey packers from farm produced honey to honey harvested from organic-certified hives. They also produce honey ice-cream and marmalade.

== Alcoholic drink ==
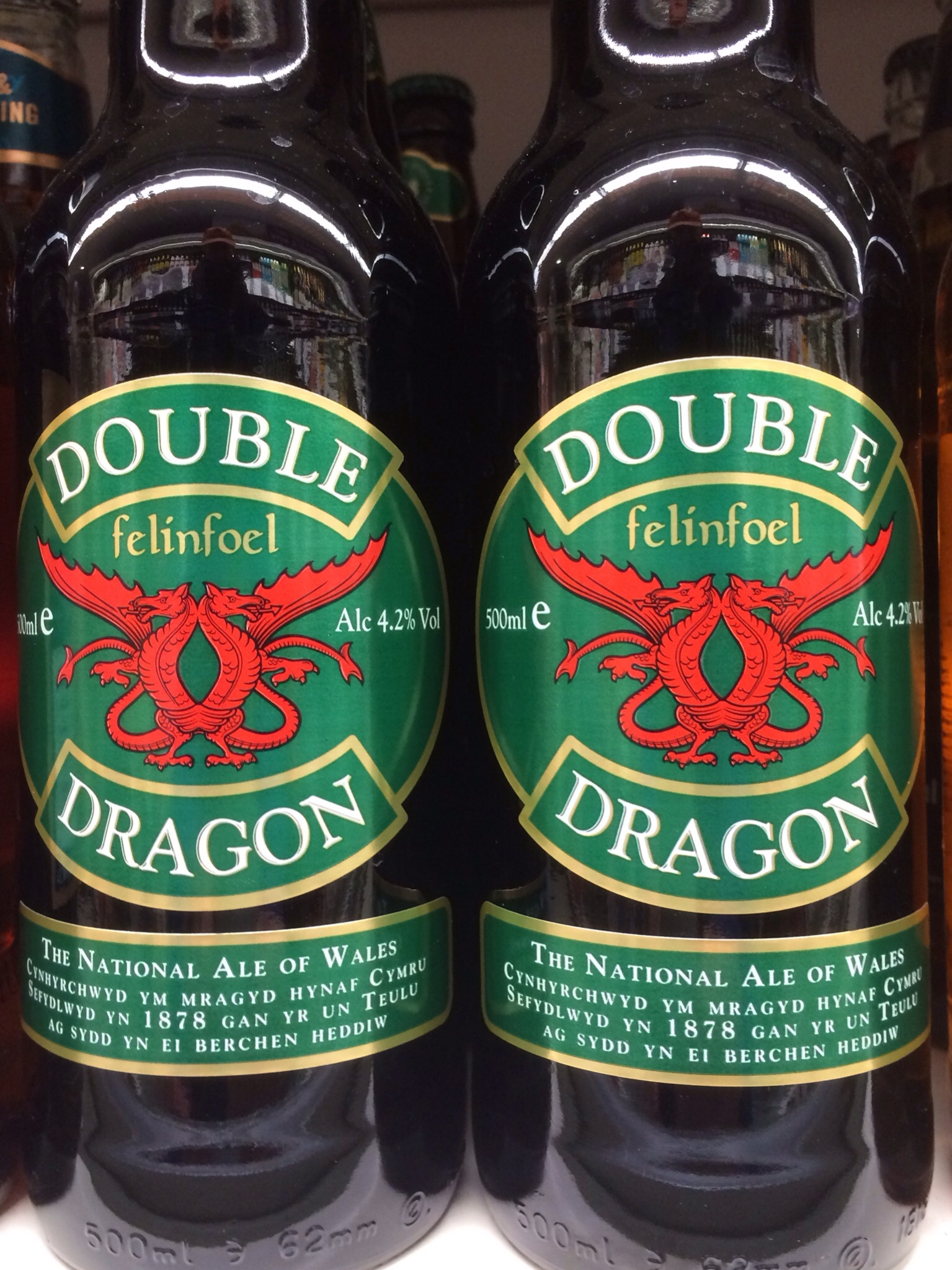
Bottles of Felinfoel Double Dragon Ale

Felinfoel Brewery Company based at Felinfoel, Llanelli, is a traditional brewery noted for cask ale and bottled beer. It was founded in 1840 and invented canned beer in 1935. Its Double Dragon beer is distributed as far as the United States, Germany and France. Evan Evans Brewery is a brewery based in Llandeilo producing ale called Cwrw, which is Welsh for beer.

The Towy Valley Cider Company is based in Carmarthen Their cider is made to a traditional recipe using apple juice pressed on the farm. It is matured in oak barrels and then kept for at least a year before distribution, which makes it a strong, clear, still cider.

Jin Talog is a single botanical London dry gin produced in the village of Talog, Carmarthenshire. Coles Family Brewers, based in Llanddarog, produce Welsh whiskey, gin and vodka

Brecon Carreg is a natural spring water which is either still or sparkling, and is produced at Trap, Carmarthenshire.

== Other markets and box schemes ==
Other markets include Ammanford street market (every Friday), Llandeilo open air market (every Friday), Carmarthen farmers’ market (first Friday of every month), Llandovery market (last Saturday of every month), Ammanford farmers’ market (last Thursday of every month).

There are 3 large-scale food and drink festivals held at Carmarthen Showground in Carmarthen, showcasing the best in season of the county's food, drinks and crafts: the Winter Show, the Spring Show and the Summer Show.

Box schemes are provided by Organics to Go, based at Golden Grove near Llandeilo, which includes specific items to order and delivers throughout South and West Wales. M & M Organics of Pontyberem, Llanelli run a box scheme covering Carmarthenshire and Pembrokeshire areas. The Organic Pantry, based in Ammanford, does door deliveries.

== See also ==
- Welsh cuisine
- Cuisine of Ceredigion
- Cuisine of Gower
- Cuisine of Monmouthshire
- Cuisine of Pembrokeshire
- Cuisine of Swansea
- Cuisine of the Vale of Glamorgan
