= List of breweries in Scotland =

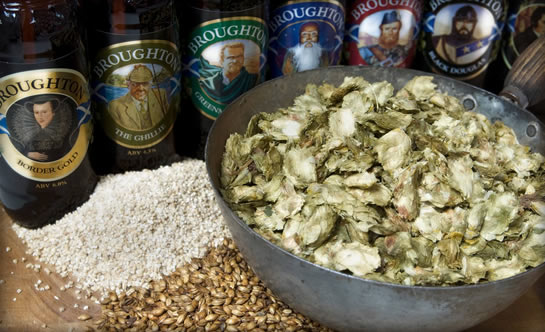
Broughton Ales beer range

This is a list of breweries in Scotland. Beer has been produced in Scotland for approximately 5,000 years. The Celtic tradition of using bittering herbs remained in Scotland longer than in the rest of Europe. Most breweries developed in the Central Lowlands, which also contained the main centres of population. Scottish brewing reached a peak of 280 breweries in 1840. The merger of breweries led to changes; the higher hop content of some of the beers allowed them to travel better than previous products, thus creating a higher quality product for export. Edinburgh and Alloa in particular became noted centres for the export of beer around the world. By 1920, there were only 62 brewers left. The decline continued, and by 1960 there were only 26, and by 1970 they had dropped to just 11.

At the end of the 20th century, small breweries had begun to spring up all over Scotland, and the decline was reversed. The CAMRA Good Beer Guide 2015 states that Scotland is home to 80 breweries; this has since grown to over 100.

== Operational breweries ==
=== A–C ===
- 6° North Brewery, Stonehaven, Aberdeenshire
- 71 Brewing, Dundee
- Abernyte Brewery, Abernyte
- Alechemy, Livingston
- Andrews Ales, Cummertrees
- Arran Brewery, Isle of Arran
- Ayr Brewing Company, Ayr
- Barney's Beer, Edinburgh
- Beath Brewing, Cowdenbeath
- Beeches Brewery, Lochgelly
- Belhaven Brewery, Dunbar
- Bellfield Brewery, Edinburgh
- Black Isle Brewery, Munlochy
- Black Metal, Loanhead
- Black Wolf, Stirling
- Born in the Borders Brewery, Jedburgh
- BrewDog, Fraserburgh and Ellon
- Brewgooder,
- Brewmeister, Aboyne, Aberdeenshire
- Brew Toon Peterhead, Aberdeenshire
- Broughton Ales, Biggar
- Cairngorm Brewery, Aviemore
- Campervan Brewery, Leith, Edinburgh
- Clockwork Beer, Glasgow
- Cold Town Beer, Edinburgh
- Cromarty Brewing, Cromarty
- Cuillin Brewery, Isle of Skye

=== D–I ===
- Deeside Brewery, Banchory Aberdeenshire
- Drygate Brewery,Glasgow
- Eden Brewery St Andrews, Guardbridge, St Andrews
- Edinburgh Beer Factory, Edinburgh
- Ethical Ales, Mauchline
- Fierce Beer, Aberdeen
- Five Kingdoms Brewery, Newton Stewart
- Freewheelin Brewery, Peebles
- Fyfe Brewing Company, Kirkcaldy
- Fyne Ales, Cairndow, Argyll
- Glen Spean Brewing Co., Spean Bridge
- Hanging Bat Brewing Co., Edinburgh
- Harviestoun Brewery, Alva, Clackmannanshire
- Hebridean Brewing Company, Stornoway, Isle of Lewis
- Holy Goat Brewing, Dundee
- Houston Brewing Company, Houston, Renfrewshire
- Hybrid Brewing, Grangemouth
- Innis & Gunn, Edinburgh (brewed in Glasgow by Wellpark Brewery)
- Inveralmond Brewery, Perth
- Isle of Skye Brewing Company, Isle of Skye

=== J–Q ===
- Jaw Brew, Glasgow
- John o' Groats Brewery, John o' Groats
- Jump Ship Brewing, Patched
- Kelburn Brewery, Barrhead, East Renfrewshire
- Kerr's Farm Brewed Ales, Midlothian
- Kinneil Brew Hoose, Bo'ness
- Knops Beer Company, Edinburgh
- Lade Inn Brewery, Callander
- Lawman Brewing, Glasgow
- Lerwick Brewery, Lerwick
- Loch Lomond Brewery, Alexandria, West Dunbartonshire
- Loch Ness Brewery, Drumnadrochit
- Lola Rose Brewery, Wanlockhead
- Monolith Brewery, Glasgow
- Moonwake Beer Co Leith
- MòR Brewing, Dundee
- Newbarns Brewery, Leith
- Odyssey Brothers, Edinburgh
- Old Worthy Brewing Company, Hebrides
- Orkney Brewery, Sinclair Breweries, Orkney
- Overtone Brewing co, Glasgow
- Pilot Beer, Leith

=== R–Z ===
- Scottish Borders Brewery, Ancrum
- Sheep in Wolf's Clothing, Dunblane
- Shilling Brewing Company, Glasgow
- Sinnister Brew, Midlothian
- Six North Brewery, Stonehaven
- Spey Valley Brewery, Mulben
- Speyside Craft Brewery, Forres
- St Andrews Brewing, St Andrews
- Stewart Brewing, Edinburgh
- Strangers Brewery Co, Linlithgow
- StrathBraan Brewery, Dunkeld
- Sugar Pine Brewing, Dunbar
- Sulwath Brewers, Castle Douglas
- Swannay Brewery, Orkney
- Tempest Brew Co, Tweedbank
- Tennent Caledonian Brewing company Glasgow
- Tinpot Brewery, Bridge of Allan
- Traditional Scottish Ales, Stirling
- Traquair House Brewery, Peebles
- Twisted Ankle Brewing Company Aboyne, Aberdeenshire
- Up Front Brewing, Glasgow
- Valhalla Brewery, Shetland
- Vault City Brewing, Edinburgh
- Wellpark Brewery (Tennent's, Innis & Gunn), Glasgow
- West, Glasgow
- Williams Brothers Brewing Company, Alloa
- Windswept Brewing, Lossiemouth
- Winton Brewery Haddington
- Wooha Brewing, Nairn

== Defunct breweries ==
- Alice Brewery, Inverness 1983-1988
- The Alpha Project Brewery, Edinburgh
- Atlas Brewery, Kinlochleven 2002-2004
- Caledonian Brewery, Edinburgh - 2023
- Coul Brewing Company, Glenrothes - 2022
- Devanha Brewery, Aberdeen 1982-1984
- Edinbrew Brewery, Livingston, West Lothian
- Fallen Brewing, Stirling - 2022
- The Ferry Brewery, South Queensferry, Edinburgh - 2023
- Glaschu Brewery, Glasgow 1994-1996
- Holyrood Brewery, Edinburgh 11th century - 1986
- Maclays Brewery, Alloa 1830-2001
- McEwan's, Edinburgh 1856-2008
- Scottish & Newcastle, Edinburgh 1749-2004
- Strathalbyn Brewers, Clydebank 1982-1987
- Strathaven Ales, Strathaven - 2023
- StrathBraan Brewery, Dunkeld - 2022
- Top Out Brewery, Loanhead - 2023
- Tryst Brewery, Falkirk -2023
- Younger's, Edinburgh 1778-1931

== Champion Beer of Scotland ==
The Champion Beer of Scotland (also known as CBOS) is an award for Scottish beers presented by the Campaign for Real Ale (CAMRA), at their annual Scottish Traditional Beer Festival in Edinburgh.

== See also ==
- Beer in the United Kingdom
- Beer and breweries by region
- Beer in England
- List of breweries in England
- Beer in Northern Ireland
- Beer in Wales
