= Champion Beer of Scotland =

Annual award presented by CAMRA

The Champion Beer of Scotland (also known as CBOS) is an award for Scottish beers presented by the Campaign for Real Ale (CAMRA).

CAMRA also awards the Champion Beer of Britain and the Champion Beer of Wales.

== Winners ==
Year	Gold	Silver	Bronze
1996	Caledonian 80/-	Caledonian Deuchars IPA	Broughton Ales Scottish Oatmeal Stout
1997	Caledonian 80/-	Belhaven 80/-	Caledonian Deuchars IPA
1998	Caledonian Deuchars IPA	Caledonian 80/-	Isle of Skye Red Cuillin
1999	Harviestoun Bitter & Twisted	Isle of Skye Red Cuillin	Caledonian Deuchars IPA
2000	Orkney Dark Island	Houston St Peter's Well	Harviestoun Brooker's Bitter & Twisted
2001	Inverlamond Ossian's Ale	Houston St Peter's Well	Harviestoun Bitter & Twisted
2002	Harviestoun Bitter & Twisted	Orkney Brewery Dark Island	Orkney Red McGregor
2003	Orkney Dark Island	Isle of Skye Black Cullin	Harviestoun Bitter and Twisted
2004	Cairngorm Trade Winds	Isle of Skye Black Cullin	Harviestoun Bitter & Twisted
2005	Cairngorm Black Gold	Cairngorm Trade Winds	Isle of Skye Black Cullin
2006	Kelburn Cart Blanche	Cairngorm Black Gold	Cairngorm Trade Winds
2007	Highland Brewing Company (Orkney) Dark Munro	Fyne Maverick	Fyne Piper's Gold
2008	Highland Brewing Company (Orkney) Scapa Special	Harviestoun Bitter & Twisted	Highland Brewing Company (Orkney) Orkney Best
2009	Orkney Brewery Raven Ale	Orkney Red MacGregor	Caledonian XPA
2010	Highland Brewing Company (Orkney) Orkney Blast	Black Isle Hibernator Oatmeal Stout	Cairngorm Black Gold
2011	Isle of Skye Cuillin Beast	Cairngorm Black Gold	Houston Peter's Well
2012	Highland Brewing Company (Orkney) Best	Highland Brewing Company (Orkney) IPA	Fyne Ales Maverick
2013	Fyne Ales Jarl	Cairngorm Black Gold	Highland Brewing Company (Orkney) St Magnus Ale
2014	Kelburn Brewing Company Dark Moor	Ayr Brewing Company Rabbie's Porter	Fyne Ales Jarl
2015	Cairngorm Black Gold	Highland Brewing Company (Orkney) Scapa Special	Cromarty Red Rocker
2016	Tryst Raj IPA	Ayr Brewing Company Rabbie's Porter	Cairngorm Black Gold
2017	Loch Lomond Silkie Stout	Cromarty Rogue Wave	Isle of Skye Young Pretender and Sulwath Black Galloway
2018	Swannay Orkney IPA	Black Isle Hibernator	Orkney Red MacGregor
2019	Windswept Weizen	Broughton Old Jock	Cairngorm Black Gold
2021	Fyne Ales Jarl	Orkney Dark Island	Five Kingdoms Dark Storm Loch Lomond Silkie Stout
