= Beer in Edinburgh =

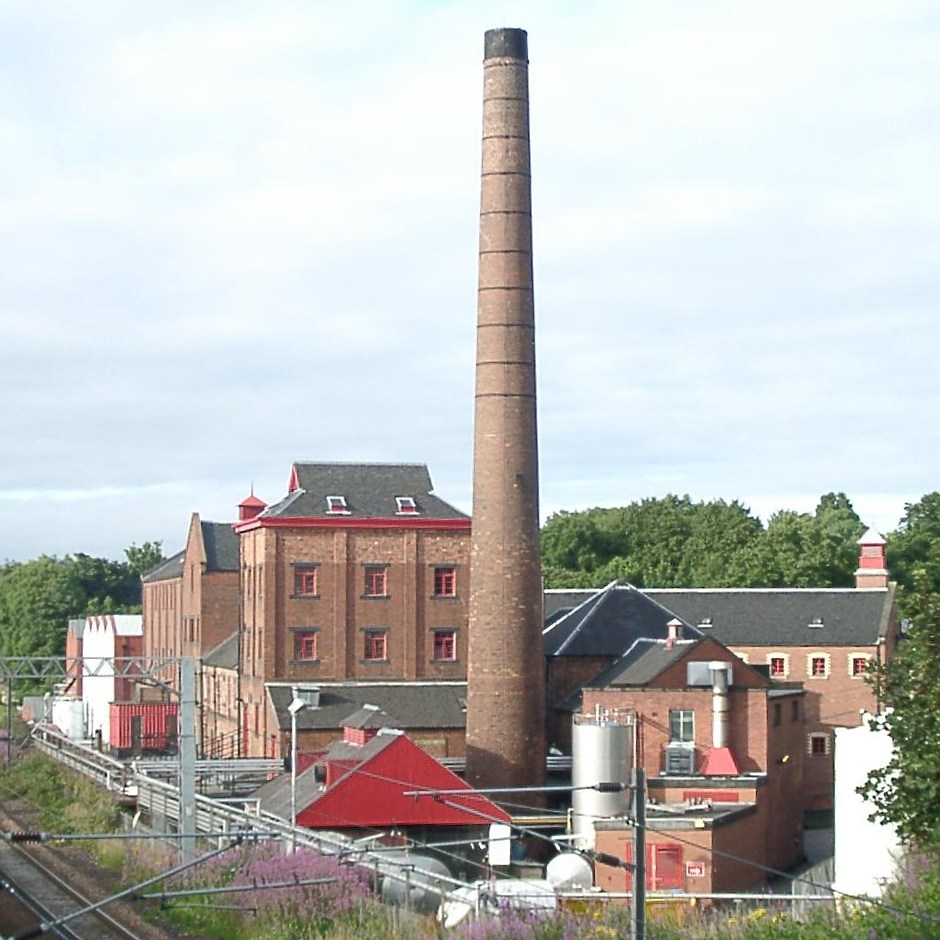
Caledonian Brewery

The history of beer in Edinburgh is perhaps the lengthiest of any region of Scotland. Throughout the history of Edinburgh, brewing takes its place as one of the most important and oldest industries. The origin of brewing goes back to the 12th century monks of Holyrood Abbey, who took advantage of the clear spring water for the production of their ale. The brewing industry certainly contributed to Edinburgh's earned moniker of "Auld Reekie" so named due to all the smoke produced by coal and wood burning furnaces and boilers. This is evidenced by the fact that at the turn of the 20th century, Edinburgh had no less than thirty-five breweries churning out this smoke from its maltings and brewhouses. This haze may not have been so noticeable were it not for the density of the buildings and population in such proximity. There are two lists below, one for defunct and one for operational breweries & microbreweries in Edinburgh.

== Operational breweries ==
Name	Location	Established
Barneys Beer	Summerhall Place, Edinburgh	2012
Pilot	Stewartfield, Edinburgh	2013

== Closed breweries ==
Name	Established	Closed	Notes
Caledonian Brewery	1869	2022	42 Slateford Rd, Edinburgh. Bought out By Heineken in 2008, then closed in 2022.
McEwans	1856	2008	Bought out by Heineken in 2008, then by Wells & Young's Brewery in 2011
Younger's_Brewery	1778	1931	Merged with McEwans

== See also ==
- List of breweries in Scotland
