= Shilling (disambiguation) =

The shilling is a historical coin, and the name of a unit of modern currencies formerly used in several countries.

== Currencies ==
- Shilling (British coin), circulating until 1990
- Shilling (English coin), a silver coin of the Kingdom of England from king Henry VII with the forerunner, the testoon
- Shilling (Irish coin), circulating until 1993
- Shilling (Australian), a coin minted 1910–1963
- Shilling (New Zealand coin)
- East African shilling
- Kenyan shilling
- Somali shilling
- Somaliland shilling
- Tanzanian shilling
- Ugandan shilling

== Other uses ==
- Shilling, the grading system for Scottish ale
- Shill bidding or shilling, a practice to increase interest in a product
- Shilling (surname), with a list of notable people

== See also ==
- Schilling (disambiguation)
  - Austrian schilling, the former currency of Austria
- Shieling, a hut, or collection of huts, once common in wild or lonely places in the hills and mountains of Scotland and northern England
- Shiling (disambiguation)
- Skilling (currency), the Scandinavian equivalent of the shilling
