= Hebridean Brewing Company =

Former brewery in Stornoway, Scotland

- Hebridean Brewing Company
- Location: Stornoway, Scotland, UK
- Opened: 2001
- Owned by: Andrew Ribbens (independent)

Active beers
Name	Type
Berserker Export Ale	Scotch Ale
Celtic Black Ale	English Porter
Clansman Ale	American pale wheat ale
Islander Strong Premium Ale	Scottish Ale
Moo Coo Brew	Scottish Ale
Seaforth Ale	English pale ale

Hebridean Brewing Company (Companaidh Grùdaidh nan Innse Gall) was an independent microbrewery founded in 2001 (although production did not begin until late January 2002) by Andy Ribbens in Stornoway on the Isle of Lewis, Scotland. The brewery produces cask ale and filtered beer in bottles.

== History ==
Andrew Ribbens, who originates from the South East of England, founded the Hebridean Brewing Company in Stornoway, on the Isle of Lewis, Scotland in 2001. His previous job, working for a pharmaceutical company, was relocated and Ribbens had the choice of either moving with the job or accepting redundancy. He chose the latter and began a phase of researching into the art and business of brewing beer, lager and ale.
Before establishing the company, Ribbens worked at two different independent breweries to gain experience, the Freeminer Brewery in the Forest of Dean near Steam Mills, and the Flagship Brewery in Kent.
In late August 2000, the Environmental Services Department received a planning application, from Ribbens, to convert 18A Bells Road, Stornoway into a Brewery. During 2002, the HIE Innse Gall, a local enterprise support organisation, received a grant request from the Hebridean Brewing Company. The grant request outlined Ribbens' projected costs to "Plant and install equipment". Ribbens' project cost £28,000, of which, the WIE, the Western Isle's Enterprise, granted £14,000 in assistance.

=== Incidents ===
In 2004, confusion was raised as to whether a shipment of Hebridean Brewing Company beer, worth over £20,000, would be accepted onto shelves by retailer, Safeway (Now known as Morrisons). An agreement was reached between the independent brewery and the retailer, to supply Safeway stores across Scotland with the Hebridean Brewing Company beer at the end of February, 2004. But following the agreement between the brewery and retailer, Safeway was taken over by Bradford-based retailer, Morrisons. The confusion was whether or not Safeway's new owners still wished to have the beer, to which Morrison's stressed that they had been unaware of any problem and offered to negotiate a new deal.

The brewery premises were broken into on 25 June 2006. Scottish Police believed several youths gained unauthorised access to the property and stole an estimated £500 worth of bottled beer. Subsequently, through their investigations, police arrested and formally charged two males in connection with the robbery and recovered some of the stolen alcohol. The males, both 17, were charged with theft.

=== Expansion ===
Andy Ribbens, owner of the brewery, stated in 2006 that he would like to expand the brewery to make it more accessible to the public in the form of a tourist area, cafe, shop and sampling room. Ribbens has said that he would like a new premises inside Stornoway town centre. Of his preference for a location, he said would prefer a building away from housing but still visible to passing trade. His reasons for his interest in expanding were to attract the public to visit the brewery. The Brewery has now moved to a brand new premises (April 2016), alongside the brewery is a bar where patrons can sample the whole range of Hebridean Brewery Beers.

The company was dissolved in 2019.

== About ==
The brewery's production focuses on a mash tun and a wort copper. Specifically, the wort copper is of a fountain arrangement with a steam coil in its interior. Steam powers the plant, which is generated via a boiler, a Fulton 30e. The malt used in the liquor is whole grain, which is milled on the premises by a gristmill. A centralised panel monitors the temperature statuses and operates as the control unit in the brewery. The bottling plant consists of a CW250 double head bottle filling apparatus. The beer and ale conditioning tanks were converted from barrel cellar cylinders.

=== Marketing ===
The cask ales are available in various pubs around Britain and at British beer festivals. The filtered bottled ales are sold in the Scotland and specialist beer outlets in Britain. The company also distributes for domestic consumption, food service, retailing, and wholesale.

==== Sponsorship ====
The Hebridean Brewing Company sponsors the Sail Hebrides Maritime Festival. A boating festival that focuses on yachting and sailing. The company specifically supports the festival by sponsoring a rowing boat race where teams of three compete against each other in and around the Isle of Lewis for the Hebridean Brewing Company Prize. The firm also sponsors the Stornoway Running and Athletics Club. Including its 'Half-Marathon' (Approx. 13 miles) which takes place on an on-road off-road course around Stornoway and Lews Castle. Since 2003, the Hebridean Brewing Company has sponsored and produced a beer specifically for the Hebridean Celtic Festival. The music festival aims to celebrate the Celtic culture of Scotland as well as the Isle of Lewis. The beer that the brewery has made for the annual event is called the Celtic Festivale.

==== Exhibitions and Festivals ====
The Hebridean Brewing Company uses various 'Food and Drink' exhibitions and festivals as a method of promoting their brands of beer and ale. Most notable among them are:

- The Taste of Tain, an international food and drink festival promoting produce from in and around Tain, occurred on 1 September 2007. Among its exhibitors were the Hebridean Brewing Company.
- The 2007 edition of CAMRA's Great British Beer Festival was also its 30th anniversary. The Hebridean Brewing Company was one of 18 Scottish breweries that attended the festival.
- Newark Beer Festival, 2006, England. The Hebridean Brewing Company was represented by, the now discontinued, Firebreak ale.

== Beers ==
The brewery produces the following six regular beers:

Beer name	Style	ABV %
Berserker Export Ale	Scotch Ale/Wee Heavy	7.50
Celtic Black Ale	English Porter	3.90
Clansman Ale	American Pale Wheat Ale	3.90
Islander Strong Premium Ale	Scottish Ale	4.80
Moo Coo Brew	Scottish Ale	4.40
Seaforth Ale	English Pale Ale	4.20

=== Berserker Export Ale ===
Berserker Export Ale

The Berserker, named after the Viking warrior and the rook in the Lewis Men chess set, is a strong pale ale known as a Wee Heavy.

In November 2006, the Hebridean Brewery won the 'Camra', the Campaign for Real Ale's Champion Winter Beer of Scotland 2006 for their Berserker pale ale.

In June 2007, the Herbidean Brewing Company's Berserker, was awarded the 'Silver medal' position by SIBA, the Society of Independent Brewers, for competing in the regional beer competition. The Berserker, competing in the 'Strong Ales' section (5% +), placed second to Traditional Scottish Ales' Red Mist.

=== Clansman Ale ===
At the Aberdeen Grampian and Northern Isles CAMRA beer festival, 2004, the Clansman Ale won 'Beer of the Festival'. The festival, in its 18th year as of 2004, was attended by approximately 3,000 people and 53 different breweries. Festival goers selected the Hebridean ale, chosen out of a pool of 77 other beers and ales, for the title ‘Beer of the Festival’. The Clansman beat 2004's Beer of Scotland, Cairngorm's Trade Winds, into second place.

=== Islander Strong Premium Ale ===
The Islander Strong Premium Ale was awarded the Marymas Fair Beer-of-the-Festival award in 2006. The annual Marymas Fair takes place during August in Inverness. The award for beer of the festival was presented to Andrew Ribbens, the breweries proprietor, by Inverness & Western Isles' CAMRA Chairman Bill Tring.
In 2003, the Islander won the SIBA bronze medal in the category, 'Beer of Scotland Premium Cask'.

== See also ==
- List of breweries in Scotland
