= Stewart Brewing =

Brewery in Midlothian, Scotland

Stewart Brewing Ltd.
- Interactive map of Stewart Brewing Ltd.
- Location: Loanhead, Midlothian, Scotland
- Coordinates: 55°52′21″N 3°09′42″W
- Opened: 2004
- Owned by: Steve Stewart
- Website: www.stewartbrewing.co.uk

Cask beers
- Name: Type
| Pentland IPA | IPA (also as bright beer) |
| Edinburgh No. 3 | Scotch ale |
| Edinburgh Gold | Golden ale (also as bright beer) |
| Copper Cascade | Dark ale |
| Stewart's 80/- | Heavy (also as bright beer) |

Bottled beers
| Hollyrood | Blonde ale |
| St. Giles | Dark ale |
| Edinburgh Gold | Golden ale |
| Embra | Amber ale |
| Dopplebock | Bock |
| Pilsen | Pilsner |

Seasonal beers
| Cauld Reekie | Stout |

Stewart Brewing is an independent craft brewery based on the outskirts of Edinburgh in Loanhead, Midlothian, Scotland.

It produces beer in small batches, available in approximately 200 real ale pubs in Edinburgh, the Lothians, Fife, the Borders, Glasgow and Newcastle. It also sells mini casks and bottled beers from its brewery shop. There is also a tasting room in Leith.

Stewart Brewing also has a range of canned and bottled beers, launched at the end of 2009.
