= Houston Brewing Company =

Former Scottish brewery

- Location: Houston, Renfrewshire, Scotland, UK
- Opened: 1997

The Houston Brewing Company was a brewery in the village of Houston, Renfrewshire, Scotland. It operated from 1997 to 2016.

For most of its existence was attached to, and operated in common with, the Fox & Hounds public house and, as a result of its size, is classed as a microbrewery. It produced a range of cask conditioned ales alongside a range of seasonal and bottled beers.

== History ==
The Houston Brewing Company was established in 1997 by Carl and Caroline Wengel in South Street, Houston in a premises attached to the Fox & Hounds pub and restaurant. In 2011 Houston Peter’s Well won Champion Beer of Britain and in 2012 the business was sold with the new owners closing the brewery in 2016. At its height, the brewery was distributing throughout the United Kingdom, including to Aldi supermarkets and the Wetherspoons pub chain.

=== Awards ===
Various beers from the Houston Brewing Company won a number of awards and accolades from the Campaign for Real Ale and the Society of Independent Brewers (SIBA) in both UK national and Scottish regional contests. Most notable amongst these achievements are:

- Champion Beer of Scotland 2000 - St Peter's Well
- Champion Beer of Scotland 2001 - St Peter's Well
- Champion Bitter of Britain 2005 - Killelan
- Champion Best Bitter of Scotland 2005 -
- Champion Best Bitter of Britain 2011 - Peter's Well

== Beers ==
The seven principal cask ales were (with alcohol by volume levels denoted):

- Killellan Bitter, 3.7%
- Peter's Well, 4.2%
- Texas, 4.3%
- Warlock Stout, 4.7%
- Blonde Bombshell, 4%
- Tartan Terror, 4.5%
- Black & Tan, 4.2%

A feature of the Houston Brewing Company was the range of season ales that are produced (currently one per month) for distribution throughout the UK. The caricature style labels for the seasonal beers often depict members of staff of the Fox & Hounds pub.

== See also ==
- Scottish beer
- Scottish Real Ale
- Houston, Renfrewshire
- List of breweries in Scotland
