= Black Isle Brewery =

Brewery in Munlochy, Scotland

Black Isle Brewing Co Ltd.

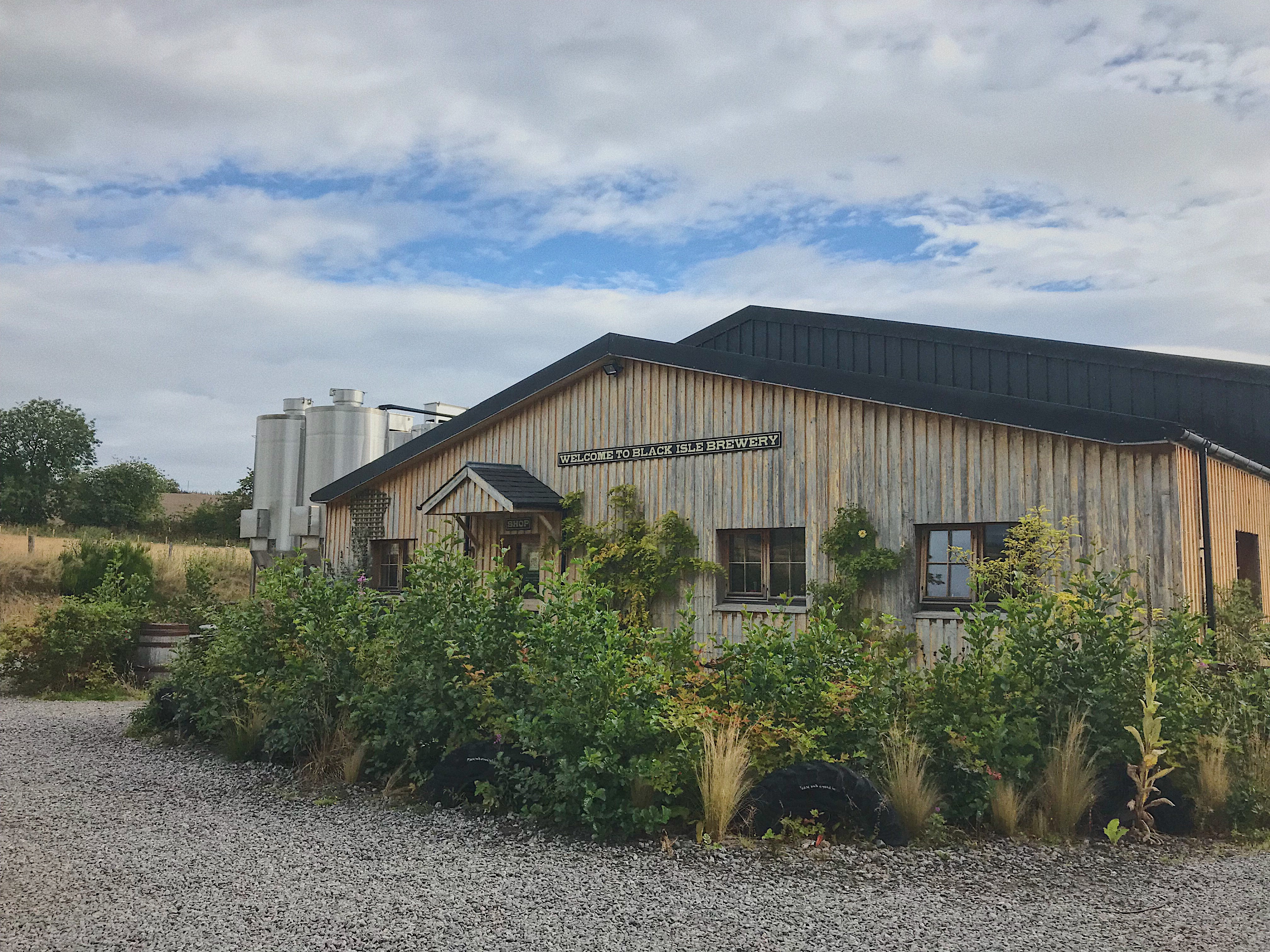
- Location: Munlochy, Scotland, UK
- Opened: 1998
- Owned by: Independent
- Website: www.blackislebrewery.com

Active beers
| Name | Type |
| Yellowhammer | India pale ale |
| Red Kite Ale | ale |
| Blonde | lager |
| Scotch Ale | Scotch ale |
| Porter | porter |
| Goldfinch | gluten free IPA |
| Spider Monkey | IPA |
| Hibernator | oatmeal stout |

Seasonal beers
| Name | Type |
| Helles | Gluten Free Lager |
| Treehouse | Pale Ale |
| Rhode Runner | New England pale ale |

Black Isle Brewery is an organic brewery based in Munlochy, Black Isle, Ross and Cromarty, Scotland.

All of their beers are organic and suitable for vegetarians, as they do not use isinglass in the brewing process.

== Organic production ==
The brewery manufactures organic beers using ingredients and produce from its organic farm and other organic suppliers. The company is heavily involved in the organic movement.

== See also ==
- Scottish Real Ale
