= SS Wallachia =

Steamship wrecked in 1895

Coordinates: 55°51′42″N 4°57′11″W

History
- Name: Wallachia
- Owner: Taylor & Cameron (1883-93), Burrell & Son (1893-95)
- Port of registry: Glasgow, UK
- Route: UK to the West Indies
- Builder: Oswald Mordaunt & Co., Southampton
- Completed: 1883
- Fate: wrecked 29 September 1895

General characteristics
- Type: steamship
- Crew: 21

The Wallachia was a cargo steamer wrecked in the Firth of Clyde in 1895 after a collision with the Norwegian steamship Flos. It was rediscovered in 1977 by hobby divers. Its cargo included a large consignment of bottled beer and other alcohol, including whisky; a 2021 research project successfully cultured yeast extracted from the century-old beer.

== Wreck ==
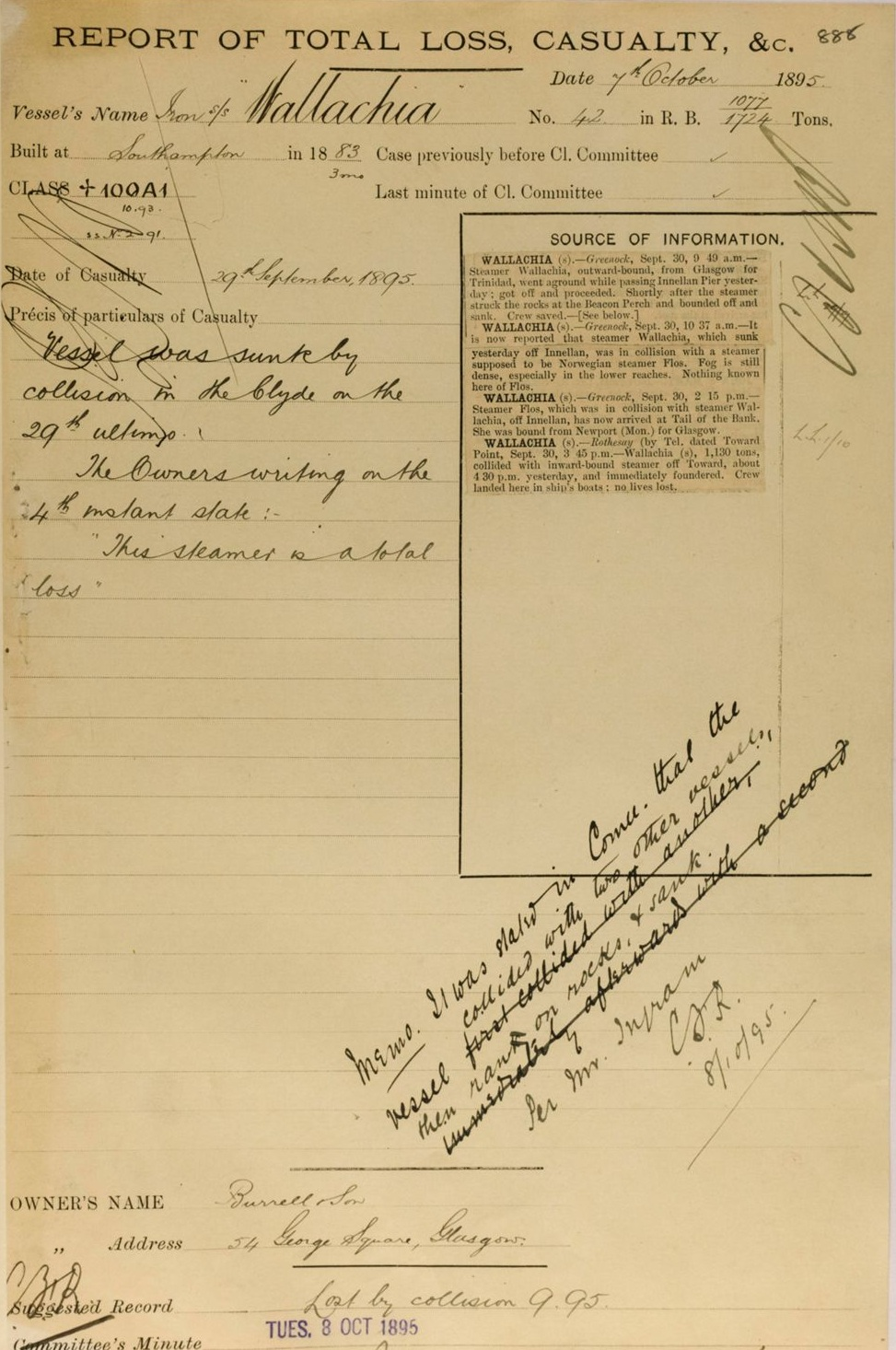
Report of the wreck of the Wallachia in 1895.

The Wallachia was built by Oswald Mordaunt and Company of Southampton in 1883, and at the time of the wreck was owned by William Burrell. On 29 September 1895, it left Glasgow bound for Trinidad with a cargo of beer, gin, whisky, glass- and earthenware, and the industrial chemical stannous chloride. There was heavy fog, and the Wallachia briefly ran aground near Innellan; the ship refloated as the tide rose, only to then encounter the Norwegian steamer Flos at close enough distance that it was impossible to avoid colliding. The 21-man crew and single passenger successfully evacuated in lifeboats and rowed to Toward Lighthouse. Twenty-five minutes after the collision, the Wallachia sank bow-down, with an explosion as it went underwater.

In 1977 the wreck was rediscovered by amateur divers from the Girvan Sub-Aqua Club, investigating an obstruction that had caught a local fisherman's nets. It lies roughly 30 metres down.

== Cargo of alcohol ==
Local divers have visited the wreck since its rediscovery, sometimes retrieving small amounts of the cargo, especially beer and whisky. The whisky is variously reported to taste "elegant and moving" or be "an utter abomination". At least one diver tried the beer and reported that it still formed a head, but had a "salty, putrefied" smell and similarly awful taste. After a century underwater, the bottles also sometimes exploded, as the gases inside expanded in the lower-pressure environment on land.

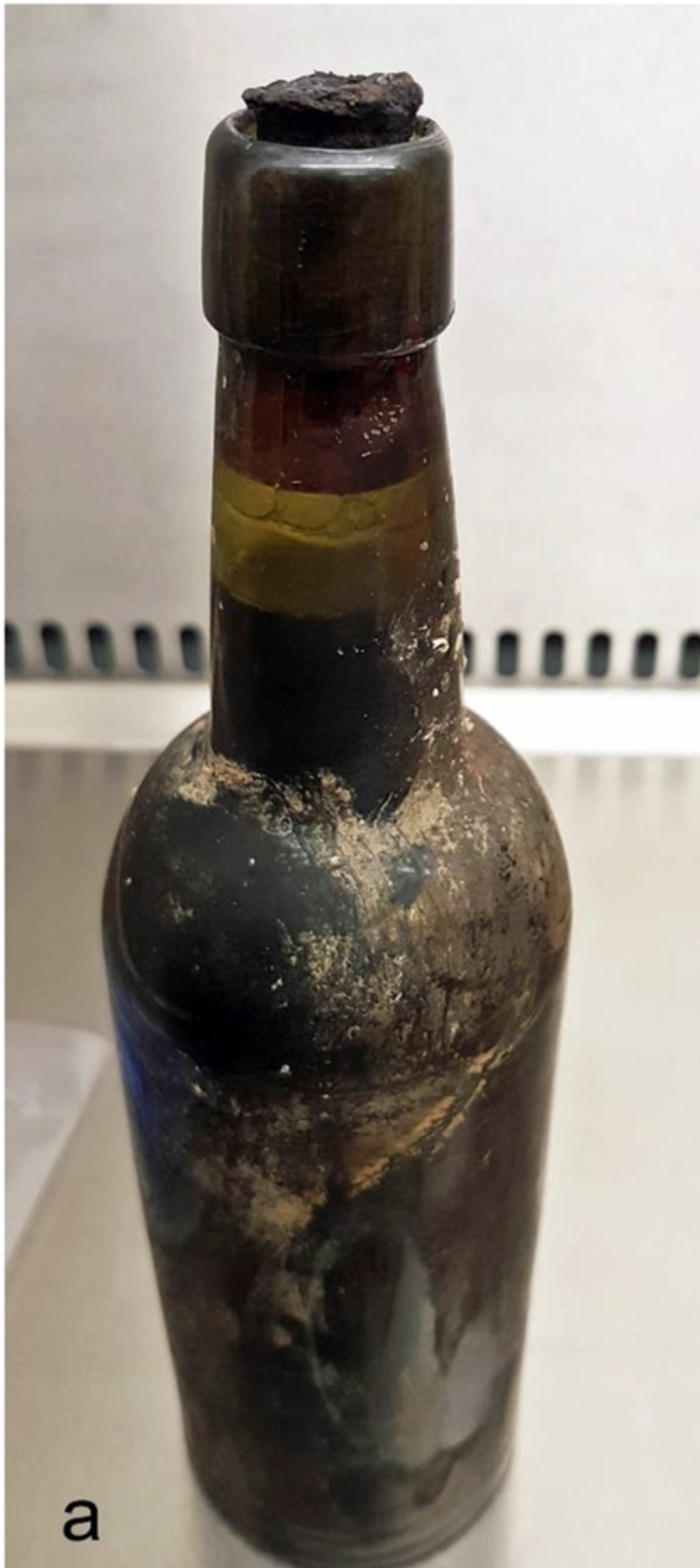
A bottle of McEwan's stout retrieved from the wreck, photographed for the Brewlab study.

=== Historic yeast ===
In 2018 and 2019, diver Andy Pilley provided several samples of McEwan's stout retrieved from the wreck to the brewing consultancy Brewlab. A team from Brewlab and the University of Sunderland analysed the beer, cultured the microorganisms present, and identified two yeast strains, Brettanomyces bruxellensis and Debaryomyces hansenii, by DNA testing. Both are rare in modern brewing, where Saccharomyces cerevisiae is the standard yeast used, and so are of interest to breweries wishing to diversify their recipes. Pilley described a recreation of the beer using the re-cultured yeast as having "hints of coffee and chocolate", while the study's lead author Keith Thomas described the yeasts as producing an earthy taste reminiscent of "wet horse".
