= Schilling =

Schilling may refer to:

- Schilling (unit), an historical unit of measurement
- Schilling (coin), the historical European coin
  - Shilling, currency historically used in Europe and currently used in the East African Community
  - Austrian schilling, the former currency of Austria
- Schilling rudder, a type of rudder allowing extra manoeuvrability
- A. Schilling & Company, an historical West Coast spice firm acquired in 1948 by McCormick & Company
- Schilling Air Force Base
- Schilling Power Station, an oil-fired power station near the nuclear power station at Stade, Germany
- Schilling of Solothurn, a family of two Swiss chroniclers
- The Schilling School for Gifted Children, a K-12 school in Cincinnati, Ohio

== People ==
- Schilling (surname)

== See also ==
- Schilling test in medicine
- Schillings, a firm of UK lawyers
- Schillings (surname)
- Skilling (currency)
