= Shilong =

Shilong may refer to:

- Shilong District, in Pingdingshan, Henan, China
- Shilong, Guangdong, a town in Dongguan, Guangdong, China
- Shilong, Hubei, a town in Jingshan County, Jingmen, Hubei
- Shilong Road station, station on the Shanghai Metro Line 3
- Shilong Temple, Tudigong temple in Zhongliao, Nantou, Taiwan

== See also ==
- Shiling (disambiguation)
- Shillong, capital of Meghalaya, India
