= Scotch Ale =

Style of beer

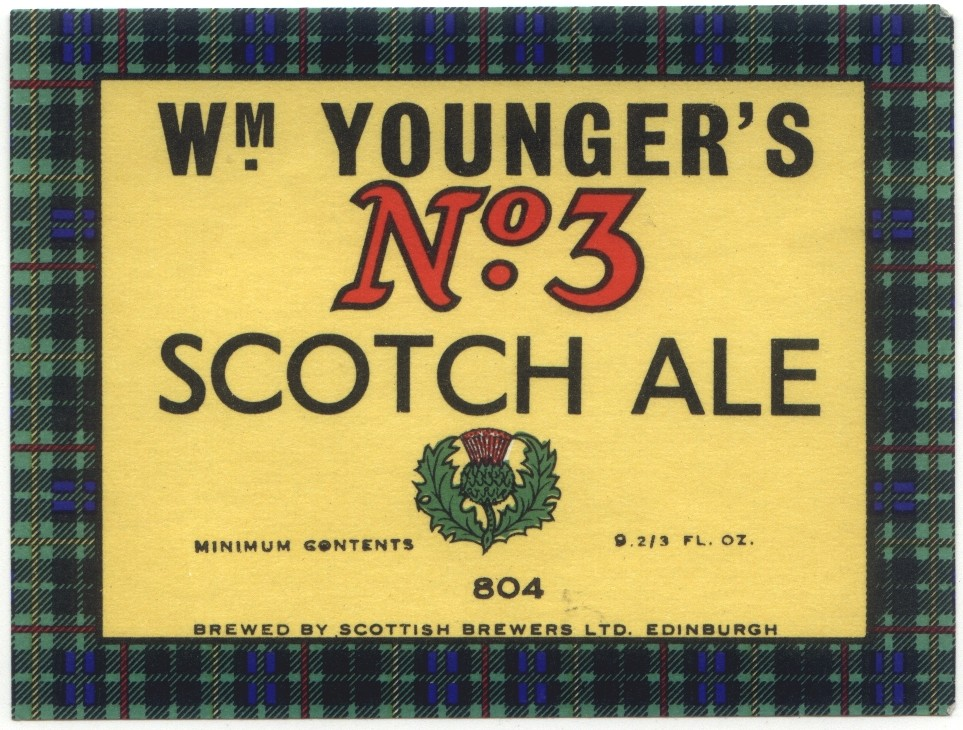
Younger's Scotch Ale label

Scotch ale is the Edinburgh version of Burton Ale: dark, with a bittersweet, sometimes slightly metallic tang, and generally strong. Scotch Ale was first used as a designation for strong ales exported from Edinburgh in the 18th century. The term has become popular in the USA, where strong ales which may be available in Scotland under a different name are sold in America as "Scotch Ale", for example, Caledonian's Edinburgh Strong Ale or Edinburgh Tattoo, is sold in the USA as Edinburgh Scotch Ale. As with other examples of strong ales, such as Barley wine, these beers tend toward sweetness and a full body. Examples from the Caledonian brewery would have toffee notes from the caramelizing of the malt from the direct fired copper. This caramelizing of Caledonian's beers is popular in America and has led many American brewers to produce strong toffee sweet beers which they label as a Scotch Ale. Scotch ales are an accepted style in Belgium: Gordon's Highland Scotch Ale, with its thistle-shaped glass is a well-known example, produced by the British-connected John Martin Brewery.

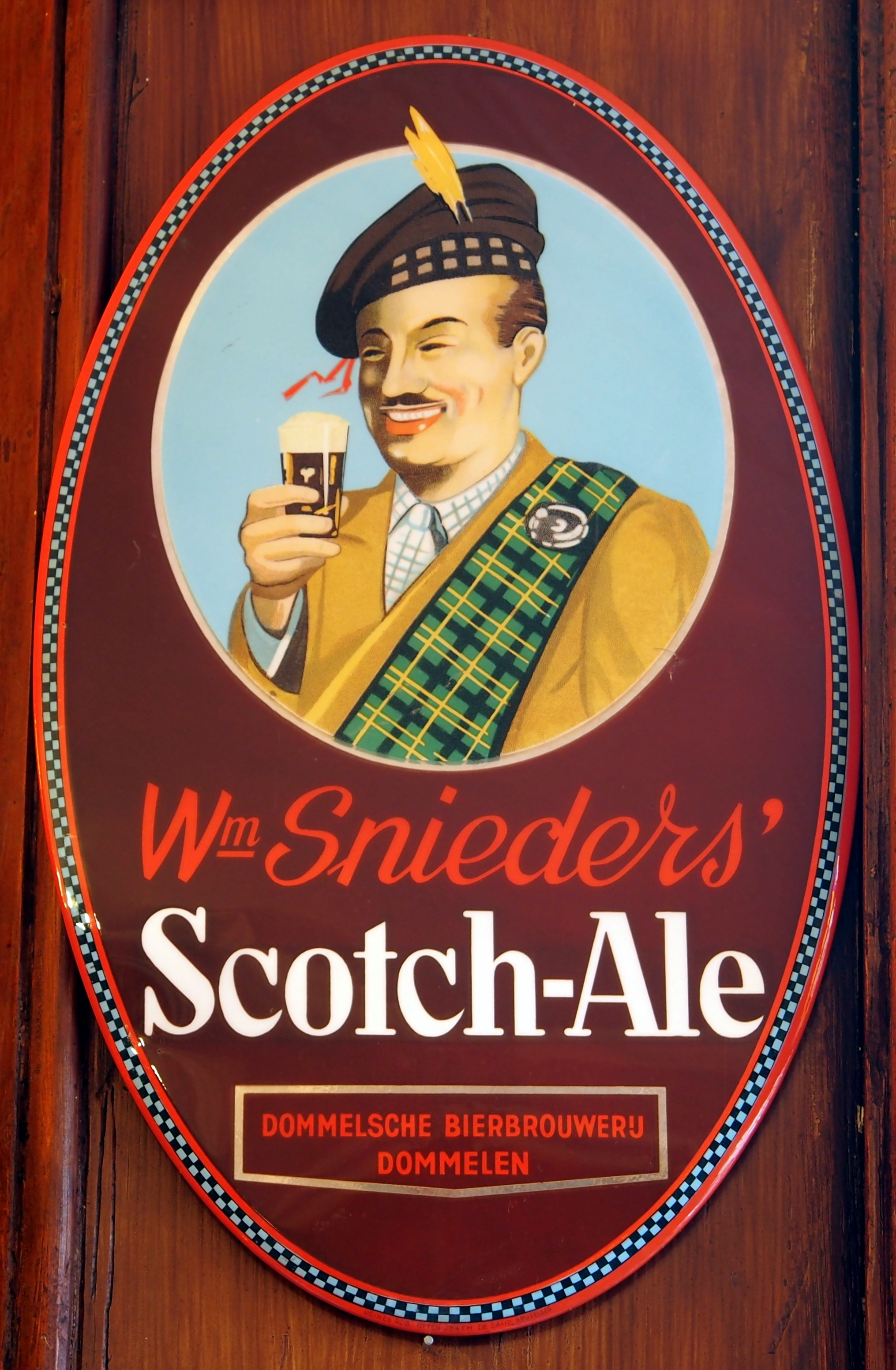
Scotch ale advertisement from the Netherlands

Scotch Ale or Whisky Ale is a designation used by brewers in France for peat-smoked malt flavoured beers. This style distinct from the Scotch ales mentioned above, for instance having a translucent amber colour, rather than opaque brown, appearance, and a smoky rather than sweet taste. Even though the malt used by distillers in Scotland is no longer dried by peat burning, some peat smoke flavour is added during malting by an additional process. Although recent research from brewing historian Ron Pattinson shows a lack of evidence for peat smoked malt being used by any Scottish breweries, American craft brewers often add peat smoked malt in their versions of Scotch ale. These malts are occasionally used in beers where the peat smoke flavour is reminiscent of whisky. The most popular French example is Fischer's Adelscott. The brewer Douglas Ross of the Bridge of Allan brewery made the first Scottish Whisky Ale for the Tullibardine Distillery in 2006; this beer was made with unpeated malt and aged in whisky barrels that had not contained a peated malt whisky so has a vanilla and nutty profile. Another Scottish brewery, Innis & Gunn, achieves a similar effect solely through barrel ageing.

While the full range of ales are produced, and drunk, in Scotland, the classic names used within Scotland for beer of the type described abroad as "Scotch Ale", are Light, Heavy and Export, also referred to in "shilling categories" as 60/-, 70/- and 80/- respectively, dating back to the 19th century method of invoicing beers according to their strength. The "/-" was the symbol used for "shillings exactly", that is, shillings and zero pence, in the pre-decimal £sd British currency, so the names are read as "60 (or 70 or 80) shilling (or bob) ale". (Although it was more normal to express values over £1 in terms of pounds, shillings and pence, which would give, in this example, £3, £3-10-0 (spoken as "three pound ten") or £4, the use of values in shillings and pence only was somewhat more common than saying 300p, 350p and 400p in decimal £p currency.)

Scotch Ale is sometimes conflated with the term "Wee Heavy", as both are used to describe a strong beer. Examples of beers brewed in the USA under the name Wee Heavy tend to be 7% abv and higher, while Scottish-brewed examples, such as Belhaven's Wee Heavy, can be found between 5.5% and 6.5% abv. McEwan's Scotch Ale is also 8% abv.

In North East England, "Best Scotch" refers to a beer similar to Mild Ale but with a drier, more burnt palate.

== See also ==
- Beer style
