= Swannay Brewery =

Brewery in Orkney, Scotland

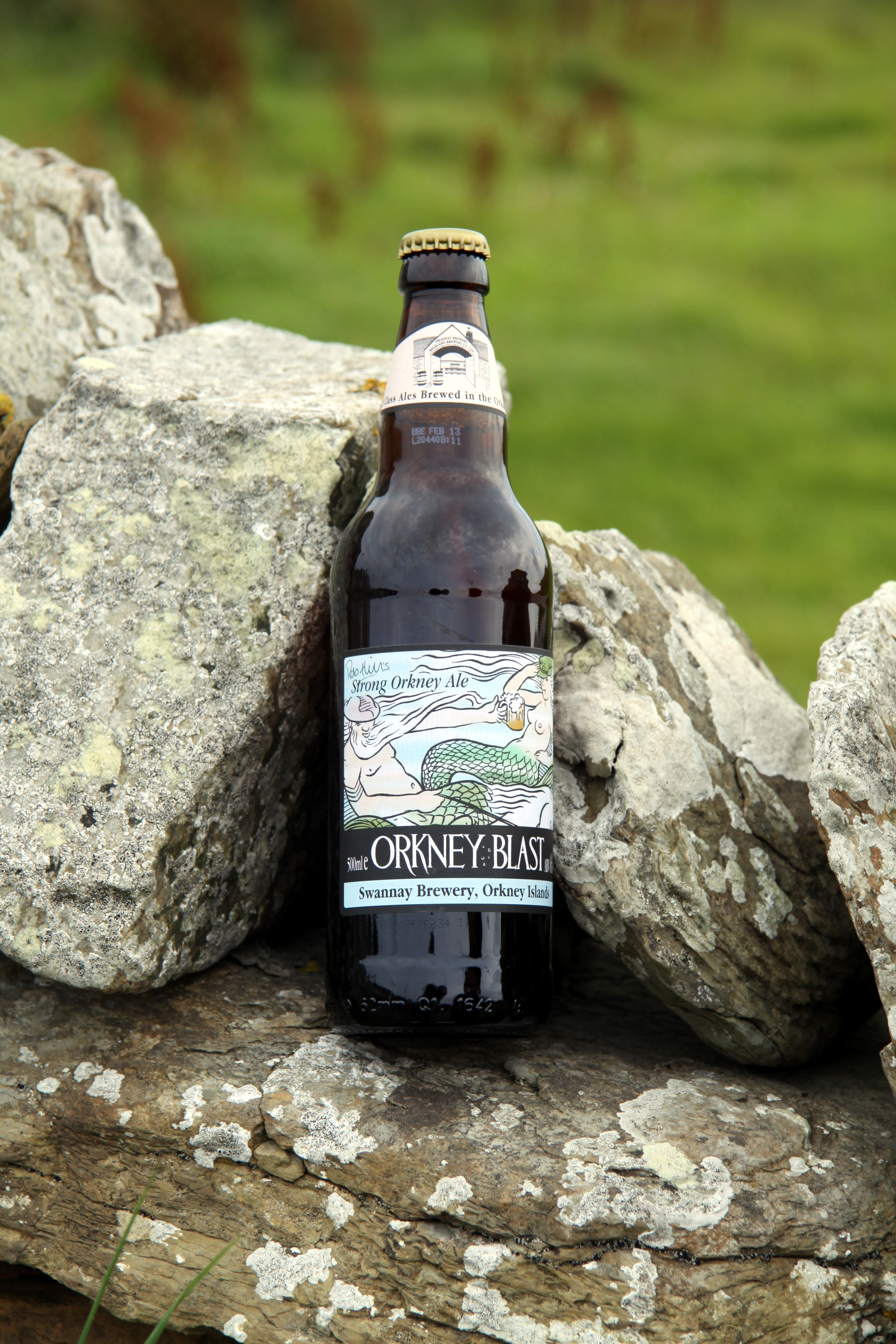
- Bottle of Orkney Blast
- Type: Brewery
- Location: Orkney, Scotland
- Opened: late 2004
- Key people: Rob Hill

Active beers
6
Name	Type

The Swannay Brewery is situated in Orkney, Scotland. It was founded as Highland Brewing Company in late 2004 by Rob Hill, formerly of the Orkney Brewery and Moorhouse's Brewery. It is situated in the old Creamery at Swannay Farms, Orkney Mainland.

Currently at least six beers are brewed all year round: Orkney Best, Dark Munro, Scapa Special, St Magnus Ale, Orkney IPA and Orkney Blast. There are also rotating seasonal ales, these include Light Munro, Island Hopping, Orkney Stout, Orkney Porter and Old Norway. Dark Munro was the CAMRA 2007 Champion Beer of Scotland. Scapa Special was the CAMRA 2008 Champion Beer of Scotland. Orkney Blast was the CAMRA 2010 Champion Beer of Scotland. Orkney IPA was the CAMRA 2012 Champion Beer of Scotland with Orkney Best getting the silver medal. Their Scapa Bere is brewed from bere, an ancient six-row barley cultivated mainly on Orkney.

In 2015 the brewery rebranded from Highland Brewing Company to Swannay Brewery.
