= Shiling =

Shiling could refer to the following towns in China:

- Shiling, Guangzhou (狮岭镇), in Huadu District
- Shiling, Lianjiang, Guangdong (石岭镇)
- Shiling, Laibin (石陵镇), in Xingbin District, Laibin, Guangxi
- Shiling, Baoting County (什玲镇), in Baoting Li and Miao Autonomous County, Hainan
- Shiling, Xiping County (师灵镇), Henan
- Shiling, Suqian (侍岭镇), in Suyu District, Suqian, Jiangsu
- Shiling (十岭村), Wulipu, Shayang, Jingmen, Hubei

== See also ==
- Shieling, a hut, or collection of huts, once common in wild or lonely places in the hills and mountains of Scotland and northern England
- Shilling (disambiguation)
- Shilong (disambiguation)
