= Beer in Scotland =

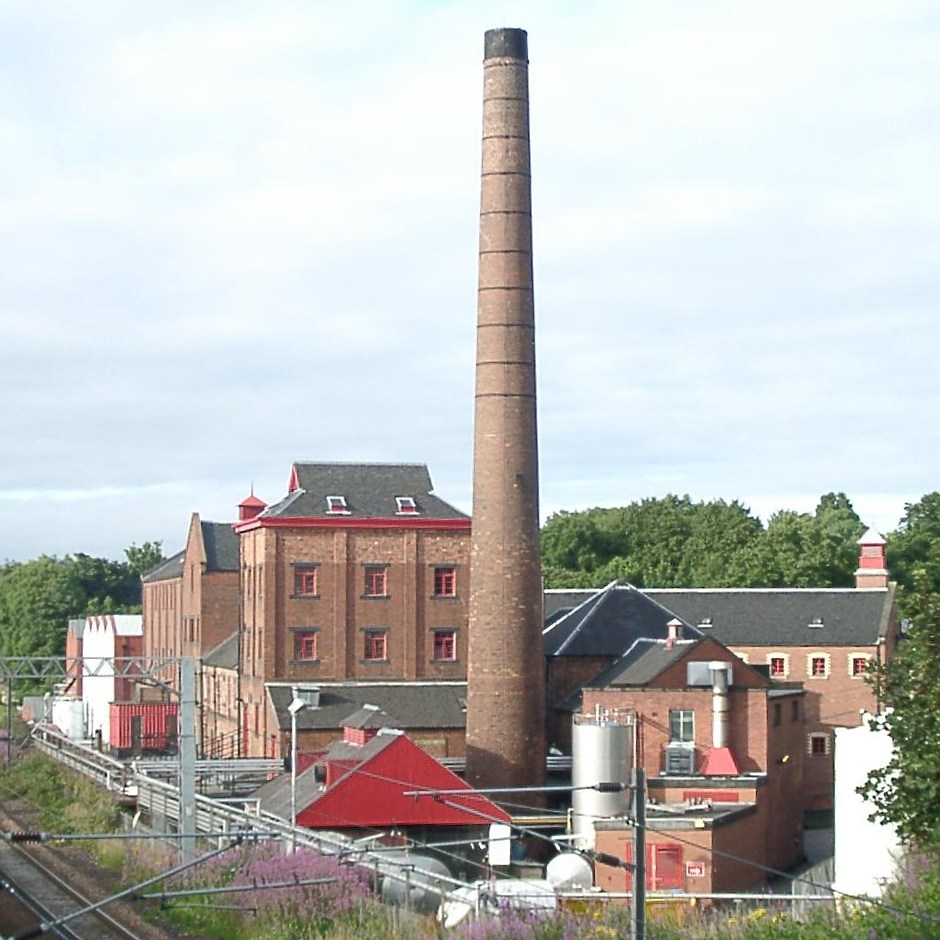
The Caledonian Brewery in Edinburgh in 2005

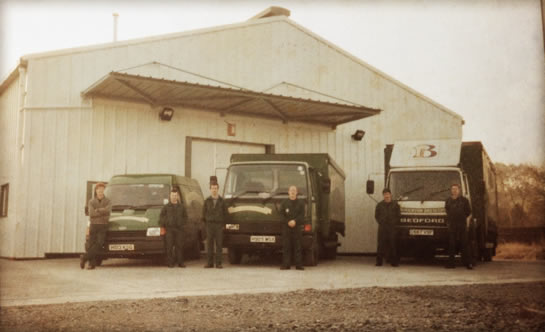
Broughton Brewery in 1979

Beer in Scotland is mostly produced by breweries in the central Lowlands, which also contain the main centres of population. Edinburgh and Alloa in particular became noted for the export of beer around the world in the 19th century.

== History ==
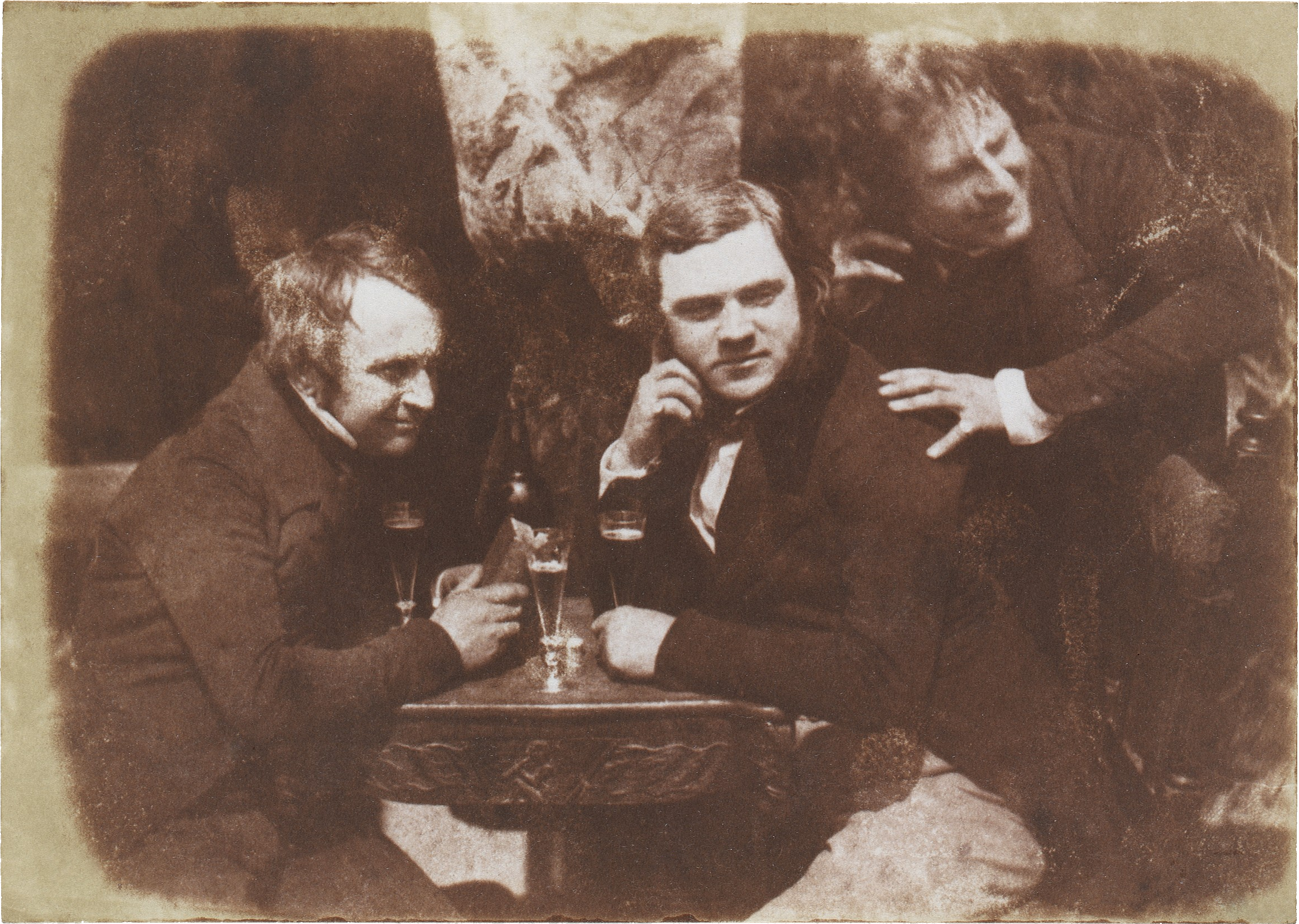
Edinburgh Ale, 1844, by Hill & Adamson. Perhaps the earliest photograph of men drinking beer

Brewing in Scotland goes back 5,000 years; it is suggested that ale could have been made from barley at Skara Brae and at other sites dated to the Neolithic. The ale would have been flavoured with meadowsweet in the manner of a kvass or gruit made by various North European tribes including the Celts and the Picts. The ancient Greek Pytheas remarked in 325 BC that the inhabitants of Caledonia were skilled in the art of brewing a potent beverage.

The use of bittering herbs such as heather, bog-myrtle, and broom to flavour and preserve beer continued longer in remote parts of Scotland than in the rest of the UK. Samuel Hartlib's description of the Scottish brewing process in the 17th century only mentions malt and water as ingredients, as well as birch twigs as a substitute for yeast. Thomas Pennant wrote in A Tour in Scotland (1769) that on the island of Islay "ale is frequently made of the young tops of heath, mixing two-thirds of that plant with one of malt, sometimes adding hops". Though, as in the rest of Britain, hops had replaced herbs in Scotland by the end of the 19th century, this Celtic tradition of using bittering herbs was revived in Brittany, France, during 1990 by Brasserie Lancelot, and in Scotland by the Williams Brothers two years later.

Even though ancient brewing techniques and ingredients remained in use later in Scotland than in the rest of the island of Great Britain, the general pattern of development was the same, with brewing mainly in the hands of "broustaris", or alewives, and monasteries, just as it was throughout Europe; though, as with brewing ingredients, the trend was for developments to move more slowly. The Leges Quatuor Burgorum, a code of burgh laws, showed that in 1509 Aberdeen had over 150 brewers – all women; and this compares with figures for London which show that of 290 brewers, around 40% were men. After the Reformation in the 1560s commercial brewing started to become more organised, as shown by the formation in 1598 of the Edinburgh Society of Brewers – though London had formed its Brewers' Guild over 250 years earlier in 1342.

However, after the Acts of Union 1707, new commercial opportunities emerged that proved a substantial stimulus to Scottish brewers. Tax on beer was lower than in other parts of the new kingdom of Great Britain, and there was no tax on malt in Scotland – this gave Scottish brewers a financial advantage. During the 18th century some of the best-remembered names in Scottish brewing established themselves, such as William Younger in Edinburgh, Robert & Hugh Tennent in Glasgow, and George Younger in Alloa. In Dunbar in 1719, for example, Dudgeon & Company's Belhaven Brewery was founded. Scottish brewers, especially those in Edinburgh, were about to rival the biggest brewers in the world.

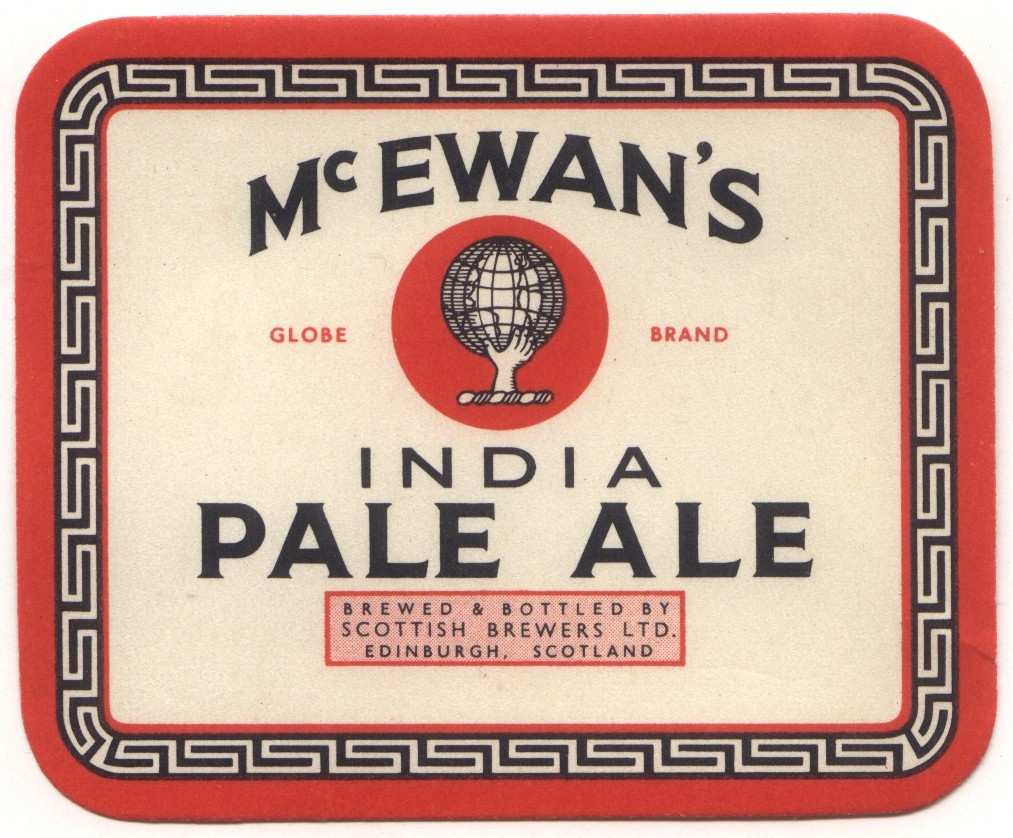
An Edinburgh brewer's IPA label

Some available information from brewing and trade records shows that brewers in the India Pale Ale (IPA) export trade in Edinburgh used hops as much as English brewers, and that the strong, hoppy ale that Hodgeson was exporting to India and which became known as IPA, was copied and brewed in Edinburgh in 1821, a year before Allsopp is believed to have first brewed it in Burton. Robert Disher's brewery in the Canongate area of Edinburgh had such a success with his hoppy Edinburgh Pale Ale that the other Edinburgh brewers followed, exporting strong, hoppy Scottish beer throughout the British Empire, and into Russia and America. The beer historians Charles McMaster and Martyn Cornell have both shown that the sales figures of Edinburgh's breweries rivalled those of Dublin and Burton upon Trent.

Charles McMaster, the "leading historian of the Scottish brewing industry" according to Roger Protz, believes that the hard water of Edinburgh was particularly suitable for the brewing of pale ale – especially the water from the wells on the "charmed circle" of Holyrood through Canongate, Cowgate, Grassmarket and Fountainbridge; and that due to the quality of this water, brewer Robert Disher was able to launch a hoppy Edinburgh Pale Ale in 1821. While Martyn Cornell in Beer: The Story of The Pint, shows that when the brewers of Burton in the late 19th century were exporting their hoppy Burton Ales in the form of India Pale Ale, so were the William McEwan and William Younger breweries. When the Burton brewers exported strong malty Burton Ales, so did the Edinburgh brewers, under the name Scotch Ale. The Edinburgh brewers had a very large and well-respected export trade to the British colonies rivalling that of the Burton brewers. By the mid-19th century Edinburgh had forty breweries and was "acknowledged as one of the foremost brewing centres in the world".

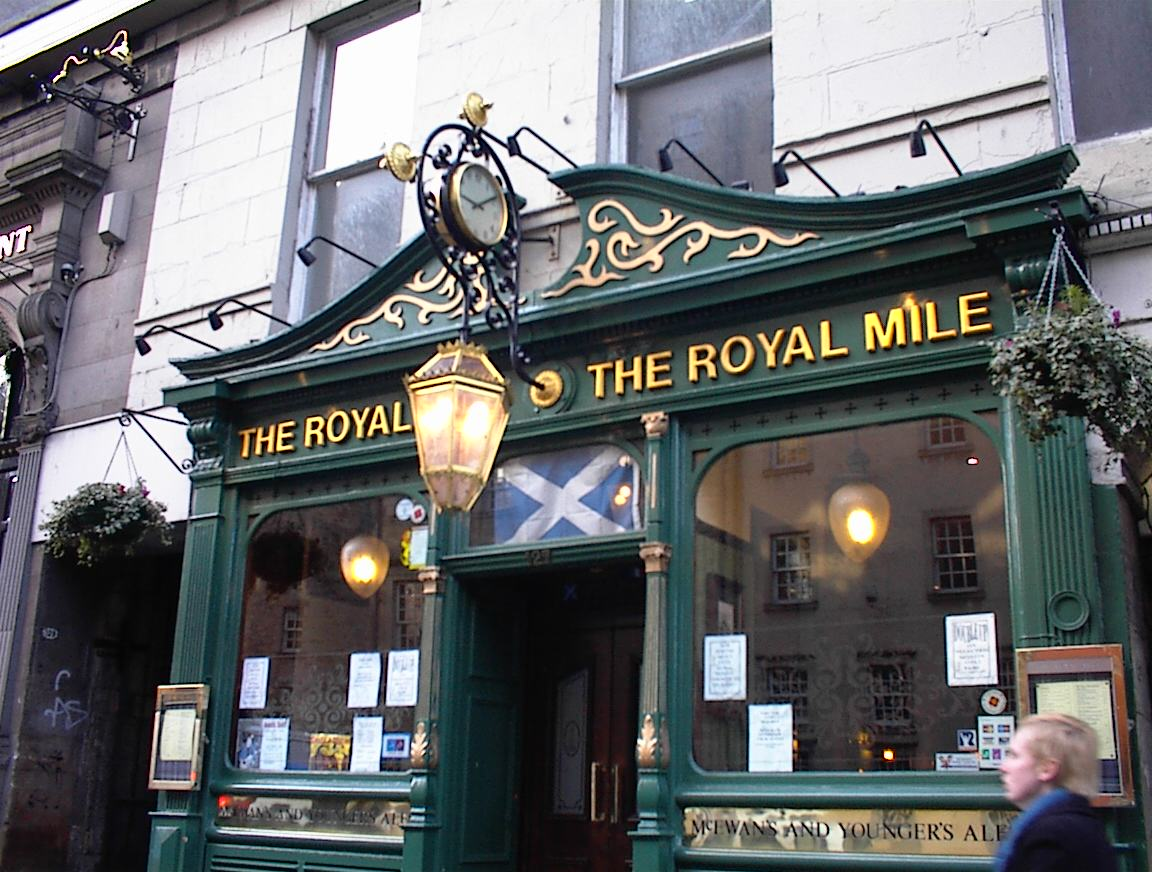
Pub on Edinburgh's Royal Mile

Some writers, such as Pete Brown in Man Walks into a Pub, believe that beer brewed in Scotland developed to be significantly different from beer brewed in England. The belief is that hops were used sparingly, and that the shilling designation was uniquely Scottish. However, a single pair of records can be cited indicating a similar use of hops in a Scottish pale ale to an English one. Dr John Harrison in Old British Beers gave a recipe for the English brewery Brakspear's 1865 50/- Pale Ale in which 1.8 oz of hops are used per imperial gallon (11 grams per litre), which compares with the Scottish brewery W. Younger's 1896 Ale No 3 (Pale) that also uses 1.8 oz of hops per imperial gallon.

== Scotch ales ==
"Scotch ale" was first used as a designation for strong ales exported from Edinburgh in the 18th century. The term has become popular in the US, where strong ales with low hop levels and a malty sweetness which may be available in Scotland under a different name are sold in America as "Scotch ales" and "Scottish ales". As with other examples of strong ales, such as barley wine, these beers tend toward sweetness from residual sugars, malty notes, and full bodies.

Scotch ales are an accepted style in Belgium: Gordon's Highland Scotch Ale, with its thistle-shaped glass is a well-known example, produced by the British-connected John Martin Brewery.

== Craft brewing ==
Since 2003, Innis and Gunn, an Edinburgh-based contract brewed virtual brewery whose beers are made in Glasgow, has been producing a range of oaked beers matured in Bourbon barrels. In 2016 the company crowd funded to establish a brewery in Perth. 2026 went into administration, being bought out by C & C who own Tennents who previously contract brewed their beers. As a result of administration the Perth brewery and taproom were closed.

Inspired by US craft brewers, Ellon's self-styled punk brewers Brewdog produce a varied range of bottled and keg beers. They have attracted considerable attention and controversy for rejecting the real ale format, and for the strength of their beers. After being criticised for brewing an 18.2% ABV beer, they responded with a 0.5% beer called "Nanny State", followed by a series of beers up to 55% ABV.

== Shilling categories ==
The shilling categories were based on the invoice price per hogshead (54 imperial gallons (250 L)) during the late 19th century. The stronger or better quality beers paid more beer duty and therefore cost more. Light beers might be in the range 42/- to 48/- (42-48 shilling); Younger's brewery produced heavy beers ranging from 80/- to 160/-. The same shilling designation was used for beer of different types. Usher's, for example, in 1914 brewed both a 60/- (60 shilling) Mild and a 60/- Pale Ale. In 1909 Maclay brewed a 54/- Pale Ale and a 54/- Stout. In 1954 Steel Coulson were still producing both a 60/- Edinburgh Ale and a 60/- Brown Ale on draught, both with a gravity of 1030; the third draught beer was 70/- P.X.A. at 1034. By the 1950s customers would ask for a strength of beer by names such as "heavy" and "export", rather than shillings; these two terms are still widely used in Scotland. Even though the practice of classifying beers by the shilling price was not specific to Scotland, during the cask ale revival in the 1970s Scottish brewers resurrected the shilling names to differentiate between keg and cask versions of the same beers. This differentiation has now been lost.

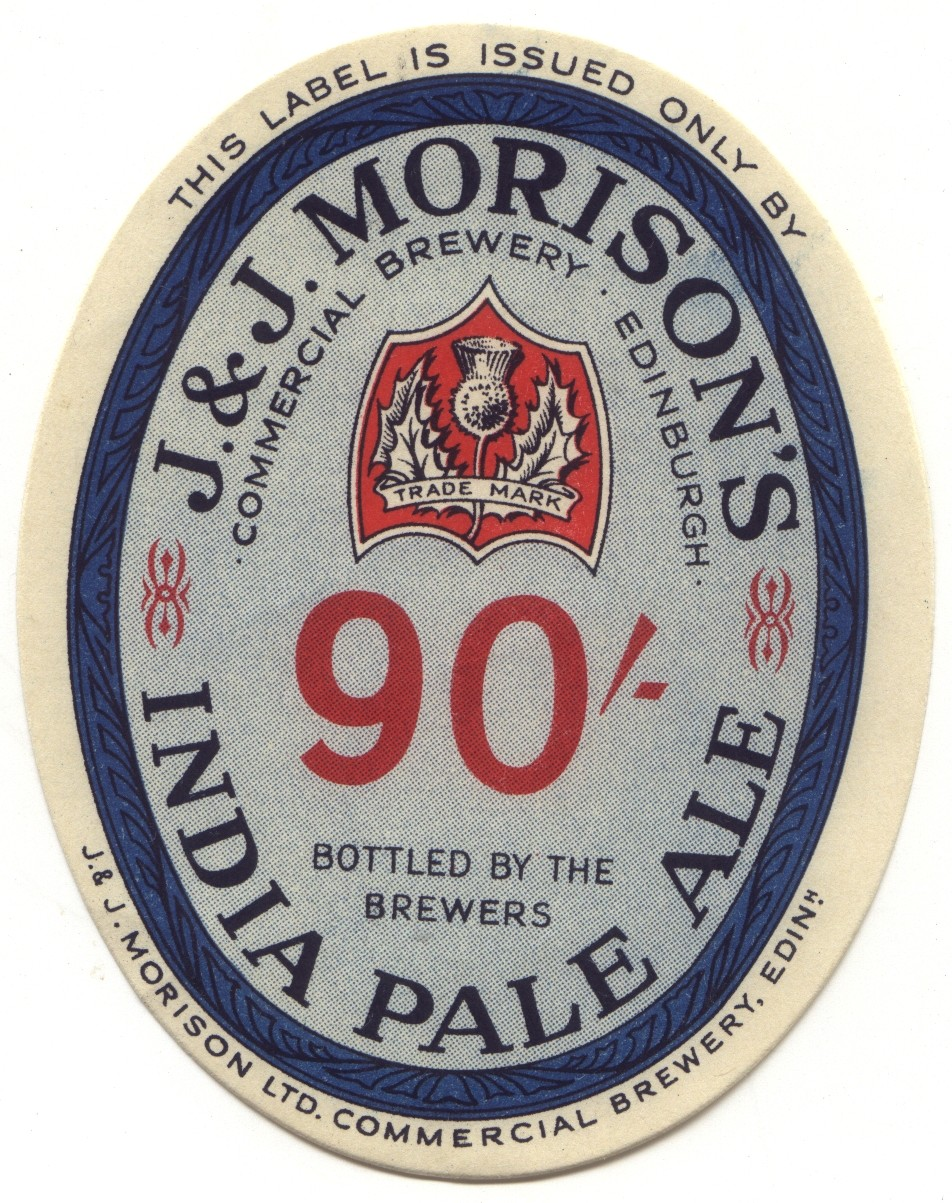
An Edinburgh 90 shilling label

While the shilling names were never pinned down to exact strength ranges, and Scottish brewers today produce beers under the shilling names in a variety of strengths, it was largely understood that:

Light
(60/-) was under 3.5% abv
Heavy
(70/-) was between 3.5% and 4.0% abv
Export
(80/-) was between 4.0% and 5.5% abv
Wee heavy
(90/-) was over 6.0% abv

/- is read as "shilling" as in "a pint of eighty-shilling, please". The "/-" was the symbol used for "shillings exactly", that is, shillings and zero pence, in the pre-decimal £sd British currency, so the names are read as "60 (or 70 or 80) shilling ale". Terminology for beer expressed the amount only in shillings rather than in pounds and shillings. See also solidus.

The "wee heavy" (named because it was typically sold in bottles in "nips" of 6 fluid ounces) has become the standard Scottish-style brew in the United States, and many brewers are now using non-traditional peated malts in the recipes.

== See also ==
- Beer in the United Kingdom
- Tall fount
