= Cairngorm Brewery =

Brewery in Scotland

Coordinates: 57.2009°N 3.8202°W

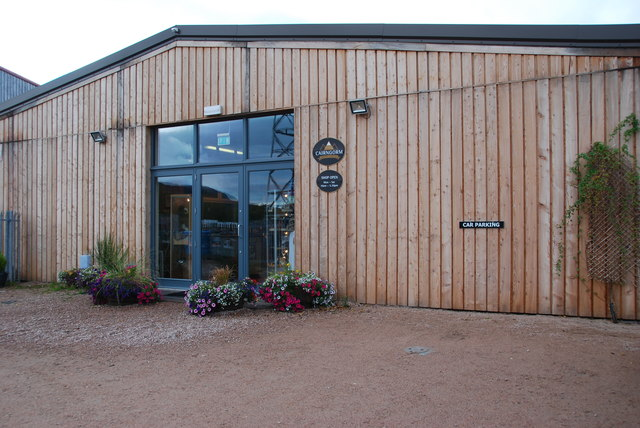
Cairngorm Brewery (2013)

Cairngorm Brewery is a brewery based in Aviemore in the Highlands of Scotland. It is situated on the Dalfaber industrial estate at the north end of the village and is within the Cairngorms National Park.

== History ==
Cairngorm Brewery was formed from the merger of Aviemore Brewery with Tomintoul Brewery. Tomintoul Brewery began brewing in 1993 and was based in an 18th-century watermill near the village of Tomintoul. It was taken over by Aviemore Brewery in 2000, which became Cairngorm Brewery the following year.

Cairngorm Brewery has supported the Highland Tiger Project, which is working to save the Scottish Wildcat. For each bottle of Wildcat beer sold, the brewery makes a donation to the project.

== Beers ==
Cairngorm produce a range of beers that are available all year in cask or bottle. They also produce a number of seasonal cask beers. Permanent beers include:

- Sheepshaggers Gold / Cairngorm Gold
- Stag
- Wildcat
- Nessies Monster Mash
- Black Gold
- Trade Winds
- Blessed Thistle
- Ginger Rodent – launched in November 2012 with Danny Alexander, at the time the local MP and Chief Secretary to the Treasury. The name derives from a comment by Labour politician Harriet Harman, who referred to Alexander as a “ginger rodent”.

Black Gold and Trade Winds have won a number of accolades in the Champion Beer of Scotland awards, presented by the Campaign for Real Ale.
