= Schillings (surname) =

Schillings is a surname. Notable people with the surname include:

- Benoit Schillings, Belgian software engineer
- Max von Schillings (1868–1933), German conductor, composer, and theatre director
- Charles Schillings, Belgian House DJ
- Red Schillings (1900–1954), American pitcher
