= Harviestoun Brewery =

Scottish craft brewery

Coordinates: 56.1497°N 3.7866°W

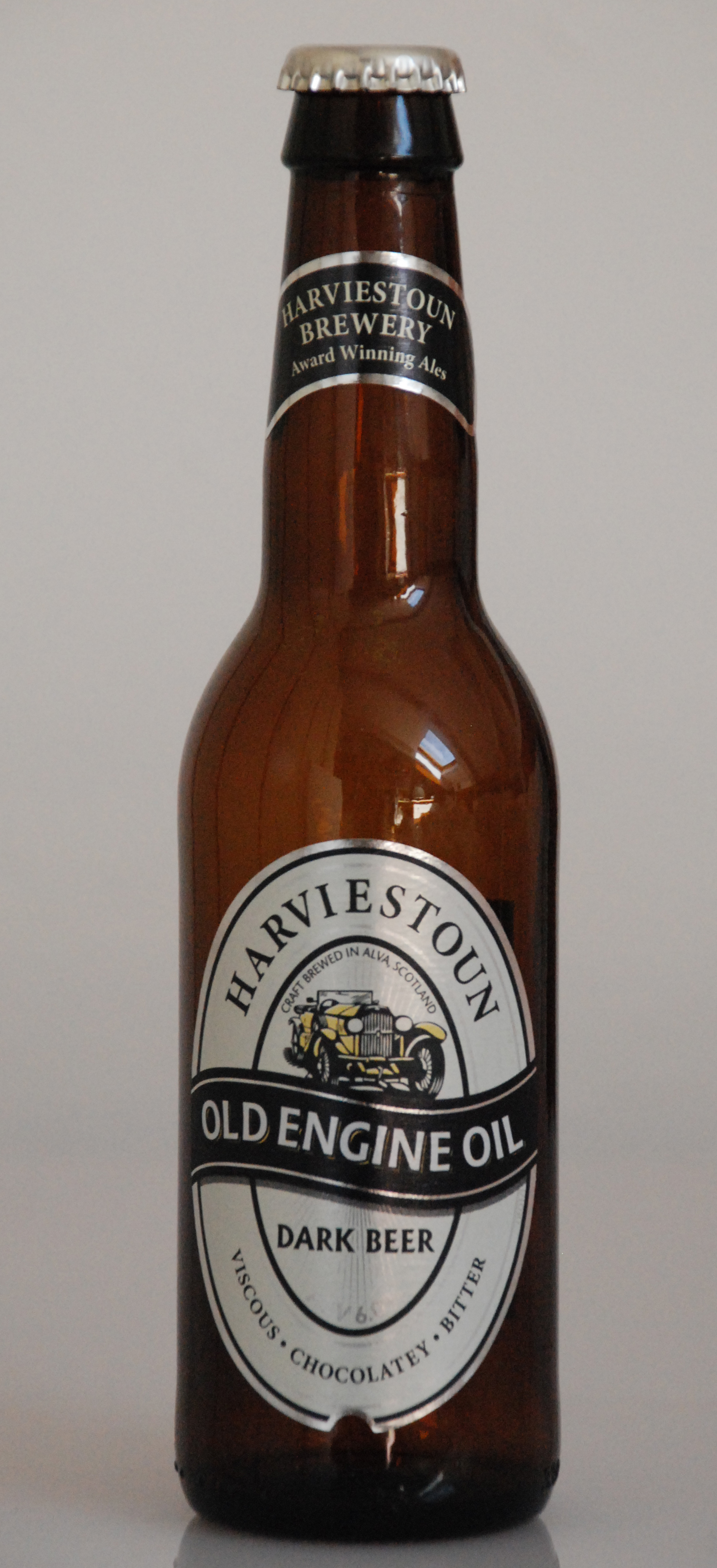

Harviestoun Brewery is a craft brewery based in Alva in Clackmannanshire, Scotland.

== History ==
Harviestoun Brewery was founded in 1983 by Ken Brooker in a 200-year-old stone barn on a farm, near Tillicoultry and Dollar in Clackmannanshire. In 2004 the brewery moved to Alva Industrial Estate in nearby Alva.

Harviestoun was bought by Caledonian Brewery in 2006. Following the takeover of Caledonian by Scottish & Newcastle in 2008, Harviestoun became independent again – it was bought by a group of Caledonian Brewery directors.

== Beers ==
Harviestoun produce a range of cask ales, craft lagers and filtered bottled beers. Harviestoun brew a beer called Ola Dubh (Scottish Gaelic for ‘black oil’) which is brewed in old Highland Park distillery casks and is 8% abv.

== Awards ==
Schiehallion was awarded the World's Best Pilsner in 2008 at the World Beer Awards, and the year previous in 2007, Bitter & Twisted was awarded World's Best Ale.

Bitter & Twisted has won a number of awards in the Champion Beer of Scotland and in 2003 won the Champion Beer of Britain, as presented by the Campaign for Real Ale.
