= Alechemy =

Scottish microbrewery

Alechemy is a microbrewery in Livingston, West Lothian, Scotland, which was founded by James Davies in 2012. Davies has a background in chemistry and microbiology, and it produces seven regular and eleven seasonal real ales.

== See also ==
- List of microbreweries
