= Shilling (surname) =

Shilling is a surname. Notable people with the surname include:

- Andrew Shilling (c. 1566–1621), English East India Company commander
- Beatrice "Tilly" Shilling (1909–1990), British aeronautical engineer and motorcyclist
- Carroll H. Shilling (1885–1950), American jockey
- David Shilling (born 1949), English milliner and fashion designer
- Eric Shilling (1920–2006), English opera singer
- Gary Shilling (born 1937), American financial analyst and commentator
- George Shilling (born 1966), English musician
- J. P. Shilling (born 1971), American speed skater
- Jennifer Shilling (born 1969), American politician
- Jim Shilling (1914–1986), American baseball infielder
- Jodi Shilling (born 1979), American actress
- John Shilling (1832–1884), American military officer
- Josh Shilling (born 1983), American musician
- Lindsay Shilling (born 1959), British musician
- Marion Shilling (1910–2004), American stage and film actress
- Nikolai Shilling (1870–1946), Russian military officer
- Richard Shilling (born 1973), British artist and photographer
