= Sinclair Breweries =

Parent company of Orkney Brewery in Quoyloo, Stromness, Orkney, Scotland

Orkney Brewery
- Location: Quoyloo, Stromness, Orkney, Scotland
- Opened: March 1988
- Owned by: Norman Sinclair
- Website: https://www.orkneybrewery.co.uk/

Sinclair Breweries Limited is the parent company for Orkney and Atlas ales. Orkney Brewery was founded in March 1988 at the old schoolhouse in Sandwick, Orkney, one mile from Skara Brae and was one of Scotland's first microbreweries. Atlas was formed in 2002 and merged with Orkney Brewery, where both beers are now brewed. Owned and run by Orcadian, Norman Sinclair, Orkney Brewery is Orkney's oldest brewery.

The brewery operates all year long brewing and supplying beer to the UK, Europe, Australia, Canada and the US with the Visitor Centre running from Spring to Autumn. The visitor centre is equipped with a Tasting Hall offering a full menu and Orkney Brewery Ales as well as shop where local crafts, merchandise and the beers are sold.

== History and development ==
The brewery is located in the former west mainland Victorian school in Quoyloo, which was founded in 1878. When Norman Sinclair took over in 2006, he made sure the school was preserved as much as possible while the brewery grew, especially since it was the school his father attended as a boy. In 2010 Norman rebuilt it into a new 30 barrel brew plant. The old school part was turned into a visitors' centre and tasting hall. The visitors' centre was awarded five-star status by the national tourism organisation VisitScotland, just weeks after opening to the public.

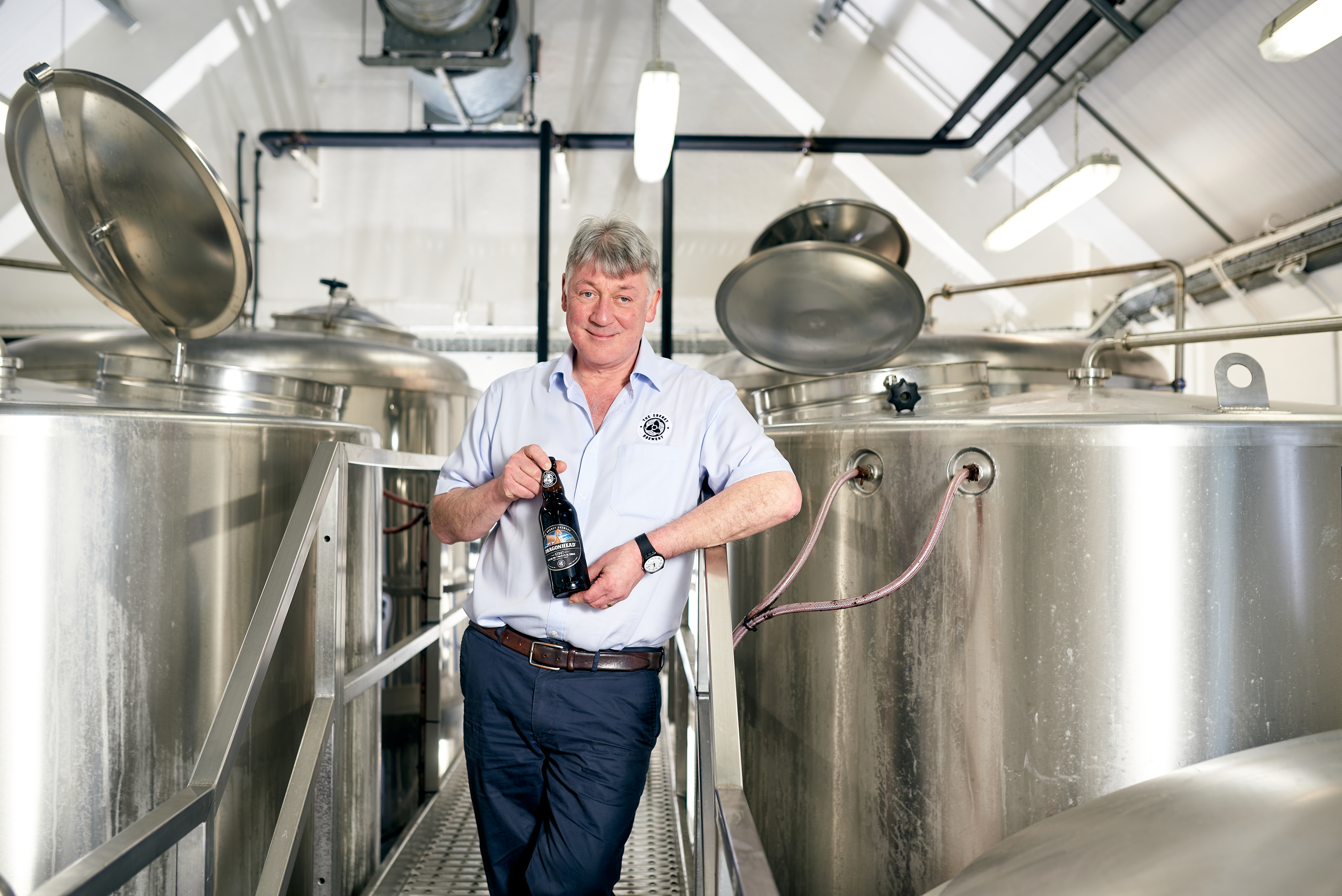

== Availability ==
The cask ales are available in various pubs around Britain and at British beer festivals. The filtered bottled ales are sold throughout Europe, North America, Canada, Australia, Japan, Hong Kong, and most of the European countries.

Bottled beer can also be found in supermarkets across the UK including Waitrose, Sainsbury's, Tesco, Lidl, Co-operative and Asda.

== Beers ==
The Orkney brewery produces cask ale and filtered beer in bottles, and since October 2005, a lager. Dark Island a rich, fruity, vinous dark ale, is the biggest seller. Dark Island has won Champion Beer of Scotland on several occasions. Red MacGregor, a 4% bitter has won the World Cask Beer Gold Medal (BIIA 2001). The same name is used for a 5% premium bitter available filtered in the bottle.

Orkney brewery uses isinglass in the production of all of its cask beers, making them unsuitable for vegetarians, but the bottles are vegan friendly.

Atlas Brewery was originally based in Kinlochleven in a category B listed former aluminium smelting facility. It closed in 2010 with operations moved to Orkney. Among its beers are Nimbus Pale Ale, Latitude Pilsner, and Three Sisters Scotch Ale which are available on tap and in bottles throughout Lochaber and Scotland. They also produce a number of seasonal beers.

=== Skull Splitter ===
Skull Splitter is an 8.5% abv wee heavy Skull Splitter won the award of Supreme Champion Winter Beer of Britain 2001 at CAMRA's national winter celebration of beer. Skull Splitter takes its name after Torfinn Hausakljuv who was nicknamed "Skullsplitter". Hausakluif, a Viking, was the 7th Earl of Orkney sometime around 950 AD.

== See also ==
- List of breweries in Scotland
