= McEwan's =

Scottish beer brand

- Industry: Alcoholic drink
- Founded: 1856
- Founder: William McEwan
- Headquarters: Edinburgh, United Kingdom
- Products: Beer
- Production output: 100,000 hectolitres (2012)
- Owner: Carlsberg Marston's Brewing Company

McEwan's is a brand of beer owned by Carlsberg Marston's Brewing Company. It was originally brewed by William McEwan's Fountain Brewery in Edinburgh, Scotland. The McEwan's brand passed to Heineken in 2008 after their purchase of Scottish & Newcastle's British operations. Heineken sold the brand to Wells & Young's in 2011, who sold their brewing operation, including the McEwan brand to Marston's in 2017. Cans and bottles are now brewed in Bedford, England.

== History ==
William McEwan opened the Fountain Brewery in Fountainbridge, Edinburgh, in 1856. The firm underwent several mergers in the following century, including with local rival William Younger's, and later with Newcastle Breweries to form Scottish & Newcastle. Its popular brands included 80/-, a Heavy beer, and Export, an India Pale Ale. All of the draught beers (except Best Scotch) were brewed at the Caledonian Brewery in Edinburgh, whilst the canned and bottled beers were produced at the Eagle Brewery in Bedford, England. The beers are sold predominantly in Scotland and the North East of England.

Despite being the dominant presence in Scottish brewing for around a century, the McEwan's brands were neglected by Scottish & Newcastle, who concentrated on their global brands. The McEwan's ales were eclipsed by John Smith's Bitter and Belhaven Best and cask-conditioned beers such as Deuchars IPA, whilst the lager fell behind Tennent's.

McEwan's used a cavalier mascot, broadly based on the Frans Hals painting, the Laughing Cavalier portrait, which has been used since the 1930s. The company was a sponsor of football teams in the 1980s and 1990s, including Rangers F.C and Blackburn Rovers.

The McEwan's brand passed to Heineken in 2008 after their purchase of Scottish & Newcastle's British operations. Heineken sold the brand to Wells & Young's in 2011. In May 2017, Charles Wells Ltd sold its brewing business (including McEwan's) to Marston's.

=== Victorian beginnings ===
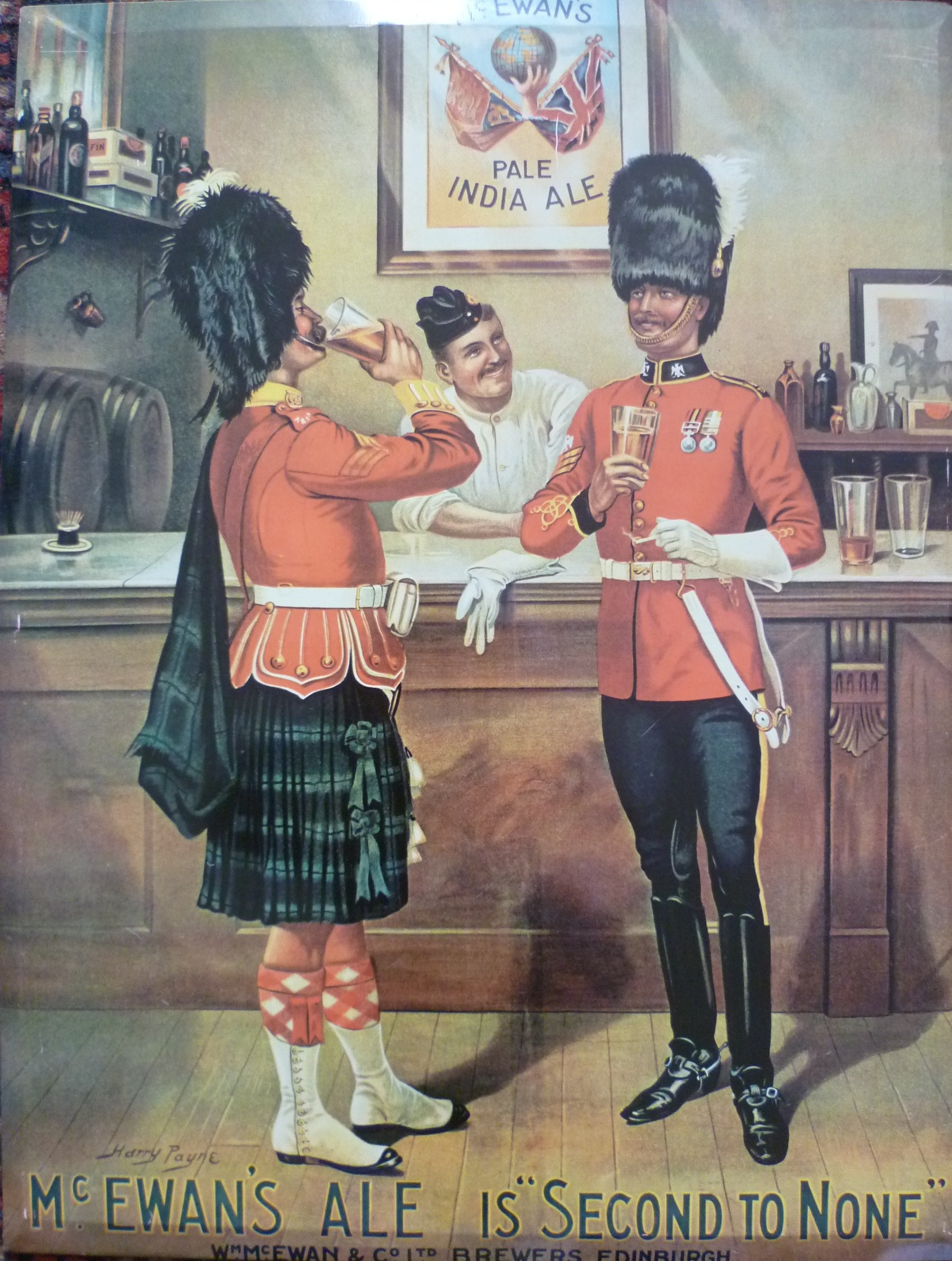
McEwan's advert from 1906

William McEwan opened the Fountain Brewery in Fountainbridge, then a suburb on the outskirts of Edinburgh, in 1856, using £2,000 loaned by his mother and his uncle. The area and the brewery are named after the spring waters from the vicinity, which, in addition to its proximity to the Caledonian railway line and the Union Canal, determined the location of the brewery. McEwan had employed geologists to identify the prime location for a supply of well water. Beforehand, McEwan had engaged in industrial espionage at Bass and Allsopp's breweries in order to learn techniques and assay costs. After establishing a market share in the industrial regions of the Scottish Lowlands, from the early 1860s, McEwan built up a successful colonial export trade by exploiting his family's shipowning connections. It was during this time that McEwan's India Pale Ale, the beer that was the foundation for much of the company's reputation, was first labelled Export.

By the 1870s, McEwan's brewery employed 170 men and boys, and its beers were widely available in England. By 1880, the brewery site covered 12 acres. McEwan's 80/-, a Heavy beer, was first brewed in the late nineteenth century; the shilling "/-" denotion refers to the wholesale price for a hogshead of the beer. In 1886, as he prepared to enter Parliament, William McEwan appointed his nephew, William Younger, as managing director of the brewery. When the company was registered in 1889, it was worth £408,000 and had capital of £1 million; and was the largest brewery in the United Kingdom under a single owner. By the turn of the twentieth century the company had a large share of the market throughout Scotland, a 90% share of the Tyneside market, and was exporting to Scottish expatriates across the British Empire. At its peak, the brewery was producing two million barrels of beer a year, much of it for export.

In 1895, the cargo steamer Wallachia was wrecked while carrying a consignment of McEwan's stout. Several bottles have since been retrieved and analysed; the study found that the beer was at that time brewed with Brettanomyces and Debaryomyces yeasts, rather than the Saccharomyces yeast strains standard in brewing today. Diver Steve Hickman tried the shipwreck beer in the 1980s and reported that it still formed a head, but tasted rotten and salty.

=== Twentieth-century mergers ===
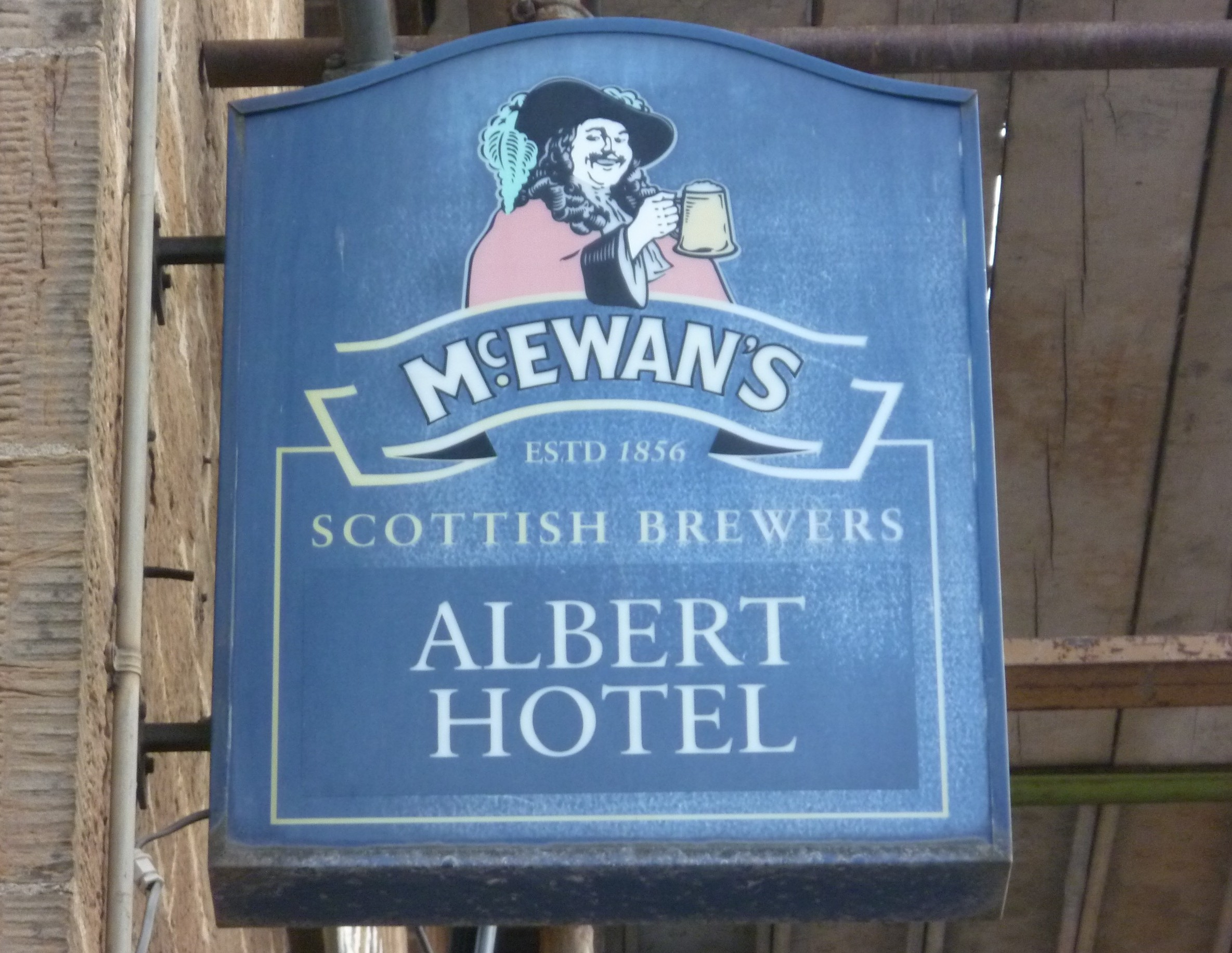
A McEwan's Cavalier pub sign

In 1907, McEwan's acquired the trade and goodwill of Alexander Melvin & Co of central Edinburgh. By 1914, McEwan's bottled beers were distributed across the United Kingdom. In December 1930, McEwan's merged with Edinburgh rival William Younger's Brewery to form Scottish Brewers in a defensive move after the Great Depression diminished revenues. Each entity was initially run separately, and only certain financial and technological resources were amalgamated. During this period, the company became an early pioneer of container beer, largely due to its dependence on exports, particularly to the Royal Navy, where beer might be stored on board ships for up to a year. The NAAFI continued to be an important McEwan's customer throughout the century. In the early-1930s, Jardine Matheson approached the company regarding a potential brewing venture in China, but McEwan's did not welcome the threat to their export business.

The company's export trade declined during and after the Second World War, and as a result, the Abbey Brewery in Edinburgh, previously the Younger's brewery, closed down in 1956 and was converted into offices. By the 1950s, McEwan's had become the dominant party in the McEwan Younger venture, and a full merger was undertaken in 1959. Scottish Brewers continued to increase its market share in the brewing sector, doubling its output after a costly five-year programme of expansion and modernisation undertaken between 1958-63.

The company merged with Newcastle Breweries in 1960, forming Scottish & Newcastle, a group with market value of £50,000,000. William McEwan Younger, the son of William Younger, was the chairman and managing director. The company dedicated itself to the free trade, and promoted its brands to an extent not previously witnessed in the British brewing industry. McEwan's Export became one of the three core brands of the new company, alongside Newcastle Brown Ale and Younger's Tartan Special. Scottish & Newcastle became the dominant force in brewing across Scotland and the North of England. From the 1960s, the company began to style itself MacEwan's in export markets, in order to make pronunciation easier. The company's McEwan's Strong Ale was the highest gravity beer on general sale throughout the world. McEwan's Export was alternatively sold as India Pale Ale or Scotch Ale overseas. William McEwan Younger retired in 1970.

The Fountain Brewery was rebuilt in 1973 and pioneered the use of computer control for the entire brewing process. The site had a 2 million barrel capacity, and occupied 22 acres on a new site which had formerly been occupied by a British Rubber mill. McEwan's Export became a nationally distributed beer by the 1970s, and was the best -selling canned beer in the United Kingdom by 1975. McEwan's Lager was introduced in 1976 as the demand for lager increased, but it struggled to gain credibility until the "Alive and kicking" campaign was launched in 1986. McEwan's Export was launched in the United States in 1989. Two bottled ales were launched, McEwan's Champion Ale (7.3%) in 1997 and McEwan's Parliament Ale (5%) in 1999. In 2000, McEwan's had 13% of the Scottish lager market and around 40% of the Scottish ale market. In 2003 McEwan's 70/- was overtaken by Belhaven Best as Scotland's best-selling ale, and McEwan's Lager was discontinued.

=== Closure of the Fountain Brewery ===
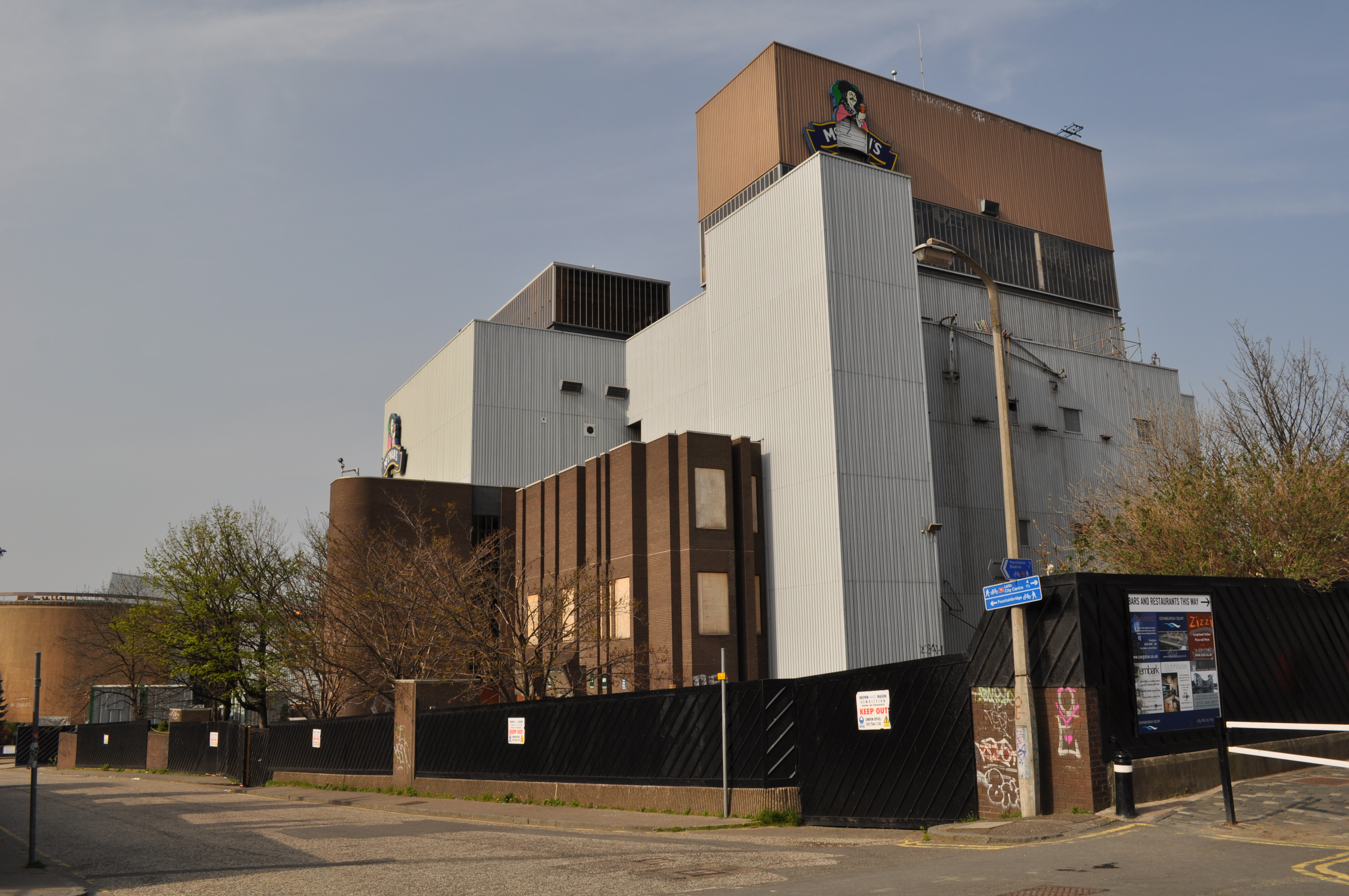
The Fountain Brewery Bottling Plant, demolished in 2011

In February 2004, Scottish & Newcastle announced the closure of the Fountain Brewery. Production costs at Fountainbridge had become twice as high as those at the company's lowest-cost brewery in Tadcaster, North Yorkshire. It closed in June 2005, with the loss of 170 jobs. Production of McEwan's draught beers was transferred to the Caledonian Brewery with cans of McEwan's Export being produced at John Smith's Brewery in Tadcaster. The McEwan's and Younger's brands added around 50,000 barrels to the production of the Caledonian. The last regular batch of the cask-conditioned version of McEwan's 80/- was brewed in 2006 after annual production dropped below 10,000 barrels, although the beer made a brief return in June 2011 and has since been brewed seasonally by W&Y. McEwan's Lager was reintroduced in 2009.

=== Sale to Wells & Young's ===
In October 2011, Heineken sold the McEwan's beer brands to Wells & Young's for around £20 million, and production of McEwan's Best Scotch and canned and bottled brands moved to Bedford. The new owners vowed to reintroduce McEwan's as a cask ale brand and launch an expanded premium bottled range. Together with the Younger's brands McEwan's generated £80,000,000 of sales annually in the UK, with McEwan's the largest Wells & Young's brand. It was the highest-selling ale brand in Scotland where it had a 20% market share. Like most largely pasteurised ale brands in the UK it had been in a state of managed decline. The beers were sold predominantly in Scotland and the north of England; a small amount was exported to Italy. 2012 saw the launch of McEwan's Export in bottles, and a new seasonal cask-conditioned golden ale called McEwan's Gold. In 2013, export sales to Canada were resumed, having been discontinued under Heineken. In April 2013, McEwan's Red was launched, aimed at younger drinkers and with the intention of expanding the brand into England. McEwan's beers began to be sold in France in April 2013. The bottled beers McEwan's Amber and Signature were launched in July 2013.

=== Sale to Marston's ===
In May 2017, Marston's announced that it had acquired the McEwan's brands as part of the acquisition of Charles Wells's brewing interest with cans and bottles continuing to be brewed in Bedford, England. In April 2020, Marston's placed its brewing business, including the McEwan's brands, into a joint venture with Carlsberg.

=== Closure of Caledonian Brewery ===
In May 2022, Heineken announced the closure of its Caledonian Brewery which contract-brewed draught McEwan's in Edinburgh. It said its own Scottish brands would be contract-brewed by Greene King's Belhaven Brewery. There was no announcement on where McEwan's draught would be brewed.

== Current product range ==
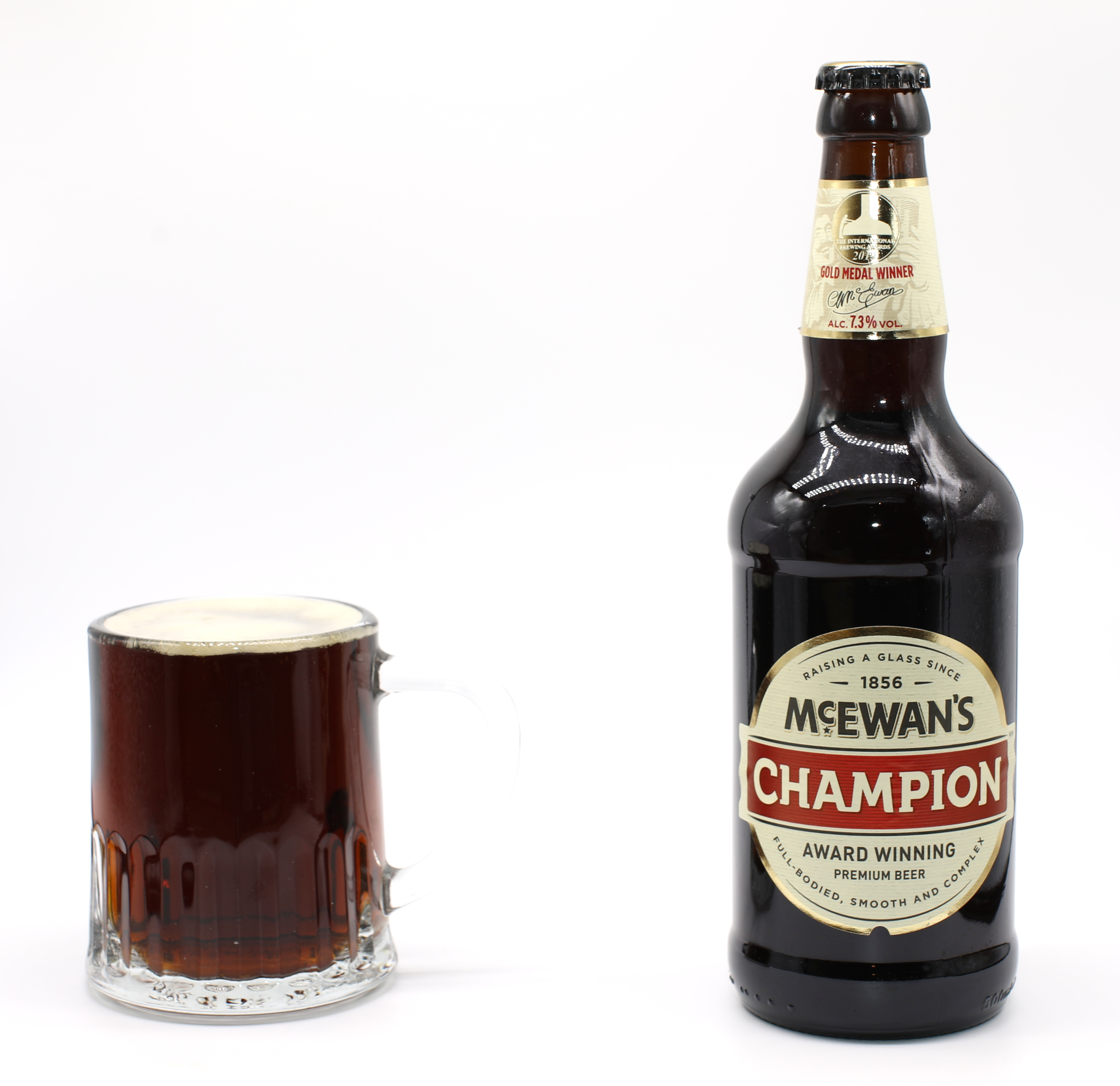
McEwan's Champion Ale

McEwan's 60/- (3.2 per cent ABV)
A beer style known in Scotland as "Light", this dark coloured beer is similar to an English mild ale.
McEwan's Best Scotch (3.6 per cent ABV)
A beer that shares style characteristics with both mild and bitter. It sells 23,000 hectolitres annually. Sales are concentrated in the Tyneside region, and the beer is not found in Scotland. Production was moved from the Tyne Brewery in Newcastle upon Tyne to the Federation Brewery in Gateshead in 2005. The Federation Brewery was closed in 2010, and production of McEwan's Best Scotch was contracted to the Burtonwood Brewery, between Warrington and St Helens, until it moved to Bedford following the Wells & Young's takeover.
McEwan's 70/- (3.7 per cent ABV)
Shares many characteristics with an English session bitter.
McEwan's 80/- (4.2 per cent ABV)
A Heavy, which until 2000 was brewed to 4.5 per cent ABV.
McEwan's Export (4.5 per cent ABV)
The second highest selling canned premium ale in the UK. In cans, it sold over 30,000 hectolitres in 2012. In Scotland it accounts for 83 per cent of the canned premium ale market. Sometimes sold as McEwan's India Pale Ale in overseas markets.
McEwan's Champion Ale (7.3 per cent ABV)
A Burton or Edinburgh ale, a style known locally as "Wee Heavy". Available across the United Kingdom in 500ml bottles, it is one of the top twenty highest selling bottled ales, selling around 7,000 hectolitres in 2012. A stronger version is sold as McEwan's Scotch Ale in export markets. (Note: Historically, various McEwan's products have been sold under the name "McEwan's Scotch Ale'", although most recently this has been an 8 per cent version of Champion Ale.)
McEwan's Lager (3.6 per cent ABV)
McEwan's Red (3.6 per cent ABV)
An ale with a reddish tinge introduced in 2013.

== Advertising ==
McEwan's Scotch Ale (export), with a label used until 2010

Throughout the Victorian period, and into the twentieth century, McEwan's drew heavily from imagery of the British Empire in its branding. The Laughing Cavalier mascot was introduced to the McEwan's brand in the 1930s. Based on the well-known Frans Hals painting, it has been used extensively in advertisements and branding ever since. During the 1960s, and 1970s, McEwan's was advertised as "The best buy in beer".

From the 1970s until the early 1990s McEwan's Best Scotch was marketed in the North East of England as "The one you've got to come back for".

The "alive and kicking" campaign for McEwan's Lager from 1986 until 1997 saw some of the most unique television advertisements yet produced at the time.

=== Sponsorship ===
During the 1980s and 1990s, McEwan's sponsored six football clubs and two rugby league clubs:

- Carlisle United – 1982 to 1988 (McEwan's Younger)
- Darlington – 1984 to 1987
- Rangers – 1987 to 1999 (McEwan's Lager)
- Notts County – 1991 to 1994 (away kit only)
- Blackburn Rovers – 1991 to 1995
- St Helens R.F.C. – 1991 to 1999
- Wakefield Trinity Wildcats – 1993 to 1997
- Newcastle United – 1991 to 1996 (away kit only)

== See also ==
- Beer in Scotland
