= Broughton Ales =

Brewery in Broughton, Scottish Borders

Broughton Ales Ltd.
- Industry: Brewing
- Founded: 1979
- Headquarters: Broughton, Scottish Borders, Scotland, UK
- Products: Bottled beer, cask ale
- Website: broughtonales.co.uk

Broughton Ales is a small independent brewery based in Broughton, Scottish Borders, Scotland.

== History ==
The business was started by James Collins and David Younger in 1979 in a building in Broughton that had previously been an abattoir. The company became insolvent in 1995, and was taken over by Giles Litchfield; in 2015 it again came under new management. In 2018 more than 60% of its beer was for bottling; it also produced some cask ales.
