= Innis & Gunn =

Scottish brewery

Innis & Gunn Brewing Company
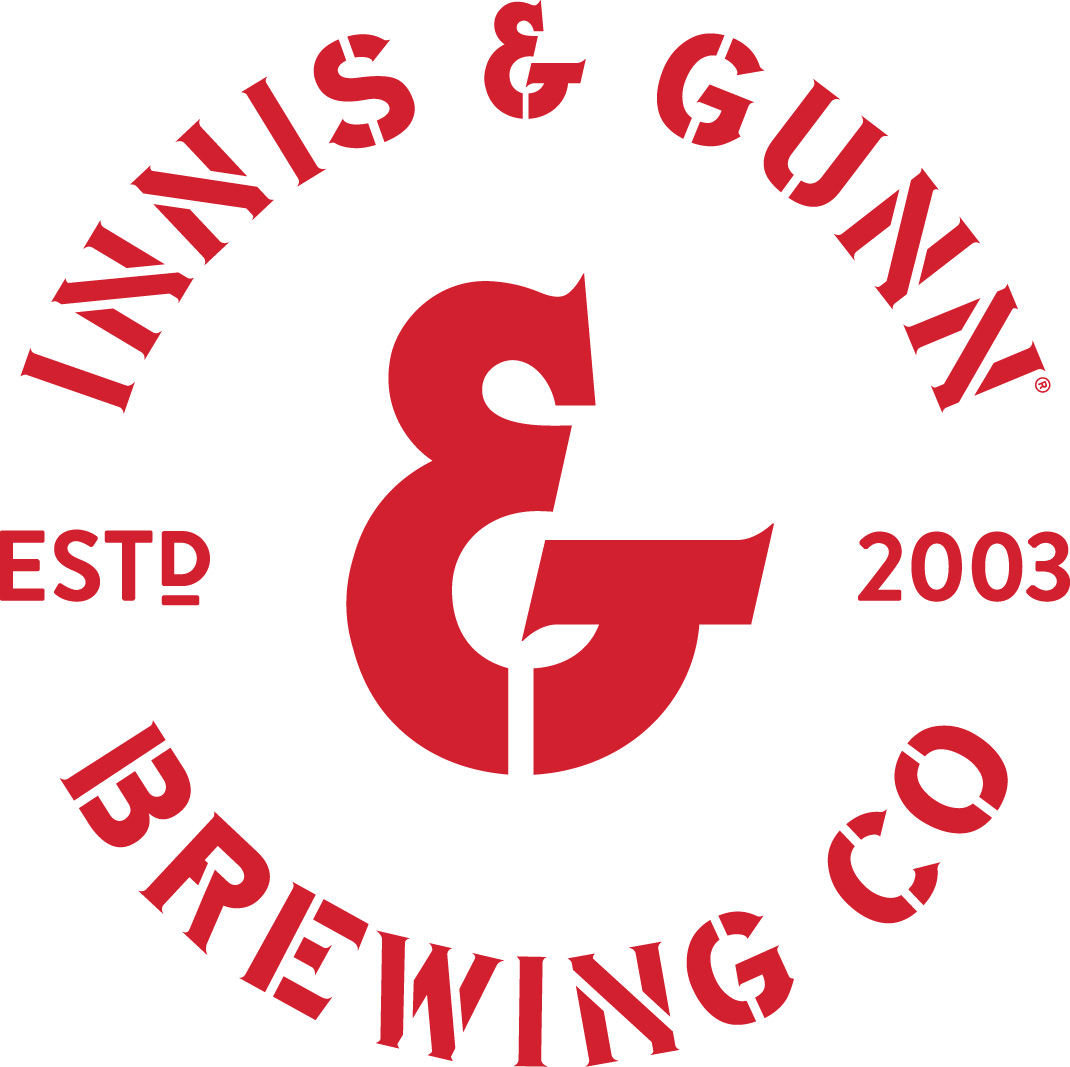
- Location: Edinburgh, Scotland, UK
- Opened: 2003
- Parent: C&C Group
- Website: www.innisandgunn.com

Active beers
Name	Type
The Original	Ale
Blood Red Sky	Red ale
Kindred Spirits	Irish Stout
Innis & Gunn Lager	Lager
Innis & None	Low-alcohol-pale ale
Gunnpowder IPA	India Pale Ale

Innis & Gunn is a Scottish brewery based in Edinburgh, Scotland. It was founded in 2003 by brewer Dougal Gunn Sharp.

== History and operations ==
Founder Dougal Sharp was born in Aberdeen in June 1972. He was raised in Elgin, Moray, before moving to Edinburgh aged 14. The Innis & Gunn name is derived from the middle names of both Sharp and his brother. Sharp's career in alcoholic drinks began at Edinburgh’s Caledonian Brewery, with his father having led the management buy-out of the company in 1987. Sharp founded Innis & Gunn in 2003.

The brewery has contract brewed in Glasgow at Tennent's Wellpark Brewery since 2014 and has been exported to over 35 countries. In 2017, Innis & Gunn sold 2.5 million cases of beer in over 35 countries.

In late 2016, to help grow the company, Innis & Gunn raised £2.4 million through crowdfunding, surpassing its target of £1 million within 72 hours. This allowed them to purchase the Inveralmond Brewery in Perth.

In 2017, the brewery signed a distribution deal in China for its flagship ale 'The Original'.

In March 2026 Innis & Gunn went into administration, with the brand and intellectual property being purchased by Tennent's owners C&C Group, leading to the Perth brewery and all taprooms being shut down and all staff being made redundant.

== Taprooms ==
The first Innis & Gunn Brewery Taproom opened in Edinburgh in the summer of 2015, winning the UK Casual Dining Concept Award in 2016. With a focus on craft beer and seasonal food, it later expanded to Dundee and Glasgow's Ashton Lane, the largest unit opened to date.

== Varieties ==
=== Regular availability ===
- Original - This is the brewery's flagship beer. It is aged using bourbon casks over bourbon-infused heartwood in specialty "Oakerators" It is 6.6% alcohol by volume. At first only available as a bottled beer, it is now marketed in bottles, cans and as draught.
- Blood Red Sky - A replacement to the old rum cask beer, Blood Red Sky is aged using Jamaican rum barrels and is a part of the core range offered by Innis & Gunn. This red beer is 6.8% ABV and is available in bottled and as draught.
- Gunnpowder IPA - This India Pale Ale is 5.6% ABV and is available in cans, bottles and as draught.
- Lager Beer - Innis & Gunn Lager Beer is a craft-brewed lager, 4.6% ABV. Available in cans, bottles and as draught.
- Ossian Golden Ale brewed at Inveralmond Brewery this beer has won the Champion Beer of Scotland. 4.1% ABV. Available in cans, bottles and as draught.

== See also ==
- Barrel-aged beer
