= Caledonian Brewery =

Scottish brewery

Caledonian Brewery Ltd.
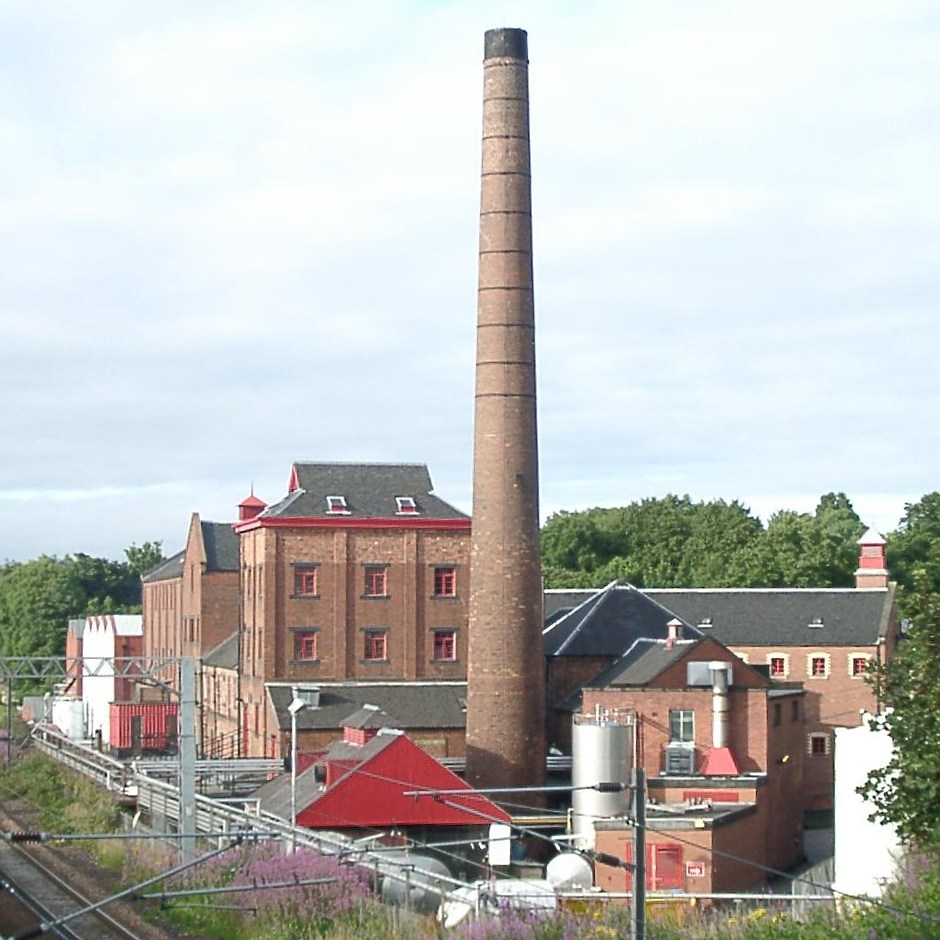
- Industry: Brewing
- Founded: 1869; 157 years ago
- Defunct: 2024
- Headquarters: Edinburgh, Scotland, UK
- Products: Beer
- Owner: Heineken International
- Website: www.caledonianbeer.com

The Caledonian Brewery was a brewery founded in 1869 in the Shandon area of Edinburgh, Scotland. It was acquired by Scottish & Newcastle in 2004 and operated until 2022, when it closed after 153 years of production. The company dissolved in 2024. The site is being developed for housing, with plans approved in 2025. It was locally known as just "the Cally".

== History ==
=== Early years ===
When it was founded in 1869, the brewery was named the Lorimer and Clark Caledonian Brewery, after its founders George Lorimer and Robert Clark.

George Lorimer was just 18 years old when his father (George Lorimer Snr.) died in a fire at Edinburgh's Theatre Royal in 1865. Young George was a keen golfer and member of the Bruntsfield Links Golfing Society - which met at the Golf Tavern and played on the adjacent Bruntsfield Links. It was through spending time at the Golf Tavern that George became friends with many of Edinburgh's leading brewers; including Thomas Aitchison, George Bernard and Robert Clark.

In 1868, George Lorimer came of age and inherited his father's estate. George was determined to use the money to start his own brewery. He enlisted the help of Robert Clark, then Head Brewer at the Alexander Melvin Brewery in Edinburgh and together they opened Lorimer and Clark's Caledonian Brewery on the Slateford Road site. In 1892, to designs by the architect Robert Hamilton Paterson, buildings on the site were re-constructed and new brewery and maltings buildings erected.

Although the brewery sold its beers and a number of stouts all over Scotland, its most popular beer was Lorimer's Best Scotch, which was sold predominantly in the north-east of England.

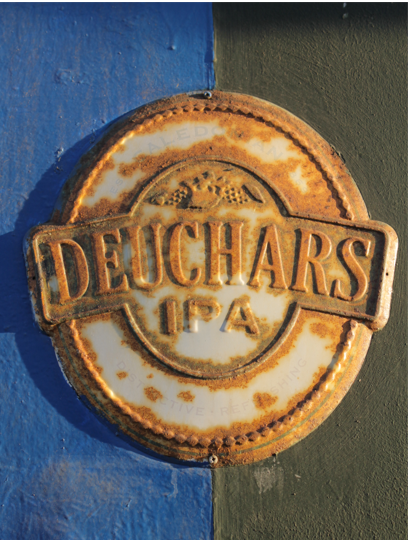
Old promotional Deuchars IPA sign on a 19th century pub on Leith Walk

=== Vaux era ===
On George Lorimer's death in 1939, The Caledonian Brewery passed into the hands of Sunderland-based Vaux Breweries, who developed Lorimer’s Best Scotch brand into one of the most popular beers in the North East of England. In 1986 they decided to cease brewing in Edinburgh and transfer the operation to their base in Sunderland.

Eventually neglect and lack of investment took their toll and placed the brewery under threat of closure. In 1987, the brewery was saved through a management buy-out led by head brewer, Russell Sharp.

=== Scottish & Newcastle era ===
In 2004, the brewery site and production facilities were bought by Scottish & Newcastle (S&N), following their closure of the McEwan's Brewery in Fountainbridge, Edinburgh. Production of McEwan's ales has been transferred to the Caledonian Brewery.

At the same time, a new Caledonian Brewing Company (CBC) was formed by several former shareholders and directors of the pre-2004 business. CBC owned the Caledonian brands and operated the brewery site on behalf of the owners. Whilst S&N took a 30% share in this business, CBC operated on an independent basis.

In January 2006, the Caledonian Brewing Company purchased the Harviestoun Brewery based in Alva, makers of Bitter and Twisted.

In 2008, S&N bought the remaining shares in CBC to take full control of the company. The brands remained unaffected and brewing continued at the site. Harviestoun was not part of the takeover and was retained by Caledonian's shareholders to run as a separate concern. With the takeover of S&N, Heineken controlled the Caledonian Brewery Company.

=== Heineken era and closure ===
In 2008, Heineken acquired the UK assets of Scottish and Newcastle which included the Caledonian Brewery. In May 2022, Heineken announced the proposed closure of the Caledonian Brewery with an agreement in principle for Belhaven Brewery to brew its Scottish brands. Production of Caledonian's brands, including Deuchars, Coast to Coast, and Maltsmiths, would be relocated to the Greene King owned Belhaven Brewery in Dunbar.

In October 2022, JLL was appointed to market the site. It advised the complex had potential for redevelopment into flats, a hotel, or student accommodation. Artisan Real Estate purchased the 1.9 acres (0.77 ha) site for redevelopment of the B-listed Victorian buildings. Plans for 168 flats on the site were approved in May 2025. About a fifth of these will be within the existing buildings, and new buildings will mimic the skyline of the maltings destroyed by fire around 30 years previously.

== Beers ==
Caledonian's most well known beers were Deuchars IPA and 80/- (Now rebadged as Edinburgh Castle). They also brewed Flying Scotsman, four seasonal beers and several monthly guest ales.

Caledonian also produced organic beers Harvest Pale and Golden Promise.
