= Belhaven Brewery =

Brewery based in Belhaven, Dunbar, Scotland

Coordinates: 55°59′35.03″N 2°30′26.31″W

Belhaven
- Company type: Subsidiary
- Industry: Alcoholic drink
- Founded: 1719
- Headquarters: Belhaven, Scotland, UK
- Products: Beer
- Owner: Greene King

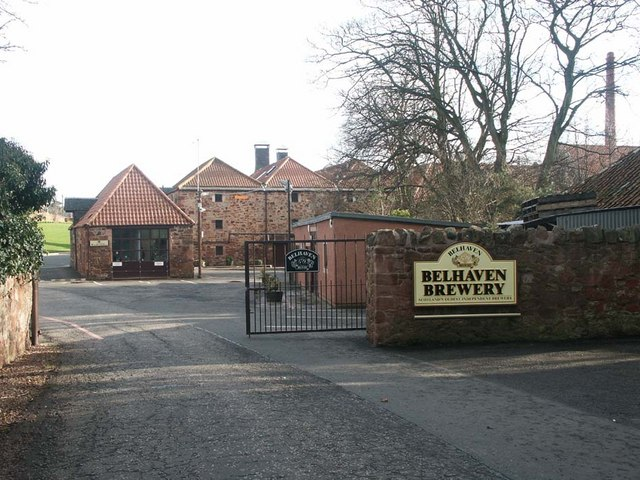
Belhaven Brewery.

Belhaven Brewery is a brewery based in Belhaven, Scotland. The brewery dates from 1719, at least; by 2005 it had become the largest and oldest surviving independent brewery in Scotland. In November 2005, the Suffolk based brewery Greene King completed a £187 million takeover of the company. The brewery complex is designated Category A listed.

== History ==
Belhaven claims to have begun brewing in 1719. In that year the burgh of Dunbar levied a local tax on brewers to fund civic improvements. Since Belhaven's site is immediately outside the limits controlled by the then Dunbar Council, and hence would be free of the 'impost' or tax, it is possible that the 1719 date records the relocation of an existing business. In the first half of the 18th century Belhaven had more than 24 small and large competitors nearby in Dunbar, Belhaven and West Barns. Only three, the Dunbar, Belhaven (then called Johnstone's and later Dudgeon's) and West Barns breweries survived until the middle of the 19th century and only Belhaven lasted through the 20th, in part due to its small scale of production and its much larger malting capacity. The history of brewing in Dunbar, however, goes much further back - all the way to the 1200s with the founding of a site for agriculture, malting and brewing by Benedictine monks who were based on the Isle of May.

The manager's house (which sits to the west side of the approach lane) was built c.1790 but extended several times. It has been detached from the brewery for at least 50 years and is currently under private ownership. Its grounds include a small pedimented folly screening the brewery from the house. Its entrance gates were previously the jaw-bones of a whale (as also found on nearby North Berwick Law) but these have eroded to stumps.

By 2005, Belhaven had become the largest and oldest surviving independent brewery in Scotland. In November 2005, the Suffolk based brewery Greene King completed a £187 million takeover of Belhaven. Greene King stated that Belhaven would retain its brands and brewery following the takeover.

In 2019, the Hong Kong based CK Assets announced the take over of the owner of Belhaven, Greene King. According to the Financial Times, the holding company is taking the view that the pubs owned by Greene King are an asset that is safe from potential recession. Analyst David Blennerhassett told the FT that CK Assets has a track record of buying such assets in the UK and he does not expect it to sell Greene King later as a bet on the falling pound.

== Beers ==
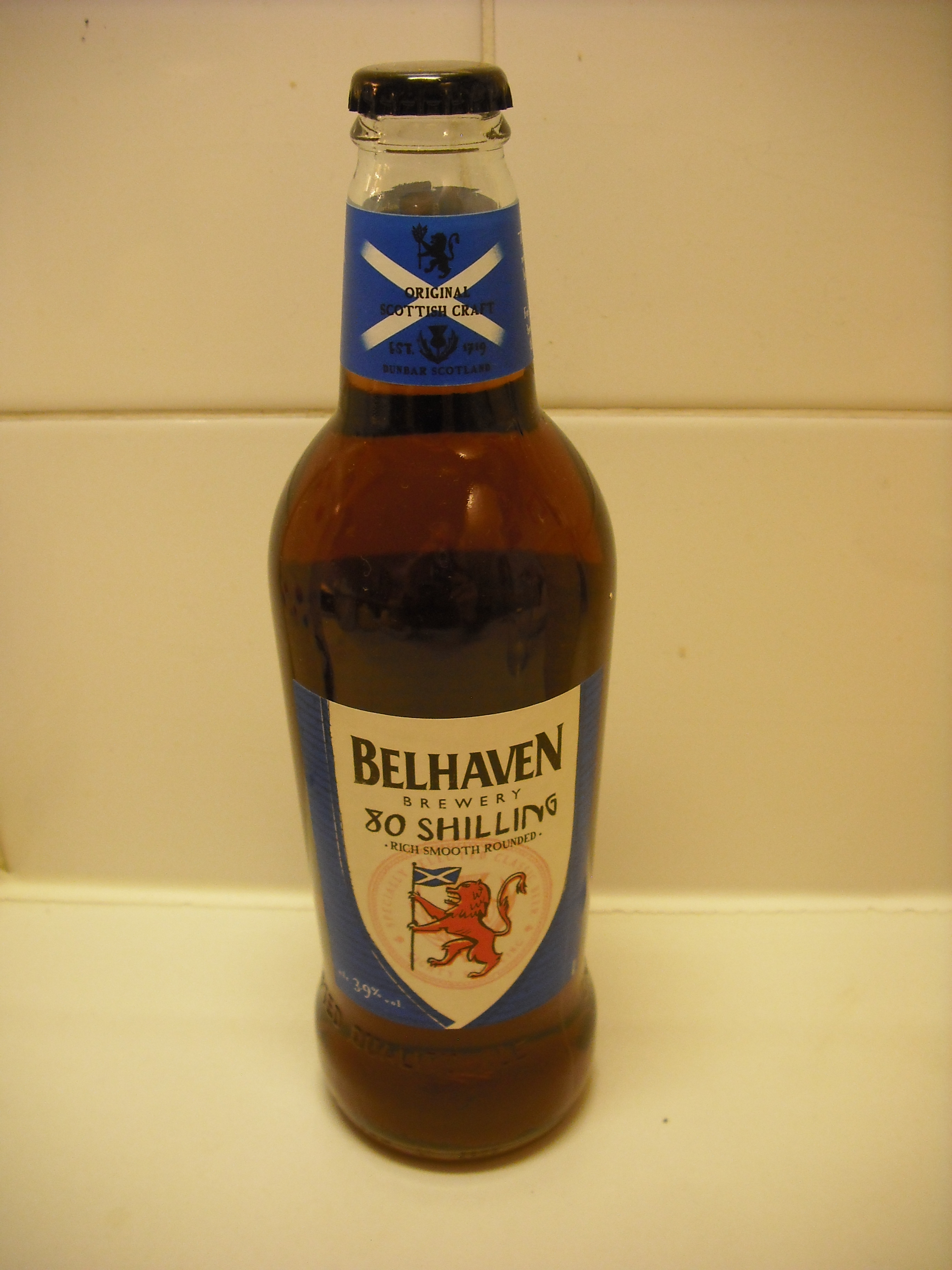
A 500ml bottle of "80 Shilling" beer

Belhaven brew a range of around 20 beers. Belhaven Best is widely distributed in Scotland on draught and in cans. The brewery's range also includes Belhaven Black Scottish Stout, traditional Scottish ales such as 80 Shilling, St Andrew's Amber Ale, Belhaven IPA and Robert Burns Brown Ale; and in 2014 Belhaven launched a range of speciality craft beers including Twisted Thistle IPA, Speyside Oak Aged Blonde Ale, Craft Pilsner, Scottish Oat Stout and Belhaven Scottish Ale.

Launches since 2015 include Intergalactic Dry-Hopped Lager, Bridge to Nowhere Pale Ale and Twisted Grapefruit IPA. Many of these beers are hoppier and often stronger than the more traditional beers historically associated with Belhaven. In the past, stouts, porters, brown ales, 20/- to 110/- ales (rising at 10/- increments) as well as periodic specials celebrating anniversaries and royal events were brewed at Belhaven. Even further back, harvest ales and 2d ales were the brewery's standby.

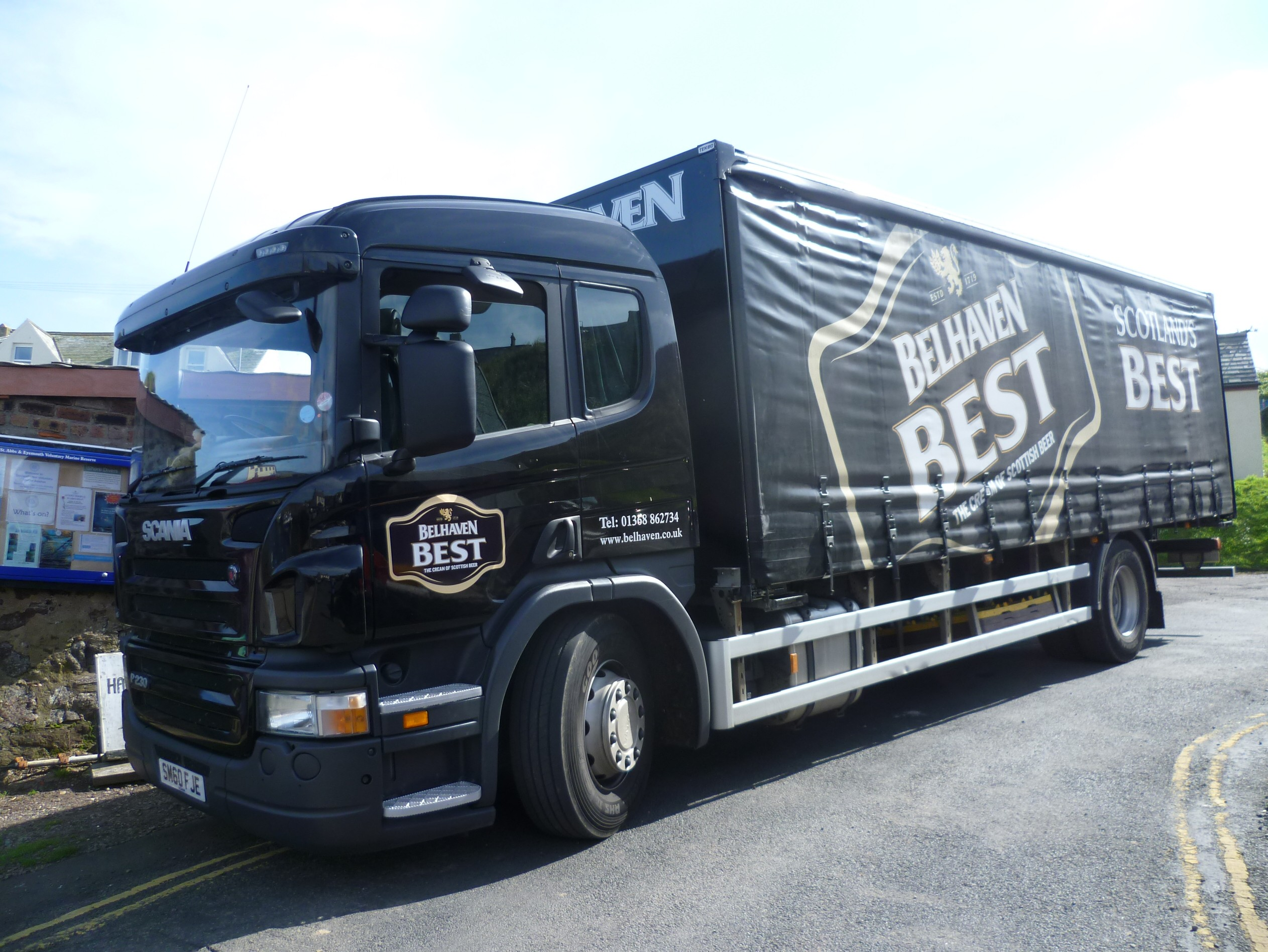
Belhaven Brewery lorry

A new brewhouse was installed at the ancient brewery in 2012. The old mash tun was replaced with a mash conversion vessel and lauter-tun system, which broadens the beer styles that can be brewed there, in particular opening up the possibility of brewing lagers as well as ales. The brewhouse was officially opened by Princess Anne on 18 January 2013.

== Pubs ==
The brewery also has a managed pubs business, with over 150 pubs operating under the Belhaven Pubs brand.

== Sports sponsorship ==
Belhaven sponsored Dundee United for six seasons between 1987 and 1993.

== Innis & Gunn ==
Innis & Gunn is an oak-aged beer which was brewed and bottled under contract by Belhaven for Innis & Gunn until 2011.

== Belhaven Bursary ==
Since 2018 the company has awarded The Belhaven Bursary for Innovation in Scottish Music annually, with the winner being announced as part of the Scots Trad Music Awards. The prize consists of £25,000, an ale brewed with the winner's name on it, an appearance at an event at Tartan Week in New York and the use of the winner's music in an advertising campaign. The cash prize is the largest music prize in Scotland, matched only by the Mercury Prize.

=== Bursary Winners ===
- 2018 (inaugural award) - Elephant Sessions
- 2018 - Talisk
- 2019 - Kinnaris Quintet
