= Food and drink industry in Wales =

The food and drink industry in Wales is the sector of the Welsh economy consisting of food and soft drink companies as well as distilleries and breweries in Wales. The food and drink sector is classed as a priority economic sector in Wales. It involves 170,000 people that contribute to gross sales of £17.3 billion.

== Alcohol ==
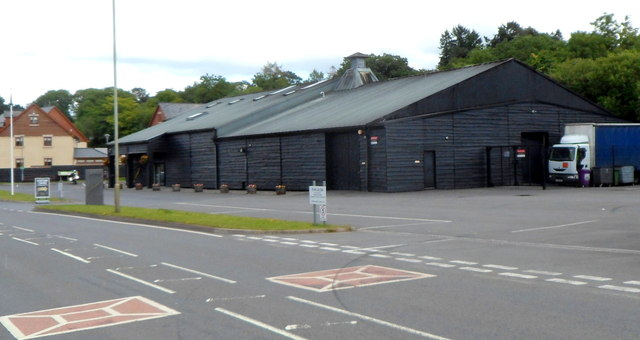
Penderyn Distillery and Visitor Centre, Penderyn, Rhondda Cynon Taf

=== Boss Brewing ===
Boss Brewing is a craft brewery in Swansea, South Wales, founded in 2014 by husband and wife Sarah and Roy Allkin. In May 2015 the brewery received a Society of Independent Brewers Gold Award and was awarded CAMRA's Champion Beer of Wales award for its stout in 2019.

=== Bragdy Nant ===
Bragdy Nant is an ale brewery near the town of Llanrwst, North Wales. The brewery produces cask and bottle-conditioned ales, and is one of four North Wales breweries jointly operating the Albion Ale House in the town of Conwy. The name Bragdy Nant is Welsh for River or Stream Brewery. Bragdy Nant's dark ale Mwnci Nel was awarded silver in CAMRA's 2010 Champion Beer of Wales competition. The brewery has also produced an ale for the nearby Plas y Brenin mountaineering centre in Capel Curig.

=== Brains ===
Brains is a regional brewery based in Cardiff, Wales. It was founded in 1882 by Samuel Arthur Brain. The company controls more than 250 pubs in South Wales (particularly in Cardiff), Mid Wales and the West Country. The company took over Crown Buckley Brewery in Llanelli in 1997 and Hancock's Brewery in 1999. In 2000, Brains moved to the former Hancock's Brewery just south of Cardiff Central railway station. The Old Brewery, in Cardiff city centre, has been developed into a modern bar and restaurant complex. The company produces a range of beers under the Brains, Buckley's and Hancock's names. As part of their marketing strategy, Brains use shirt sponsorship for the Wales national rugby union team and the Crusaders Rugby League team. It is the largest private sector employer is the Cardiff brewer and pub owner Brains Brewery, which employs nearly 1,800 people.

=== Evan Evans ===
Evan Evans is a brewery in Llandeilo, Carmarthenshire, Wales.The brewery was founded by Simon Buckley in 2004. In 2014 the brewery company incorporated as Evan-Evans Group Ltd. and launched the Porter Street Brewing Company, a brewer of cask ale in London.

=== Felinfoel Brewery ===
Felinfoel Brewery is a brewery based in the village of Felinfoel near Llanelli, Carmarthenshire, Wales. The existing brewery building dates from 1878 (according to a date plaque on its south facade), constructed by local innkeeper (and iron and tinplate works owner) David John. The brewery grew to employ fifty people and expanded its market to the surrounding counties. After John's retirement his sons took over the business and, in 1906, it was registered as a limited company. In the 1920s the company was managed by John's daughter, Mary Anne Lewis, a formidable woman who always carried a big stick. In 1935 Felinfoel became the first brewery in the UK (and one of the first breweries in Europe) to produce beer in cans.

=== Hurns Brewing Company Ltd. (Tomos Watkin) ===
The Hurns Brewing Company Limited is a drinks and brewery company based in Swansea, Wales, United Kingdom. Hurns own several pubs in Wales. It acquired the Tomos Watkin range of beers in 2002.

=== Penderyn ===
Penderyn produces single malt whiskies and spirits at their distillery in Brecon Beacons National Park, Wales.

=== Tiny Rebel ===
Tiny Rebel beers are available in cask, keg, bottle and can. The company is known for its Cwtch (rhyming with "butch" and meaning "cuddle" in Welsh), having won Supreme Supreme Champion Beer of Britain with it, in its cask ale format, in 2015. Core ranges of each package are available all year round, with specials and seasonals released intermittently. In 2016, Tiny Rebel released 30 new beers. The company's beers are sold throughout the UK, with selected products available in Welsh branches of supermarkets Co-op and Marks & Spencer. Around 15% of the company's beer is exported, with Australia, Japan, Norway and Sweden being the largest overseas markets.

=== Tudor Brewery ===
Tudor Brewery is a microbrewery in Llanhilleth, Blaenau Gwent, Wales. In 2016, the company's Black Rock Ale won the CAMRA award for Champion Beer of Wales.

=== Wrexham Lager ===
Wrexham Lager is a brewery in Wrexham, north-east Wales, that has produced alcoholic drinks for more than 120 years. A new hi-tech brewery opened in 2011 in the heart of Wrexham, after the original closed in 2000. The original brewery was demolished between 2002 and 2003. Only the historic building in which brewing started still remains. Wrexham lager made a comeback on 29 October 2011 at the Buck House Hotel in Bangor-on-Dee, Wrexham. The Roberts family who restarted WXM Lager are using the same ingredients as those from which it was originally brewed.

== Other drinks ==
=== Tŷ Nant (water) ===
Tŷ Nant is a mineral water brand bottled at source in Bethania, Ceredigion, Wales. Tŷ Nant is Welsh for "House by the stream".

=== Lurvills Delight (soft drink) ===
Lurvills Delight was a popular carbonated soft drink in Wales between 1896 and 1910. Invented by twin brother residents of Ynyshir Harold and Iolo Lewis in 1895, the carbonated mixture included stinging nettles and Dock leaves and was infused with Juniper berry extract. The profits made from the drink were used to pay for 150 coal miners and their families from the village to emigrate to Pittsburgh and Denver in the United States. The drink ceased production in 1910 due to a shortage of Dock leaves in the local area. Delight was brought back in September 2016 by Lurvills Delight Ltd with The Original Botanical Blend bottled soft drink going back into production in Wales.

== Food industry ==
=== Brace's Bakery ===
Brace's is a Crumlin-based Welsh bakery and bakery products brand. Braces Bakery started exporting their bread to Europe in 2011 through international export company, Foodlynx. The exports of Braces Bread grew dramatically in 2012. Braces Bread can now be found in Spain, Portugal, Malta, Greece and Cyprus and is distributed to many hotels and restaurants by European Foodservice Companies as well as being sold in European supermarkets.

=== Cadwalader's ===
Today, Cadwalader's stores can be found in Wales at Betws-y-Coed, Barry Island, Criccieth, Porthmadog, Tenby and three stores in Cardiff. There is also a store in England at Trentham Gardens. As well as the original Cadwalader's vanilla ice cream and a variety of flavoured ice creams and sundaes, the café also sells its own bespoke blends of coffee, loose leaf tea, and other hot drinks.

=== Clark's Pies ===
Clark's Pies, also colloquially nicknamed "Clarkies" or "Clarksies," are well-known meat pies that originated in Cardiff, and can now be found in Bristol and the South of Wales.

=== Euro Foods ===
Euro Foods (UK) Ltd is a UK-based food distribution company, which makes and supplies ethnic food. The company was founded in 1993 by Shelim Hussain, its headquarters is in the city of Cwmbran, South Wales, and has over 2,400 employees.

=== Filco Foods ===
Filco Foods is an independent grocery chain based in Llantwit Major, Vale of Glamorgan, Wales. As of 2013, Filco has 8 stores and operates as part of the Nisa group. Filco Foods was founded by Phillip Jones in 1946. The original location opened on Wine Street in Llantwit Major in 1946. Goods were packaged and delivered according to the customer shopping lists. In 2010 the company celebrated its 65th anniversary with a charity drive.

=== Finsbury Food ===
Finsbury Food is the largest single food industry employer in the Welsh private sector with 850 employees in Cardiff.

=== Michton (chocolate) ===
Michton is the largest chocolate factory in Wales. Created in 1991 by Michelle and Tony Wadley in Enfield, Middlesex, in 1998 the company relocated to Swansea, South Wales. In 2003, Michton opened to the public. In 2008, it was announced that they had been chosen to supply the Rugby Football Union with a range of official chocolate.

=== Peter's Food Service ===
Peter's Food Service is a Bedwas, Wales based baker and supplier of pies, pasties, slices, sausage rolls and factored products into retail, food service, catering and hospitality outlets across the United Kingdom. Today it is one of the largest employers in Wales, and one of the largest cold meat distributors in the United Kingdom.

=== Pot Noodle ===
Pot Noodle is manufactured in Croespenmaen, near Crumlin, Caerphilly, Wales, which became the topic of an advertising campaign of 2006, showing fictitious Pot Noodle mines in Wales. The factory typically produces 175 million pots annually.

=== Rachel's Organic (yoghurt) ===
Rachel's Organic is an organic dairy products company based in Aberystwyth, Wales. Founded by local farmers but now a subsidiary of French company Lactalis, it was the United Kingdom's first certified organic dairy.

=== Real Crisps ===
Real Crisps (often stylized as REAL Crisps) is a crisp (potato chip) brand. The company was founded in 1997, and expanded over the following decade to become a business turning over £15 million a year. In 2007, it was purchased by the Northern Ireland-based crisp manufacturer Tayto. In 2012, a fire caused the destruction of the 65,000 square feet (6,000 m^{2}) Real Crisp factory in Crumlin, Caerphilly. There are a range of flavours produced, and the company ran a limited edition political themed range prior to the 2010 United Kingdom general election.
