= Beer in Wales =

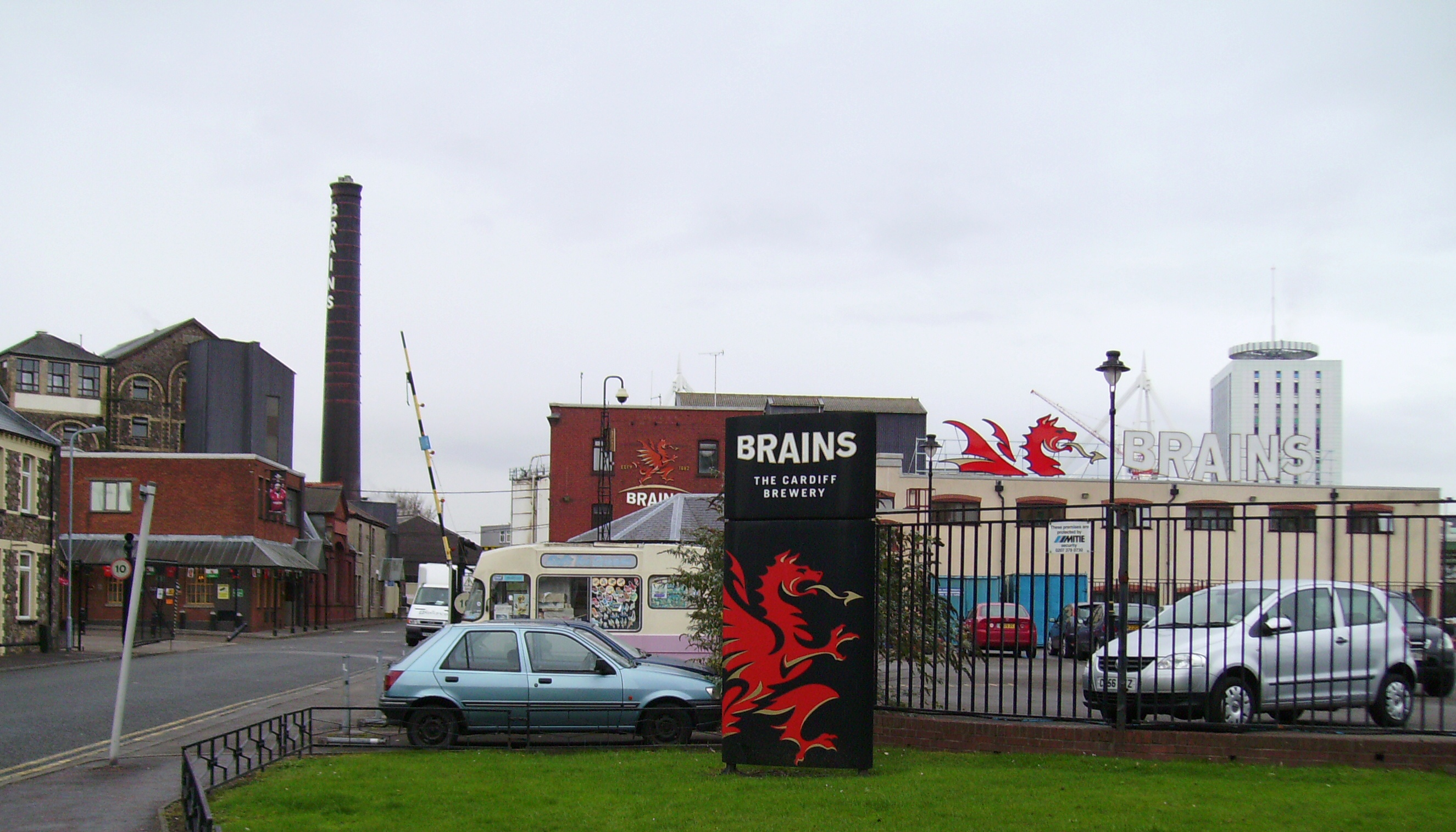
The SA Brain Brewery in Cardiff: the second largest brewery in Wales.

Beer in Wales can be traced to the 6th century. Since the 2000s, there has been a growing microbrewery industry in Wales.

== History ==
At least as early as the 6th century, the Druidic legendary person Ceridwen is associated with cauldrons and intoxicating preparations of grain in herbs in many poems of Taliesin, particularly the Hanes Taliesin. This preparation, Gwîn a Bragawd, is said to have brought "science, inspiration and immortality".

The Welsh Triads attribute the introduction of brewing grains barley and wheat to Coll, and name Llonion in Pembrokeshire as the source of the best barley, while Maes Gwenith in Gwent produces superior wheat and bees.

The Anglo-Saxon Chronicle for 852 records a distinction between "fine ale" and Welsh ale, also called bragawd. Bragawd, also called braggot, is somewhat between mead and what we today think of as ale. Saxon-period Welsh ale was a heady, strong beverage, made with spices such as cinnamon, ginger and clove as well as herbs and honey. Bragawd was often prepared in monasteries, with Tintern Abbey and the Friary of Carmarthen producing the beverage until Henry VIII dissolved the monasteries in 1536. The drink is said to have been still in production by a few families in Wales at the beginning of the 19th century.

In the Laws of Hywel Dda, meanwhile, a distinction is drawn between bragawd and cwrwf, with bragawd being worth twice as much. Bragawd in this context is a fermented drink based on cwrwf to which honey, sweet wort, and ginger have been added.

John Gerard's Herball or Generall Historie of Plantes of 1633 says of the plant ground-ivy: "The women of our Northerne parts, especially about Wales and Cheshire, do turne the herbe Ale-hoof into their Ale; but the reason thereof I know not...".

Alexander Morrice mentions "Welch Ale" in his Treatise on Brewing (1802). The beer was made from pale malt, hops, sugar and grains of paradise. The author says that he saw the brewing process in Carnarvon, conducted by an old women.

Welsh beer is noted as a distinct style as late as 1854, with a recipe made solely from pale malt and hops described in a recipe book of the time.

Wales, along with the rest of Britain, came under the influence of the temperance movement, along with a burgeoning Welsh moral code based on Presbyterian and other Non-conformist beliefs in relation to alcohol. This rested against a background of places where there has historically been abundant heavy industry such as coal mining in south Wales and the north east.

Wrexham was one of the first places in the UK to brew lager. Homesick German immigrant brothers from Saxony started the process in 1882. Its demise came in 2000, when the site of Wrexham Lager was sold and subsequently demolished.

Investment by the Welsh Development Agency has helped establish a large number of breweries in Wales in recent years.

In the 1930s, Felinfoel Brewery was the first brewery in the UK to produce and sell beer in cans.

The largest brewer and packager of beer in Wales by far is the Budweiser Brewing Group (BBG) Brewery in Magor. The brewery was built in 1979 by the Whitbread brewing group and is now operated by the Budweiser Brewing Group, part of AB-InBev the world's largest brewer. The brewery is one of the largest in the UK producing over 5 Million hectare litres every year.

In 2012, CAMRA predicted that the number of microbreweries in Wales is set to carry on rising as the pub industry deals with continued closures.

Tiny Rebel brewery won CAMRA's 2015 Supreme Champion Beer of Britain for its Cwtch Welsh Red Ale.

== List of notable Welsh breweries ==
Brewers in Wales
Brewery	Town/City	Principal area	Since
Beech Avenue Brewery	Wrexham	Wrexham	2020
Bluestone Brewing	Newport	Pembrokeshire	2013
Borough Brewery	Neath	Neath Port Talbot	2014
Boss Brewing	Swansea	Swansea	2015
Bragdy Nant Brewery	Llanrwst	Conwy	2007
Brains Brewery	Cardiff	Cardiff	1882
Breconshire Brewery	Brecon	Powys	2002
Bryncelyn Brewery	Ystalyfera	Neath Port Talbot	1999
Bullmastiff Brewery	Cardiff	Cardiff	1987
Cader Ales (Cwrw Cader)	Dolgellau	Gwynedd	2013
Caffle Brewery	Narberth	Pembrokeshire	2013
Celt Experience	Caerphilly	Caerphilly	2007
Cerddin Brewery	Maesteg	Bridgend	2010
Coles Family Brewery	Llanddarog	Carmarthenshire	1999
Conwy Brewery	Llysfaen	Conwy	2003
Crafty Devil	Cardiff	Cardiff	2014
Cwrw Iâl Community Brewing Company	Eryrys	Denbighshire	2013
Cwrw Llŷn	Pwllheli	Gwynedd	2011
Deva Craft Beer	Deeside	Flintshire	2015
Erddig Brewery	Wrexham	Wrexham	2014
Evan Evans	Llandeilo	Carmarthenshire	2004
Facer's Flintshire Brewery	Flint Mountain	Flintshire	2006
Felinfoel Brewery	Felinfoel	Carmarthenshire	1878
Geipel Brewing	Llangwm	Conwy	2013
Glamorgan Brewing	Llantrisant	Rhondda Cynon Taf	1994
Gower Brewery	Oldwalls	Swansea	2011
Great Orme Brewery	Llandudno	Conwy	2009
Grey Trees Brewery	Aberaman	Rhondda Cynon Taf	2011
Hafod Brewing Company	Mold	Flintshire	2011
Handmade Beer Company	Capel Dewi	Carmarthenshire	2013
Heavy Industry Brewing	Henllan	Denbighshire	2012
Hurns Brewing Company	Swansea	Swansea	2002
Jacobi Brewery of Caio	Pumsaint	Carmarthenshire	2007
Kingstone Brewery	Tintern	Monmouthshire	2006
Llangollen Brewery	Llangollen	Denbighshire	2010
Monty's Brewery	Montgomery	Powys	2009
Mountain Hare Brewery	Pencoed	Bridgend	2013
Mumbles Brewery	Swansea	Swansea	2013
Neath Ales	Neath	Neath Port Talbot	2010
Otley Brewing Company	Pontypridd	Rhondda Cynon Taf	2005
Pen-lon Cottage Brewery	New Quay	Ceredigion	2004
Pipes	Cardiff	Cardiff	2008
Plassey Brewery (Now Magic Dragon Brewing)	Bangor-on-Dee	Wrexham	1985
Preseli Brewery	Tenby	Pembrokeshire	2010
Purple Moose Brewery	Porthmadog	Gwynedd	2005
Radnorshire Ales	New Radnor	Powys	2012
Rotters Brewery	Talgarth	Powys	2010
Rhymney Brewery	Blaenavon	Torfaen	2005
Snowdonia Brewery (Bragdy Eryri)	Waunfawr	Gwynedd	2004
Swansea Brewery	Swansea	Swansea	1996
Tiny Rebel Brewing Co.	Rogerstone	Newport	2012
Tomos & Lilford Brewery	Llantwit Major	Vale of Glamorgan	2014
Tomos Watkin (trade name of Hurns Brewing Company)	Swansea	Swansea	1996
Treboom Brewery (changed ownership and moved to Wales in 2022))	Bagillt	Flintshire	2022
Tudor Brewery	Llanhilleth	Blaenau Gwent	2007
Untapped Brewing Company	Raglan	Monmouthshire	2009
Vale of Glamorgan Brewery	Barry	Vale of Glamorgan	2005
Violet Cottage Brewery	Cardiff	Cardiff	2012
Waen Brewery	Llanidloes	Powys	2009
Warcop Ales	Wentlooge	Newport	1999
Wild Horse Brewing	Llandudno	Conwy	2015
Wrexham Lager	Wrexham	Wrexham	1882–2000
Wrexham Lager	Wrexham	Wrexham	2011 (revived)
Zerodegrees	Cardiff	Cardiff	2008

== See also ==
- Food and drink industry of Wales
- Champion Beer of Wales
- Beer and breweries by region
- Beer in the United Kingdom
- Welsh cuisine
- English beer
- Beer in Northern Ireland
- Scottish beer
- Irish beer
