= List of companies of Wales =

Location of Wales

This is the list of all notable companies that are based in Wales.

== Notable firms ==
This list includes notable companies with primary headquarters located in the country. The industry and sector follow the Industry Classification Benchmark taxonomy. Organizations which have ceased operations are included and noted as defunct.

Notable companies Status: P=Private, S=State; A=Active, D=Defunct
Name	Industry	Sector	Headquarters	Founded	Notes	Status	
Admiral Group	Financials	Full line insurance	Cardiff	1991	Vehicle insurance	P	A
Air Wales	Consumer services	Airlines	Cardiff	1997	Airline, defunct 2006	P	D
Anglesey Aluminium	Basic materials	Aluminium	Holyhead	1971	Aluminium, defunct 2009	P	D
Ankst	Consumer services	Broadcasting & entertainment	Cardiff	1988	Record label	P	A
Arriva Trains Wales	Consumer services	Travel & tourism	Cardiff	2003	Passenger rail, owned by Arriva, defunct 2018	P	D
Avon Inflatables	Consumer goods	Recreational products	Dafen	1959	Inflatable boats, part of Zodiac Nautic (France)	P	A
Bank of Wales	Financials	Banks	Cardiff	1971	Bank, part of Lloyds Banking Group, Defunct 2002	P	D
Bank of Williams and Rowland	Financials	Banks	Neath	1821	Bank, defunct 1836	P	D
BBC Cymru Wales	Consumer services	Broadcasting & entertainment	Cardiff	1964	Broadcaster, part of the BBC	S	A
Black Boy Inn	Consumer services	Hotels	Caernarfon	1522	Hotel	P	A
Brace's Bakery	Consumer goods	Food products	Crumlin	1902	Bakery	P	A
Brains Brewery	Consumer goods	Brewers	Cardiff	1882	Brewery	P	A
Breconshire Brewery	Consumer goods	Brewers	Brecon	2002	Brewery, defunct 2014	P	D
Buy as You View	Consumer services	Broadline retailers	Bridgend	1972	Home and electronics retailer, defunct 2019	P	D
Cadwalader's Ice Cream	Consumer services	Restaurants & bars	Cardiff	1927	Ice cream	P	A
Cambrian Airways	Consumer services	Airlines	Cardiff	1935	Airline, defunct 1976	P	D
Cardiff Bus	Consumer services	Travel & tourism	Leckwith	1902	Bus services	P	A
Cardiff Waterbus	Consumer services	Travel & tourism	Cardiff	2000	Water transport services	P	A
Celtic Manor Resort	Consumer services	Hotels	Newport	1982	Resort	P	A
Clark's Pies	Consumer goods	Food products	Cardiff	1909	Pies and confections	P	A
Corona	Consumer goods	Soft drinks	Porth	1874	Defunct soft drink	P	D
Dee Valley Water	Utilities	Water	Rhostyllen	1863	Water supplier	P	A
Dŵr Cymru Welsh Water	Utilities	Water	Cardiff	1989	Water supplier	P	A
Dyfed Steels	Basic materials	Iron & steel	Llanelli	1976	Steel	P	A
Edwards Coaches	Consumer services	Travel & tourism	Llantwit Fardre	1925	Bus services	P	A
Felinfoel Brewery	Consumer goods	Brewers	Llanelli	1870s	Brewery	P	A
Ffestiniog Railway	Consumer services	Travel & tourism	Porthmadog	1836	Passenger rail, now tourist attraction	P	A
Fflach	Consumer services	Broadcasting & entertainment	Cardigan	1981	Record label	P	A
Filco Foods	Consumer services	Food retailers & wholesalers	Llantwit Major	1946	Grocery chain	P	A
First Cymru	Consumer services	Travel & tourism	Swansea	1995	Bus services, part of FirstGroup (Scotland)	P	A
Gelert	Consumer goods	Recreational products	Widnes	1975	Outdoor equipment	P	A
George Hotel, Chepstow	Consumer services	Hotels	Chepstow	1899	Hotel	P	A
GHA Coaches	Consumer services	Travel & tourism	Ruabon	1990	Bus services, defunct 2016	P	D
Gilbern	Consumer goods	Automobiles	Llantwit Fardre	1959	Automobiles, defunct 1973	P	D
Gocompare.com	Financials	Insurance brokers	Newport	2006	Financial comparisons	P	A
Goitre Tower Anthracite	Basic materials	Coal	Hirwaun	1864	Wales' last coal pit, defunct 2008	P	D
Gomer Press	Consumer services	Publishing	Llandysul	1892	Publisher	P	A
Gwasg Carreg Gwalch	Consumer services	Publishing	Llanrwst	1980	Publisher	P	A
Heart Wales	Consumer services	Broadcasting & entertainment	Cardiff	2000	Radio	P	A
Hilton Cardiff	Consumer services	Hotels	Cardiff	1947	Hotel, part of Hilton Hotels & Resorts (US)	P	A
Hodge Bank	Financials	Banks	Cardiff	1987	Bank	P	A
Howies	Consumer goods	Clothing & accessories	Carmarthen	1995	Clothing manufacturers	P	A
Hurns Brewing Company	Consumer goods	Brewers	Swansea	1995	Brewery	P	A
Hyder	Utilities	Multiutilities	Cardiff	1996	Defunct utility, bought by Western Power Distribution	P	D
Hypervalue	Consumer services	Broadline retailers	Merthyr Tydfil	1980	Retailer, defunct 2006	P	D
Iceland	Consumer services	Food retailers & wholesalers	Deeside	1970	Supermarket	P	A
Ifor Williams Trailers	Industrials	Commercial vehicles & trucks	Corwen	1958	Trailers	P	A
Inexus	Industrials	Heavy construction	Cardiff	2005	Infrastructure	P	A
ITV Cymru Wales	Consumer services	Broadcasting & entertainment	Cardiff	2014	Television, part of ITV	P	A
ITV Wales & West	Consumer services	Broadcasting & entertainment	Cardiff	1968	Television, became part of ITV	P	D
Leekes	Consumer services	Broadline retailers	Talbot Green	1897	Department stores	P	A
Lloyds Coaches	Consumer services	Travel & tourism	Machynlleth	2001	Bus services	P	A
Loyn & Co	Industrials	Business support services	Penarth	1987	Architects	P	A
Lurvills Delight	Consumer goods	Soft drinks	Ynyshir	1896	Soft drink, defunct 1910	P	D
Media Wales	Consumer services	Publishing	Cardiff	1869	Publishing	P	A
Michton	Consumer goods	Food products	Swansea	1998	Chocolate factory	P	A
Moneysupermarket.com	Financials	Investment services	Ewloe	1993	Price comparison website	P	A
Monmouthshire Building Society	Financials	Banks	Newport	1869	Bank and building society	P	A
Monnow Valley Studio	Consumer services	Broadcasting & entertainment	Rockfield	1975	Recording studio	P	A
Nation Broadcasting	Consumer services	Broadcasting & entertainment	Cowbridge	1999	Radio	P	A
National Welsh Omnibus Services	Consumer services	Travel & tourism	Cardiff	1929	Operated in southeast Wales 1929 to 1992	P	D
Newport Bus	Consumer services	Travel & tourism	Newport	1901	Bus services	P	A
Padarn Bus	Consumer services	Travel & tourism	Llanberis	1979	Bus services, defunct 2014	P	D
Peacocks	Consumer services	Apparel retailers	Cardiff	1884	Fashion retailer	P	A
Penderyn Distillery	Consumer goods	Distillers & vintners	Penderyn	2004	Whiskey	P	A
Percy Thomas Partnership	Industrials	Business support services	Cardiff	1912	Architects, defunct 2004	P	D
Peter's Food Services	Consumer goods	Food products	Bedwas	1971	Bakery	P	A
Placid Casual	Consumer services	Broadcasting & entertainment	Cardiff	1998	Record label	P	A
Plas Bodegroes	Consumer services	Restaurants & bars	Pwllheli	1986	Former Michelin-starred restaurant	P	A
Princes Gate Spring Water	Consumer goods	Soft drinks	Narberth	1991	Water	P	A
Principality Building Society	Financials	Banks	Cardiff	1860	Bank and building society	P	A
Rachel's Organic	Consumer goods	Food products	Aberystwyth	1984	Organic dairy	P	A
Real Crisps	Consumer goods	Food products	Crumlin	1997	Crisp brand, part of Tayto	P	A
Redrow	Consumer goods	Home construction	Ewloe	1974	Homebuilders	P	A
Rockfield Studios	Consumer services	Broadcasting & entertainment	Rockfield	1963	Recording studio	P	A
Rowecord Engineering	Industrials	Heavy construction	Newport	1967	Steel construction	P	A
Royal Mint	Financials	Specialty finance	Llantrisant	886	Coins and currency	S	A
S4C	Consumer services	Broadcasting & entertainment	Cardiff	1982	Television	S	A
Sain	Consumer services	Broadcasting & entertainment	Cardiff	1969	Record label	P	A
Seren Press	Consumer services	Publishing	Bridgend	1981	Publisher	P	A
South West Wales Publications	Consumer services	Broadcasting & entertainment	Swansea	1912	Newspaper publishing	P	A
St David's Hotel	Consumer services	Hotels	Cardiff	2000	Wales' first 5-star hotel	P	A
Stagecoach South Wales	Consumer services	Travel & tourism	Cwmbran	1991	Bus services, part of Stagecoach Group (Scotland)	P	A
SWALEC	Utilities	Conventional electricity	Cardiff	1990	Defunct utility, became subsidiary of Scottish & Southern Energy	P	D
Swansea Building Society	Financials	Banks	Swansea	1923	Bank and building society	P	A
Television Wales and the West	Consumer services	Broadcasting & entertainment	Cardiff	1958	Television, defunct 1968	P	D
Tinopolis	Consumer services	Broadcasting & entertainment	Llanelli	1990	Television	P	A
Trade Centre Wales	Consumer services	Specialty retailers	Neath	2000	Used car retailer	P	A
Transport for Wales Rail	Consumer services	Travel & tourism	Pontypridd	2021	Passenger rail	S	A
Tŷ Nant	Consumer goods	Soft drinks	Aberystwyth	1989	Water	P	A
The Vale Resort	Consumer services	Hotels	Vale of Glamorgan	1994	Resort, part of Leekes	P	A
Veritair	Consumer services	Airlines	Cardiff	1982	Charter helicopters	P	A
Wales & West Utilities	Utilities	Gas distribution	Newport	2005	Gas utility	P	A
Wales West and North Television	Consumer services	Broadcasting & entertainment	Cardiff	1962	Television, defunct 1964	P	D
Williams Medical Supplies	Health care	Medical supplies	Rhymney	1986	Medical supplies	P	A
Woodham Brothers	Industrials	Waste & disposal services	Barry	1892	Scrap metal merchants based at Barry Docks	P	A
Wrexham Lager	Consumer goods	Brewers	Wrexham	1881	Brewery	P	A
Y Lolfa	Consumer services	Publishing	Tal-y-bont	1967	Printing and publishing	P	A

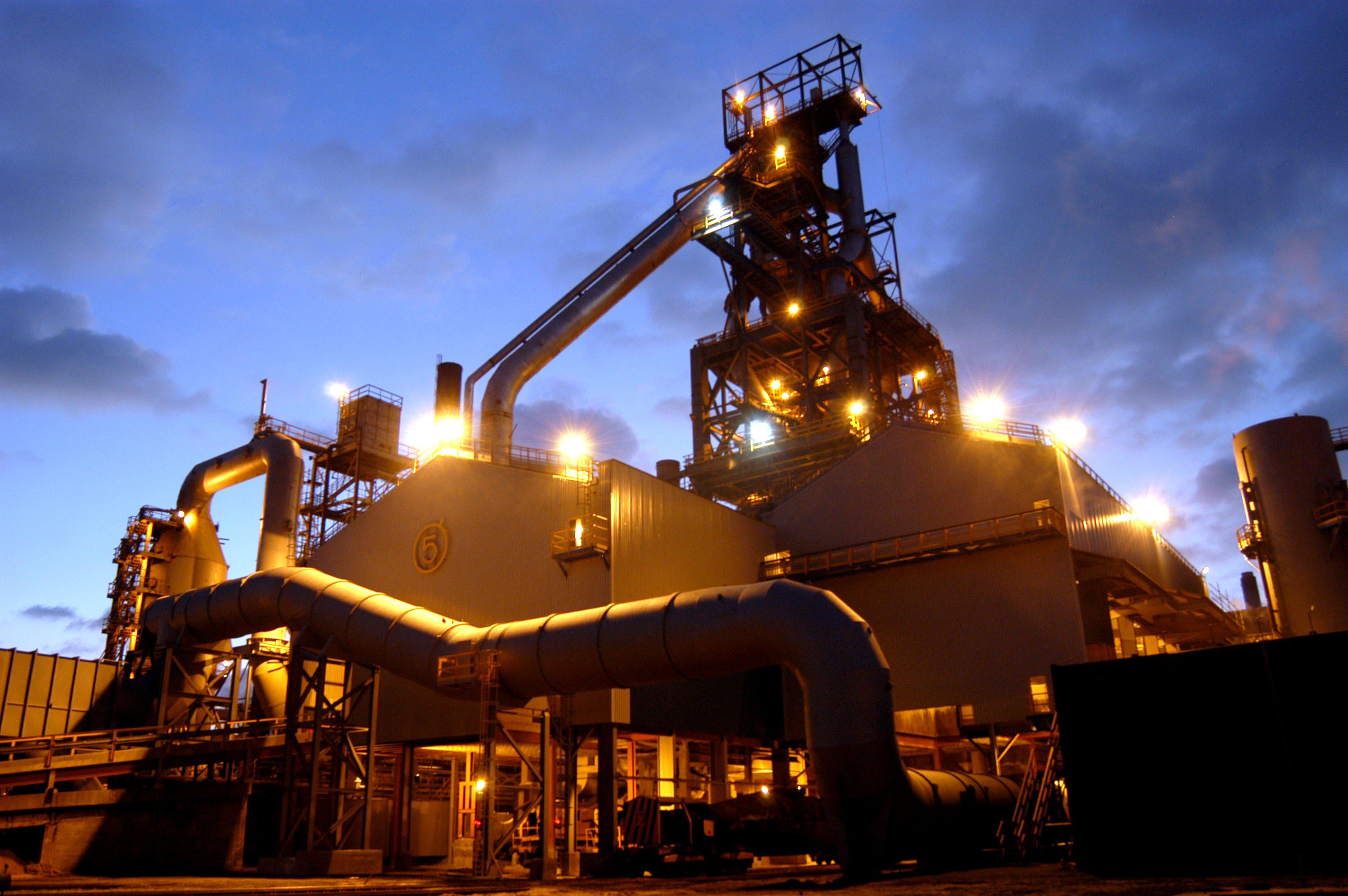
The Port Talbot Steelworks in Port Talbot

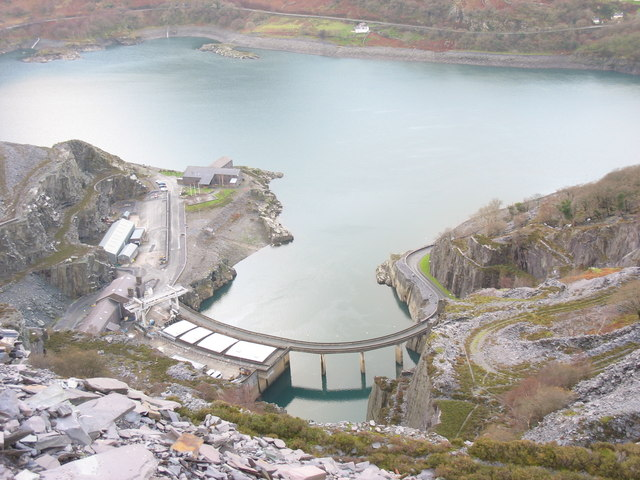
The hydroelectric Dinorwig Power Station

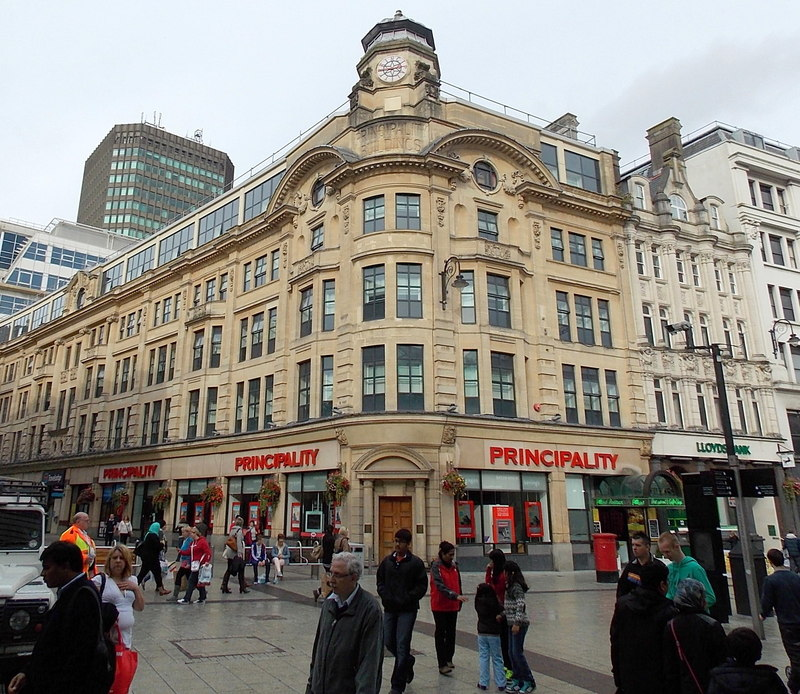
Headquarters for the Principality Building Society in Cardiff

== See also ==
- Economy of Wales
- List of restaurants in Wales
- Media in Wales
- Transport in Wales
