= Otley Brewing Company =

Brewery in Pontypridd, Wales

Otley Brewing Company, Ltd.
- Location: Pontypridd, Wales
- Opened: 2005
- Closed: 2018
- Owned by: Family-owned

Active beers
Name	Type
O1	Golden ale
O8	Barley Wine
CO2	Best bitter
OBB	Best Bitter
OG	Bitter
Dark-O	Mild

Seasonal beers
Name	Type
O-Garden	Wheatbeer
Amarill-O	Golden ale
O-riginal	Bitter
O-lé	Golden ale
O1 dry hopped	Pale ale
O-Ho-Ho	Christmas Ale

The Otley Brewing Company Limited, colloquially Otley Brewery, was a brewery located in Pontypridd, Wales. Established in 2005, it has won several awards, including the Champion Beer of Wales in 2006. The head brewer is Charlie Otley. In October 2016, the brewery was put up for sale by its owners. In February 2018 the brewery ceased trading.

== Background ==
The Otley family owns and operates three pubs in the Pontypridd area; a natural synergy was perceived in establishing a brewing operation. Some trials on the homebrewing scale, when the recipe for O-riginal was developed, led to limited production at Moor Beer Company in Somerset; a full-scale five barrel brewplant was purchased from Moor and production on an industrial estate in Pontypridd began in August 2005.

Beer is currently available in casks regularly at the Otley-owned pubs in Pontypridd and Trefforest and as guest ales in other pubs in the Rhondda valley and Cardiff areas. They also produce bottled versions of Dark O, O1, O2 and O-Garden. 20 litre (36 pints) polypins and 10 litre (18 pints) minipins are also available for most of their beers.

== Beers ==
Otley beers generally have floral/citrus hop flavours, making heavy use of American hop varieties, particularly Amarillo hops; and display a dry finish on drinking. Otley's beers often do not fit closely into the beer style scheme generally applied to British beer.

O1 is the most common beer available, a golden ale at 4.0% ABV. While classed as a pale ale by the brewery, CAMRA's categorization scheme treats it as a golden ale.

By the same token, Otley O8, as of 2006 the current Champion Beer of Wales, is classified as a barleywine under CAMRA beer style definitions, and as such stood unopposed in its category at the Champion Beer of Wales tasting; but the beer is formulated as a strong golden ale.

== Awards ==
Otley Brewing Company has won several awards for its beer since its establishment, and won five medals at CAMRA's Great Welsh Beer and Cider Festival in August 2006, the first year of its eligibility for the awards.

2005

- South Devon CAMRA festival: OG, silver medal in strong ale category

2006

- SIBA West beer competition: Dark-O, bronze medal in stouts and milds

2006-2007

- Great Welsh Beer & Cider Festival:
  - O8: Overall, Champion Beer of Wales 2006-07
  - OG: Third place, Champion Beer of Wales
  - O8: Gold medal, Barleywine category
  - OG: Gold medal, Strong ale category
  - O1: Gold medal, Golden ale category

2007

- Great British Beer Festival: O1, Third place, Champion Golden Ale of Britain

2008

- Great Welsh Beer & Cider Festival:
  - O8: Overall, Champion Beer of Wales 2008-09
  - OG: Runner-up, Strong Bitter category
  - O-Garden: Winner, Specialty Beer category
- Great British Beer Festival:
  - O1, First place, Champion Golden Ale of Britain
  - O-Garden, First Place, Speciality Ale of Britain
