= Poole's Pies =

English food company

- Company type: Private
- Industry: Food Manufacturing
- Founded: 1847
- Founder: Margaret Poole
- Headquarters: Wigan, England
- Area served: Northwest England
- Products: Pies and Puddings
- Number of employees: 50
- Website: poolespies.co.uk

Pooles of Wigan Ltd was a manufacturer of pies and puddings based in Wigan, Greater Manchester, England. Distributed in Northwest England, its 300,000 square feet (28,000 m^{2}) plant that could make up to 100,000 pies and pastries an hour.

== History ==
Founded in Liverpool by Margaret Poole in 1847, it was later bought by Dave Whelan, the owner of JJB Sports and chairman of Wigan Athletic F.C. In March 2012, Whelan sold the company to former Holland's Pies Managing Director, Neil Court-Johnston. who was also a former director of Peter's Food Services in South Wales. Poole's Pies became part of Country Style Foods in 2013. In 2015, The Denby Dale Pie Company joined them.

== Closure ==
Pooles bakery ceased trading in November 2018 with the loss of 50 jobs.

== Sale at football grounds ==
Poole's supplied their pies to Wigan Athletic. As of August 2012, they also sold pies at Keepmoat Stadium, home ground of Doncaster Rovers F.C.
