= Breconshire (disambiguation) =

Breconshire is an alternative name for the Welsh county of Brecknockshire

It may also refer to:

- Breconshire (UK Parliament constituency)

== Ships ==
- Breconshire (1939), a fast passenger-cargo ship, built in Hong Kong and lost off Malta in 1942
- Breconshire (1942), a fast passenger-cargo ship, completed as escort carrier HMS Activity in 1942 and renamed Breconshire in 1946

== Other uses ==
- Breconshire Brewery, a former brewery in Brecon, Powys
