= Bryncelyn Brewery =

Former brewpub in Ystalyfera, Wales

- Industry: Alcoholic beverage
- Founded: July 1999
- Founder: Will Hopton
- Headquarters: Ystalyfera, Wales
- Area served: Ystalyfera
- Products: Beer
- Production output: Approximately 200 brewer's barrels per year at capacity
- Owner: Will & Sandra Hopton
- Website: www.bryncelynbrewery.org.uk

Bryncelyn Brewery was a brew pub in 'Wern Fawr Inn', a pub located near Ystalyfera, in south Wales. Brewing was begun in July 1999, and the brewers are Will Hopton and Robert Scott.

The brewery produces three-quarters of a UK brewer's barrel of beer at a time. The ales have been consistent and frequent winners of awards at beer festivals since the brewery's inception.

Brewing stopped in 2017.

== Beers ==
Bryncelyn Oh Boy pumpclip

The first beer produced was Buddy's Delight; this was done in nine-gallon (one-firkin) batches. The brewery then expanded to 27-gallon batches and began producing five beer types in 2000; by 2002, this had further expanded to one barrel and as of 2006 twelve recipes are brewed, with brewing taking place up to four times a week.

Bryncelyn's three regular beers are Oh Boy, a bitter; Buddy Marvellous, a strong mild ale; and Holly Hop, a golden ale. A further nine beers are produced on an occasional or seasonal basis. The Good Beer Guide describes Oh Boy as:

An enticing hop and fruit aroma, a golden color and a taste full of hops and fruit. Good bitterness and underlying malt add to the flavor, with a long, hoppily-bitter finish.

Bryncelyn's beers are usually available only at the Wern Fawr Inn, but can be purchased for take-away in polypins and frequently appear at beer festivals in Wales.

=== Buddy Holly ===
The names of Bryncelyn's beers all feature the motif of references to the singer & guitarist Buddy Holly; the name "Bryncelyn" itself means "Holly Hill" in Welsh. Pump clips and associated artwork for the brewery also feature Holly's image or references Holly in some way:

- Oh Boy refers to the song "Oh, Boy!"
- Holly Hop refers to the instrumental of the same name
- Peggy's Brew refers to the song "Peggy Sue"
- CHH are the initials of Charles Hardin Holley, Buddy Holly's birth name
- Rave On! refers to the song of the same name
- Feb 59 refers to Holly's death on 3 February 1959.
- May B Baby refers to the song "Maybe Baby"
- That'll Be The Sleigh refers to the song "That'll Be the Day"

Says brewer and publican Will Hopton about Holly, "He was such a talented fellow and he died at 22. He was such an influence on such a lot of different groups and individuals. Elvis was good performer but Buddy wrote most of his own music." Hopton sees the beer theme as a way of paying tribute to the performer.

== Awards ==
Bryncelyn's beers frequently place highly in blind tastings performed at festivals. Buddy Marvellous was awarded the Champion Beer of Wales title in 2002, and Oh Boy that title in 2003.

1999

- Carmarthen Beer Festival: Buddy's Delight, silver medal
- Cardiff Beer Festival: Buddy Marvellous, silver medal

2001

- Cardiff Beer Festival: Oh Boy, gold medal

2002

- Carmarthen Beer Festival: Oh Boy, bronze medal
- Great Welsh Beer & Cider Festival: Buddy Marvellous, gold medal

2003

- Great Welsh Beer & Cider Festival: Oh Boy, gold medal; Buddy Marvellous, bronze medal

2004

- Carmarthen Beer Festival: Oh Boy, silver medal
- Great Welsh Beer & Cider Festival: Buddy Marvellous, bronze medal

2005

- Great Welsh Beer & Cider Festival: Oh Boy, bronze medal; Buddy Marvellous, champion mild ale; Oh Boy, champion best bitter

2006

- Mumbles Beer Festival: Oh Boy, gold medal
- Great Welsh Beer & Cider Festival: Holly Hop, champion bitter.

2007

- Great Welsh Beer & Cider Festival: Holly Hop, silver medal; Buddy Marvellous, bronze medal; Oh Boy, champion best bitter; Holly Hop, champion bitter; Buddy Marvellous, champion strong mild/old ale.

2008

- Great Welsh Beer & Cider Festival: Buddy Marvelous, runner-up mild; Holly Hop, runner-up bitter; Oh Boy, runner-up best bitter

The Wern Fawr Inn has itself been awarded the title of "Pub of the Year" in 2005 by the Neath and Port Talbot branch of CAMRA, as well as "Regional Pub of the Year" for South and Mid Wales by a ballot among all branches of CAMRA in the area.
