= Real Ale Brewing Company =

American brewery founded in 1996 in Blanco, Texas

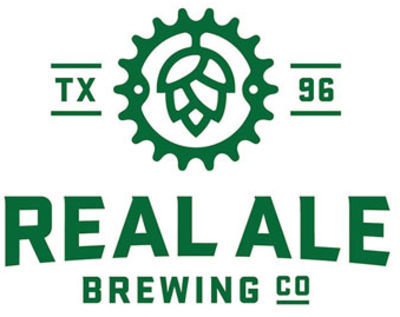

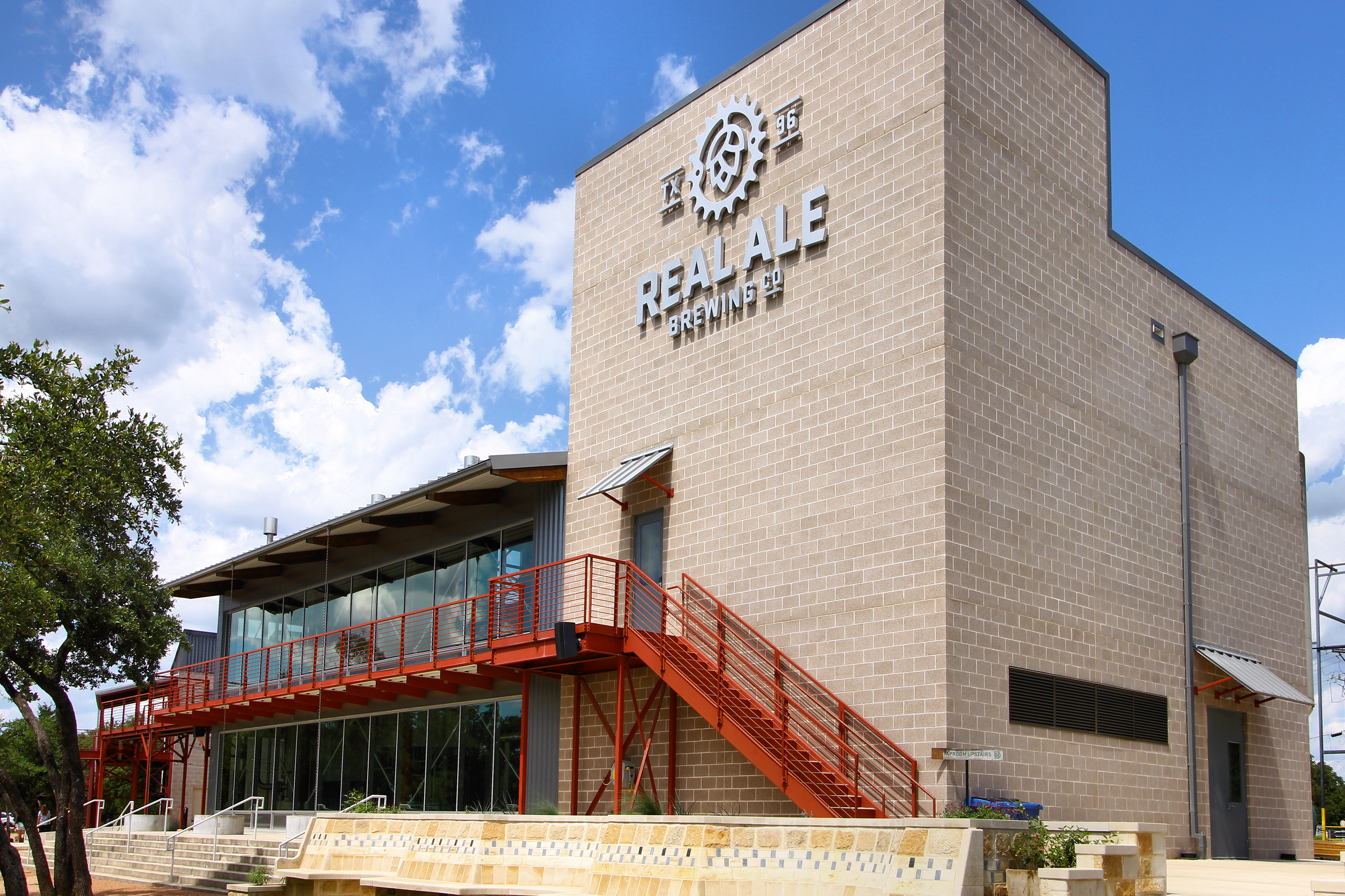
- The brewery in 2023
- Interactive map of Real Ale Brewing Company
- Location: Blanco, Texas
- Coordinates: 30.113255°N 98.41274°W
- Opened: 1996
- Annual production volume: 60,000 US beer barrels (70,000 hL)
- Owned by: Brad Farbstein

Active beers
Name	Type
Rio Blanco Pale Ale	English-style Pale Ale
Full Moon Pale Rye Ale	American Pale Ale
Brewhouse Brown Ale	Brown Ale
Fireman's #4 Blonde Ale	Blonde Ale
Devil's Backbone	Tripel
Lost Gold IPA	American IPA
Hans Pils	German Pilsner
Sisyphus Barleywine Ale	Barley Wine
4-squared	American Blonde

Seasonal beers
Name	Type
Shade Grown Coffee Porter	Porter
Phoenixx Double ESB	Extra Special/Strong Bitter
Real Heavy	Wee Heavy
White	Witbier
Oktoberfest	Oktoberfest/Märzen
Hefeweizen	Hefeweizen

Real Ale Brewing is a regional-sized American brewery founded in 1996 in Blanco, Texas. Their beers can only be found in Texas.

== History ==
The Real Ale Brewing Company was established in 1996 in the basement of an antique store in Blanco, Texas by Philip, Diane and Charles Conner. The Conners sold the brewery to Brad Farbstein in 1998. The brewery relocated in May 2006 to a brand-new facility in Blanco, that allowed increased production from 5,500 barrels a year up to 72,000 barrels a year. The owner credits the local Blanco River as "some of the best brewing water for the styles of beer that we make," making Blanco an ideal location for the brewery.

Local partnerships have included Austin-based Fireman's Texas Cruzer, a BMX cruiser bike manufacturer, for which Fireman's #4 Blonde Ale, perhaps Real Ale's best known beer, is named.

In October 2016 Real Ale Brewing Company announced it was issuing a "precautionary recall" of 11,000 cases due to a potential glass defect.

== Mysterium Verum ==
Mysterium Verum is a line of beers produced by Real Ale Brewing Company in which the beers are aged in barrels. Some of these beers are additionally inoculated with wild yeast and/or bacteria. A list of these beers follows:

Name	Name before aging	Base Style	Wild Beer?
The Highlander	Real Heavy	Scotch Ale	No
Scots Gone Wild	Real Heavy	Scotch Ale	yes
The Devil's Share	The Devil's Backbone	Trippel	no
WT3F!?	The Devil's Backbone	Trippel	yes
The Kraken	Sisyphus	American Barleywine	no
Empire	Lost Gold	American IPA	no
Imperium	Lost Gold	American IPA	yes
Morgul Ale	Porter	Robust Porter	no
Shipwrecked	Real Heavy	Scotch Ale	no
Benedictum	N/A	Flanders Red	yes

== Brewers' Cut ==
In 2012 Real Ale Brewing Company started the Brewers Cut product line. The Brewers' Cut line focuses on developing new recipes to put out to the public, and then relying on customer feedback through social media to determine whether the recipe will be bumped up to a year-round product, a seasonal product, or set with plans to be brewed at a later date again in the Brewers' Cut Series. This is a limited-release product; the releases are as follows:

Release Number	Name	Release Date	Style	Packaging size	ABV
01	Signature Hop Pale Ale	2012	Herkeles American Pale Ale	6-Pack	5.5%
02	Black Quad	2012	Black Quadrupel	4-pack	9.6%
03	Dry Hopped Porter	2013	Porter	6-pack	6.4%
04	Imperial Red Ale	2013	American Double / Imperial IPA	4-pack	8.8%
05	Altbier	2013	Altbier	6-pack	6.6%
06	Blonde Barleywine Ale	2013	American Barleywine	4-pack	9.3%
07	Kölsch	2013	Kölsch	6-pack	5.2%
08	Maibock	2013	Maibock	4-pack	7.6%
09	Witbier	2013	Witbier	6-pack	4.6%
10	Double IPA	2014	American Double / Imperial IPA	4-pack	7.5%
11	California Common	2014	California Common / Steam Beer	6-pack	5.9%
12	Grand Cru	2014	Grand Cru	4-pack	8.5%
15	Signature Hop Pale Ale	2014	Ultra American Pale Ale	6-pack	5.9%
13	Oyster Stout	2014	Oyster Stout	6-pack	6.8%
14	Kriek	2015	Kriek	4-pack	7.5%
17	Helles	2015	Helles	6-pack	4.5%

== Awards and recognition ==
Real Ale Brewing Company was awarded their first Great American Beer Festival Medal in 2010. They received a gold for the Rio Blanco Pale Ale in the English Bitter category. Real Ale Brewing Company was awarded two silver Medals at the 2012 Great American Beer Festival; one for the Fireman's #4 in the Golden/Blond Ale category, and the other for the Hans Pils in the German Pilsner category. In 2011 Real Ale Brewing Company ranked #49 in the Brewer's Association annual list of the top 50 Craft Breweries by sales in volume for the year of 2010. In 2012 Real Ale Brewing Company ranked #45 in the same list for the year of 2011. In 2013, the brewery won silver at the Great American Beer Festival for their Brewers Cut Altbier in the German-Style Altbier category. In 2014, Real Ale won a gold medial at the Great American Beer Festival for Benedictum from their Mysterium Verum series in the Belgian-Style Lambic or Sour Ale category. In 2019 Real Ale was named as the number 4 best brewery in Texas in the Texas Craft Beer Report published by the analytics organization Hopalytics.
