= Stanley Thomas =

British businessman and property developer

Sir Gilbert Stanley Thomas OBE is a British businessman and property developer. He founded the catering company Peter's Food Services and also owned a 20% stake in TBI Airports, until it was sold in 2004.

Thomas was knighted in the 2006 birthday honours for "services to Business and to Charity in Wales".

In 2019 the Sunday Times estimated his net worth jointly with his brother Peter Thomas CBE at £228 million. Peter died in 2023.

He is the Grandfather of Dylan Thomas, who was sentenced to life in prison for the stabbing and murder of William Bush at a house they shared in Llandaff Cardiff in 2023.

== Controversy over land sales ==
In 2015 the Wales Audit Office reported that taxpayers may have lost out on millions of pounds in the sale of government-owned land to companies owned by Thomas, through sales not advertised on the open market.

Andrew RT Davies, leader of the Welsh Conservatives, commented, "It's an absolute disgrace... millions of pounds [have] been lost to the public purse as a result of this land sale." He commented that it may have been the biggest-ever financial loss to the taxpayer in a single transaction.

The Wales Audit Office reported that the government-owned Regeneration Investment Fund for Wales sold 15 pieces of land in 2012 for £21.7 million to South Wales Land Developments (SWLD), a firm financed by a Guernsey-based company owned by Thomas. But the district valuer estimated that the individual pieces of land were in fact together worth £36 million.

In addition, around 120 acres of farmland in Cardiff were sold privately to SWLD for £2 million, while the land's value on the open market should have been around £20 million. Just four months after the sale, Cardiff Council published a planning blueprint that increased the market value of the same land to £120 million - 60 times the original sale price of the land.

The Wales Audit Office report concluded that there were significant flaws throughout the sale process. Thomas refused to be interviewed for the report.
