= Bootlegger (vlogger) =

Welsh Vlogger

Karl Phillips
- Born: Wrexham, UK
- Occupation: video blogger

YouTube information
- Channel: bootlegger1974
- Years active: 2008–present
- Subscribers: 56k
- Views: 2.9 million
- Last updated: May 6, 2025

Karl Phillips, better known by his stage name Bootlegger, is a Welsh vlogger and Internet personality best known for his matchday vlogs on YouTube and his humorous content on social media platforms.

== Career ==
Bootlegger joined YouTube on 17 May 2008. He is known for his matchday vlogs attending Wrexham football games and his drinking exploits.

In 2020, he launched the Bootlegger 1974 Pilsner with brewer Wrexham Lager. However, in 2024 he claimed that the brewer owed him money. Wrexham Lager later issued a statement saying that Bootlegger had been paid up to date before the vlogger's claim to the contrary.

He released his autobiography in 2022, Bootlegger: The Good, The Bad and The Tasty.

== Personal life ==
Bootlegger is married. He has affectionately nicknamed his wife 'The Flamethrower' in several of his online videos.

He works as a roofer.

== Published works ==
- Bootlegger: The Good, The Bad and The Tasty. Y Lolfa. 2022. ISBN 1912631377.
