= Albion Ale House =

Listed pub in Conwy, North Wales

- The pub in 2020

- Location in Conwy County
- Alternative names: The Albion

General information
- Architectural style: Arts and Crafts
- Location: Upper Gate Street; Conwy, Wales
- Coordinates: 53.28°N 3.83°W
- Year built: 1921; 105 years ago
- Renovated: 2012

Design and construction
- Designations

Listed Building – Grade II
- Official name: Albion Ale House
- Designated: 30 December 2005
- Reference no.: 87412

Website
- Official website

The Albion Ale House, commonly known as The Albion, is a Grade II listed pub on Upper Gate Street in Conwy, North Wales. Built in 1921 on the site of an earlier public house, it is recognised by the Campaign for Real Ale (CAMRA) for the outstanding historic interest of its interior. After falling into disrepair in the late 2000s, the building underwent a major renovation and reopened in 2012 under a cooperative arrangement between four North Wales breweries. The restored pub has since received national awards for conservation and heritage.

== History ==
The Albion was built in 1921 on the site of an earlier public house.

On 30 December 2005, the Albion Ale House was designated a Grade II listed building. It is regarded by the Campaign for Real Ale (CAMRA) as having an interior of "outstanding national historic importance" and is rated three stars on its National Inventory of Historic Pub Interiors.

By mid-2010 the ale house was no longer profitable and had fallen into disrepair. It was sold by Punch Taverns to Arthur Ellis, a local businessman. The pub then remained closed for a year while renovation work was carried out at a cost of £100,000. As part of its relaunch, Ellis arranged for four local breweries to work together in running the pub.

The Albion Ale House reopened in February 2012. The renovated building received the English Heritage Conservation Award in the 2014 CAMRA Pub Design Awards.

It was named CAMRA's Wales Pub of the Year in 2013, and later described by The Guardian as one of the world's best bars. Its interior also appears on the cover of CAMRA's Britain's Best Real Heritage Pubs guide.

The pub is jointly operated by four North Wales breweries: Bragdy Nant of Llanrwst; Conwy Brewery of Llysfaen; Great Orme Brewery of Llandudno; and Purple Moose Brewery of Porthmadog, and serves real ales from these and other breweries through eight hand pumps.

Four breweries in North Wales operate the Albion Ale House together

== Architecture ==
=== Exterior ===
The building is a two‑storey public house with a long frontage on Upper Gate Street and a shaped corner facing Bangor Road. The lower floor is finished in brick, while the upper floor is covered in white roughcast above a narrow band of tiles. It has a steep slate roof with simple gable ends and wide eaves. The first‑floor windows have dark‑painted surrounds. At the corner, the upper floor curves outwards above wooden supports, and a tall brick chimney rises through a projecting gabled feature designed to resemble timber framing. A second chimney, treated in the same way, stands to the right of centre on the Upper Gate Street side. There are entrances from both streets.

On the Bangor Road side, the doorway is at the left end. It has a rounded head with a tiled surround and a partly glazed door. Above it is a small multi‑paned window with a circular detail in the centre. To the right is a narrow, vertically shaped window with an iron frame and frosted glass in an Art Nouveau style. The upper floor has a three‑part timber window with small‑paned glazing and a central casement.

On Upper Gate Street, the main entrance is just left of centre. It repeats the rounded doorway and tiled surround seen on Bangor Road, with a similar small window above. It is flanked by brick‑framed windows with shallow arched heads and frosted glass. Another window of the same type is positioned to the right of the chimney. At the far left is a recessed window matching the distinctive vertical window on the Bangor Road front. At the right end are two further doorways: one has a rounded head and is now boarded up; the other has a brick arch, boarded double doors with a small round glazed panel, and decorative hinges. The upper floor contains a mix of two and three‑part timber windows similar to those on the Bangor Road elevation.

=== Interior ===
The Bangor Street entrance leads into a small lobby with decorative tiled walls in an Art Nouveau style and rounded panel doors that include a circular glazed panel. From the Lower Gate Street entrance, a passageway survives with sections of its original tiled wall finish. The lounge to the right keeps its timber wall panelling and exposed ceiling beams. It also retains its original bar, which has a panelled front and shelving behind that includes a round clock made by Parnell & Sons of Birmingham.
