= Peter Thomas (businessman) =

Welsh businessman and philanthropist

Peter Thomas (born 1943 in Edinburgh, died 2023) was a Welsh businessman and philanthropist. He made his first fortune from Peter's Food Services, which he sold with his brother Stanley Thomas in 1988.

== Rugby ==
Thomas played for the Cardiff Rugby club in his early life, and later became the club's chairman and benefactor.

== Honours ==
He was awarded the CBE in the 2012 New Year Honours for "services to Entrepreneurship, Sport and Charity in Wales".

He was awarded an honorary fellowship of the University of South Wales in 2014.
