= Bragdy Nant =

Brewery in North Wales

- Location: Llanrwst, Conwy County, Wales
- Opened: 2007
- Website: https://www.bragdynant.co.uk/

Active beers
Name	Type
Mwnci Nel	Porter
Cwrw Coryn	Bitter
Chwaden Aur	Golden ale
Brenin Bootliquor	Session bitter

Seasonal beers
Name	Type
Trwyn Coch	Warming winter ale
Cwrw Carw	English Pale Ale

Inactive beers
Name	Type
Pen Dafad	Bitter

Bragdy Nant is an ale brewery near the town of Llanrwst, North Wales. The brewery produces cask and bottle-conditioned ales, and is one of four North Wales breweries jointly operating the Albion Ale House in the town of Conwy. The name Bragdy Nant is Welsh for River or Stream Brewery.

Bragdy Nant's dark ale Mwnci Nel was awarded silver in CAMRA's 2010 Champion Beer of Wales competition. The brewery has also produced an ale for the nearby Plas y Brenin mountaineering centre in Capel Curig.
