= Inexus =

UK utility infrastructure service

Inexus is a Cardiff-based provider of utility infrastructure services to mainly new-build construction sites within the United Kingdom. Operating within a series of sub-brands, the company plans and manages the installation of electrical, gas, water and telecommunications supplies, acting as an interface between developers and both the utility service companies and infrastructure providers.

Formerly a subsidiary of French oil group Total S.A., in September 2005 the company was acquired by Australian private equity company, the Challenger Infrastructure Fund (CIF), for an enterprise value of £465m. In 2011, it was listed on the 100 most profitable private equity held companies in the UK, with profits of £43.4m in 2010. On 19 October 2012, Brookfield Infrastructure Partners has agreed to buy Inexus and merge it with GTC Group, with a £900 million refinancing of the new entity.

Inexus Group companies include:

- Connect Utilities Ltd
- Envoy Asset Management Ltd
- Metropolitan Infrastructure Ltd
- Independent Water Networks Ltd
- Independent Fibre Networks Ltd
- Exoteric Holdings Ltd
- Independent Pipelines Ltd
- Independent Power Networks Ltd
- Independent Meters Ltd
- Inexus Services Ltd
