= Champion Beer of Wales =

Annual award presented by CAMRA

The Champion Beer of Wales is a beer award presented annually by the Campaign for Real Ale at the Great Welsh Beer & Cider Festival in Cardiff, Wales.

The award is selected by a multi-tier system. First, individual branches of CAMRA nominate beers that have been in regular, non-seasonal production for at least one year from Welsh breweries in a series of CAMRA-defined categories. The most commonly nominated beers in each category are then presented to tasting panels, with one panel consisting of four to six people tasting each beer in a particular style in a blind tasting. These tasting panels are selected from CAMRA members and other individuals, including members of the brewing industry (although representatives of nominated beers' breweries are excluded). The winners in each of these categories are then presented to a new panel consisting of local celebrities, politicians, and brewers, who, again blind tasting, selects an overall champion, silver medalist, and bronze medalist. Awards are given for the top beer in each category and the three overall top places.

== Winners ==
Current & previous winners are summarized:

Year	Gold	Silver	Bronze
1996	Plassey Brewery Dragon’s Breath	N/A	N/A
1997	Plassey Brewery Dragon’s Breath	Bullmastiff	Tomos Watkin OSB
1998	Flannery’s Oatmeal Stout	N/A	N/A
1999	Bullmastiff Gold	Tomos Watkin Old Style Bitter	Pembroke Brewery Old Nobbie Stout
2000	Bullmastiff Gold	Warcop Pit Prop	Plassey Brewery Dragon’s Breath
2001	Tomos Watkin Merlin's Stout	Brains Dark	Swansea Brewery Original Wood
2002	Bryncelyn Brewery Buddy Marvelous	Bullmastiff Gold	Brains Dark
2003	Bryncelyn Brewery Oh Boy	Tomos Watkin Merlin Stout	Bryncelyn Brewery Buddy Marvelous
2004	Breconshire Brewery Golden Valley	Bullmastiff	Bryncelyn Brewery Buddy Marvelous
2005	Bullmastiff	Tomos Watkin Merlin Stout	Bryncelyn Brewery Oh Boy
2006	Otley O8	Brains Dark	Otley OG
2007	Rhymney Dark	Bryncelyn Brewery Holly Hop	Bryncelyn Brewery Buddy Marvelous
2008	Otley O8	Brains Gold	Brains Dark
2009	Purple Moose Snowdonia Ale	Otley OG Bitter	Otley Porter
2010	Otley, O-Garden	Bragdy'r Nant, Mwnci Nel	Rhymney, Export
2011	Rhymney Dark	Rhymney Export	Otley O8
2012	Heart of Wales, High as a Kite	Heart of Wales, Welsh Black Stout	Rhymney, Hobby Horse
2013	Tiny Rebel, Dirty Stop Out	Tiny Rebel, Fubar	Tiny Rebel, Urban IPA
2014	Tiny Rebel, Fubar	Purple Moose, Dark Side of the Mouse	Great Orme, Welsh Black
2015	VOG Brewery, Dark Matter	Tudor Brewery, Black Mountain Stout	Purple Moose, Dark Side of the Moose
2016	Tudor Brewery, Black Rock	Boss Brewing, Boss Black	Monty's, Old Jailhouse

== See also ==
- Beer in Wales
