= Dyfed Steels =

Llanelli, Wales-based steel company

Wordmark

Dyfed Steels is a steel company based in Llanelli, Carmarthenshire, Wales.

They appeared in the Western Mail list of the top 300 businesses in Wales 2008.

In the year ending 31 January 2011, they recorded profits of £1.5m, having made a loss in the year before that.
