= Boss Brewing =

Welsh brewery

- Founded: 2014
- Headquarters: Swansea, South Wales, United Kingdom

Boss Brewing is a craft brewery in Swansea, South Wales, founded in 2014 by husband and wife Sarah and Roy Allkin. In May 2015 the brewery received a Society of Independent Brewers Gold Award and was awarded CAMRA's Champion Beer of Wales award for its stout in 2019.

In August 2019, after applying to trademark its brand name, the brewery received a cease and desist letter from fashion company Hugo Boss and incurred costs of almost £10,000 defending itself in the legal battle. Boss Brewing had to change the name of two of its beers: Boss Black, a stout, became Boss Brewing Black, and Boss Boss, a double IPA, is now Boss Bossy. The rebranding process cost more than £20,000.

In March 2020 comedian Joe Lycett briefly changed his name by deed poll to Hugo Boss in order to support the Welsh brewery.
