= Shelim Hussain =

British entrepreneur

Shelim Hussain MBE
- Born: 20 February 1973 (age 53); Bangladesh
- Education: Cathays High School; Coleg Glan Hafren
- Occupation: Entrepreneur
- Years active: 1991–present
- Style: Frozen food
- Title: Chairman and Managing Director of Euro Foods (UK)
- Spouse: Bobi Hussain
- Website: eurofoods.co.uk

Shelim Hussain MBE (born 20 February 1973) is a Bangladeshi-born British entrepreneur, and founder of Euro Foods.

== Early life ==
Hussain was born in Bangladesh and was brought to the United Kingdom by his uncle and aunt in 1985. After a year of living in London, his uncle moved to Cardiff in 1986, when he was 11, and he was enrolled at Cathays High School.

== Career ==
At the age of 17, Hussain started working as a waiter at the Indian Ocean restaurant in Gabalfa. Around 1991, at the age of 18, when the local prawn supplier went out of business, having seen a gap in the market, Hussain took £20 worth of fuel and the money to buy six cases of prawns – and sold them on. He saw an opportunity in the market for prawn supply and started off by selling a few boxes of frozen prawns with his friend, delivering them at night while continuing with his education during the day. He started the business with an initial capital of only £20. The annual turnover for his business is around £80 million as of 2010.

=== Euro Foods (UK) ===
In 1993, Hussain formed Euro Foods (UK) and the company has grown rapidly since. He employs over 200 staff and has food processing units in Newport, Barking and Sunderland. Hussain is the chief executive of Newport-based Euro Foods which has an annual turnover of £80m, as well as a £20m subsidiary empire in Asia. He also has a new plant and four factories in Bangladesh, and has started a subsidiary in New York City. He also has invested in property development business in Wales. At present he is founder, chairman and managing director of the following companies: Euro Foods (UK) Ltd, S & B Developments Ltd, SRS Poultry Ltd (commencing late 2003), Eurasia Food Processing (BD) Ltd (Bangladesh), Euro, Linen Service (UK) Ltd, Horizon Seafood Ltd, Saidowla Enterprise, Euro Foods (BD) Ltd & Rosemco foods Ltd (BD). All of factory setup by latest machine and as per HACCP rule.

== Awards and recognition ==
In 2003, Hussain was appointed a Member of the Order of the British Empire (MBE) in the 2003 New Year Honours for his services to business in Wales. In 2003, he won the Eastern Eye Young Achiever Award that was presented by Prince Charles, The Prince of Wales, and he was nominated for Young Achiever at the Asian Jewel Awards. In 2005, he won the AoC Gold Award for Further Education Alumni. In 2011, he was awarded the Personality of the Year at the British Curry Awards, presented on video message by David Cameron.

== See also ==
- British Bangladeshi
- Business of British Bangladeshis
- List of British Bangladeshis
