= Euro Foods (UK) =

UK food distribution company

Euro Foods (UK) Ltd
- Company type: Privately held company
- Industry: Food distribution
- Founded: 1993
- Founder: Shelim Hussain
- Headquarters: Cwmbran, Wales
- Number of locations: 13
- Key people: Shelim Hussain (Chairman and managing director)
- Brands: Crown Farm, Rosemco Zoy, Rohim
- Operating income: ▲£ 80 million
- Owner: Shelim Hussain
- Number of employees: 2,400
- Website: www.eurofoods.co.uk

Euro Foods (UK) Ltd is a UK-based food distribution company, which makes and supplies ethnic food. The company was founded in 1993 by Shelim Hussain, its headquarters is in the town of Cwmbran, South Wales, and has over 2,400 employees.

== History ==
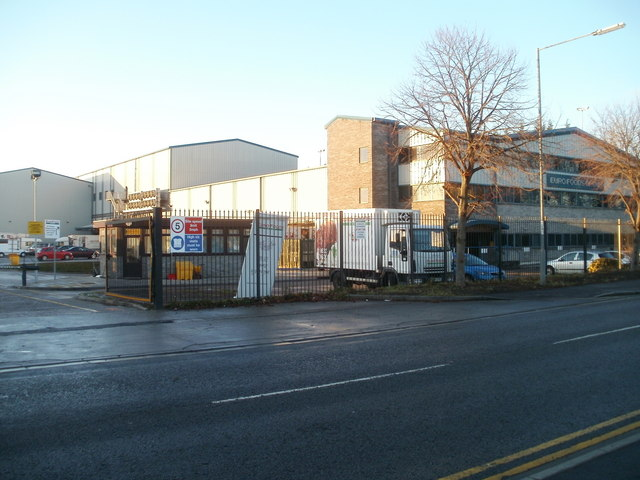
Premises in Newport, Wales

In 1993, Euro Foods (UK) was founded by Shelim Hussain. It has food processing units in Newport, Barking and Sunderland. It has a plant and four factories in Bangladesh, and a subsidiary in New York City. It has three factories abroad and a site in the centre of Birmingham to produce ready meals. In 2009, the company spent £650,000 on a new warehouse. The company has opened five Asian food stores in Wales – called Masala Bazaar.

In 2012, to support the continued growth of the company, it acquired a site in Hayes, west London and a second centre in Wolverhampton after another business went into administration. The pair of sites cost the company a total of just more than £5m. A further depot was also acquired on lease in Wolverhampton to better service the group's customers in the Midlands region. In April 2014, the company bought packaging firm Brown Bear Food.

== Performance ==
Euro Foods made £100m worth of cost savings ahead of the economic downturn during the 2008 recession, during which sales increased. As of 2010, the company has a £80m turnover of ethnic cuisine in the UK as well as a £20m subsidiary empire in Asia. It employs around 200 people in Wales, 280 in England and nearly 2,000 employees across the world. The firm markets predominantly Asian cuisine and in 2010 embarked upon a retail development plan.

In 2012, the company reported turnover of £85.8m in the 2012 financial year compared with £71.9m in the 10 months to 31 December 2011. Almost all of this was generated in the UK. Pre-tax profits also increased to £843,371, up from £657,326.

== Manufacturing and products ==
Euro Foods makes and supplies ethnic food brands including Zoy, Rohim, and Crown Farms to its customers, restaurants, caterers and specialist supermarkets in the UK and Europe.

The company comprises three separate businesses, each operating in the food and drink sector. Caterers Depot supplies to clients in the restaurant trade, EFG Wholesale supplies specialist supermarkets and shops, while Masala Bazaar is a chain of UK retail outlets specialising in Asian cuisine.

== See also ==
- Business of British Bangladeshis

== External life ==
- Official website
- Caterers Depot website
- Masala Bazaar website
