= Brown ale =

Dark amber or brown ale beer style

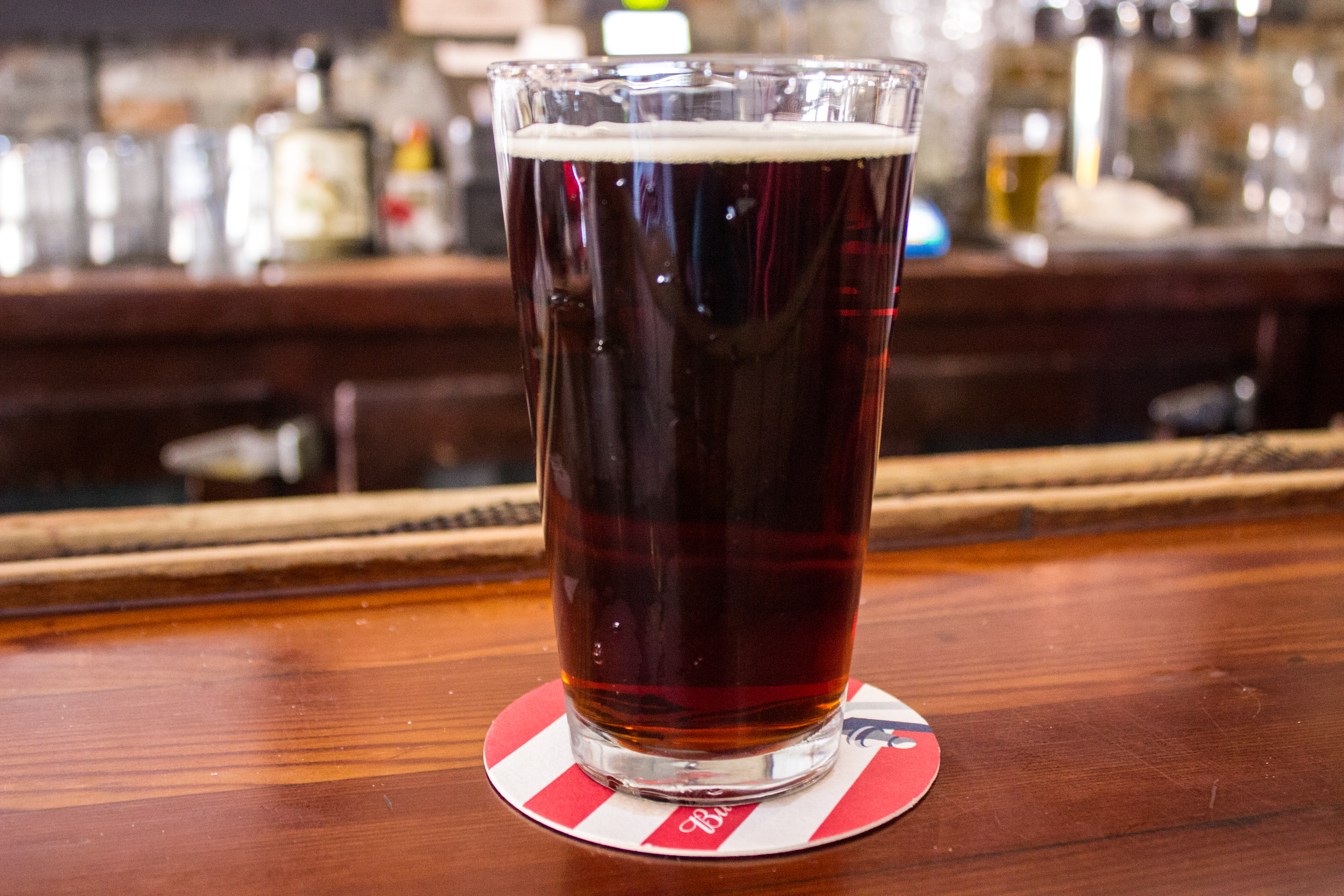
Brown ale in a glass

Brown ale is a style of beer with a dark amber or brown colour. The term was first used by London brewers in the late 17th century to describe a lightly hopped ale brewed from 100% brown malt.

== History ==
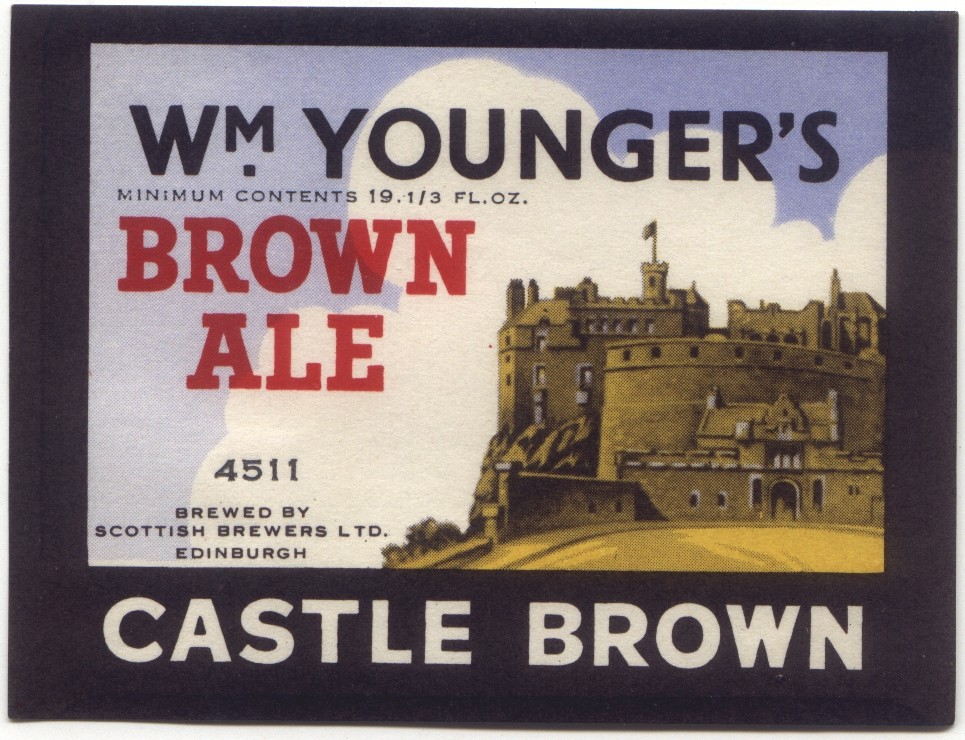
An Edinburgh brewer's brown ale label

In the 18th century, British brown ales were brewed to a variety of strengths, with original gravities (OG) ranging from around 1.060 to 1.090. Around 1800, brewers stopped producing these types of beers as they moved away from using brown malt as a base. Pale malt, being cheaper because of its higher yield, was used as a base for most beers, including porter and stout.

The term "brown ale" was revived at the end of the 19th century when London brewer Mann introduced a beer with that name. However, the style only became widely brewed in the 1920s. The brown ales of this period were considerably stronger than most modern English versions. In 1926, Manns Brown Ale had an original gravity of 1.043 and an ABV of around 4%. Whitbread Double Brown was even stronger, an OG of 1.054 and more than 5% ABV. The introduction of these beers coincided with a big increase in demand for bottled beer in the UK. In the 1930s some breweries, such as Whitbread, introduced a second weaker and cheaper brown ale that was sometimes just a sweetened version of dark Mild. These beers had an original gravity of around 1.037. After World War II, most breweries stopped producing these stronger brown ales, with the exception of some breweries in the northeast of England. The majority had an OG in the range 1.030–1.035, or around 3% ABV, much like Manns Brown Ale today.

North American brown ales trace their heritage to American home brewing adaptations of certain northern English beers, and the English influence on American Colonial Ales.

== Description ==
English brown ales range from beers such as Manns Original Brown Ale, which is quite sweet and low in alcohol, to northeastern brown ales such as Newcastle Brown Ale, Double Maxim and Samuel Smith's Nut Brown Ale. North American examples include Sam Adams Brown Ale and Brooklyn Brown Ale.

They range from deep amber to brown in colour. Caramel and chocolate flavours are evident. Brown ales from northeastern England tend to be strong and malty, often nutty, while those from southern England are usually darker, sweeter and lower in alcohol. North American brown ales are usually drier than their English counterparts, with a slight citrus accent and an aroma, bitterness, and medium body due to American hop varieties. Fruitiness from esters are subdued. When chilled to cold temperatures, some haziness may be noticed.

== See also ==
- Amber ale
- Mild ale
- Irish red ale
- Flanders red ale
