= Tudor Brewery =

Brewery in Llanhilleth, Blaenau Gwent, Wales

Tudor Brewery is a microbrewery in Llanhilleth, Blaenau Gwent, Wales. In 2016, the company's Black Rock Ale won the CAMRA award for Champion Beer of Wales.
