= Tiny Rebel =

Brewery based in Rogerstone, Newport, Wales

Coordinates: 51.590°N 3.054°W

Tiny Rebel Limited

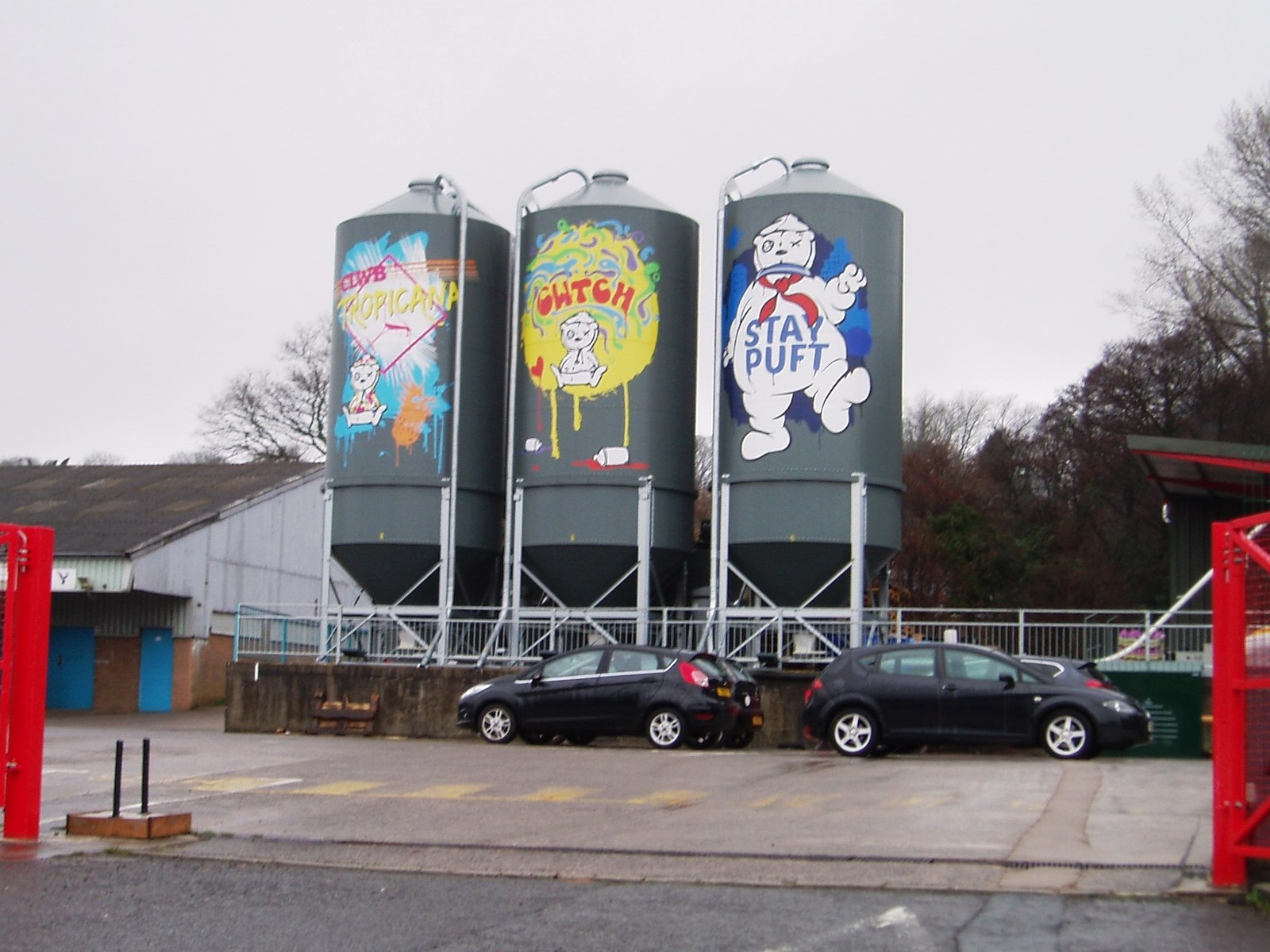
- Brewery, Rogerstone
- Company type: Limited Company
- Industry: Brewing
- Founded: Brad Cummings & Gazz Williams
- Headquarters: Rogerstone, Newport, Wales
- Products: Craft Beer
- Production output: ▲50,000 hectolitres
- Website: www.tinyrebel.co.uk

Tiny Rebel is a craft brewery in Rogerstone, Newport, Wales.

== Products ==
Tiny Rebel beers are available in cask, keg, bottle and can. The company is known for its Cwtch (rhyming with "butch" and meaning "cuddle" in Welsh), having won Supreme Supreme Champion Beer of Britain with it, in its cask ale format, in 2015.

Core ranges of each package are available all year round, with specials and seasonals released intermittently. In 2016, Tiny Rebel released 30 new beers.

The company's beers are sold throughout the UK, with selected products available in Welsh branches of supermarkets Co-op and Marks & Spencer. Around 15% of the company's beer is exported, with Australia, Japan, Norway and Sweden being the largest overseas markets.

== History ==
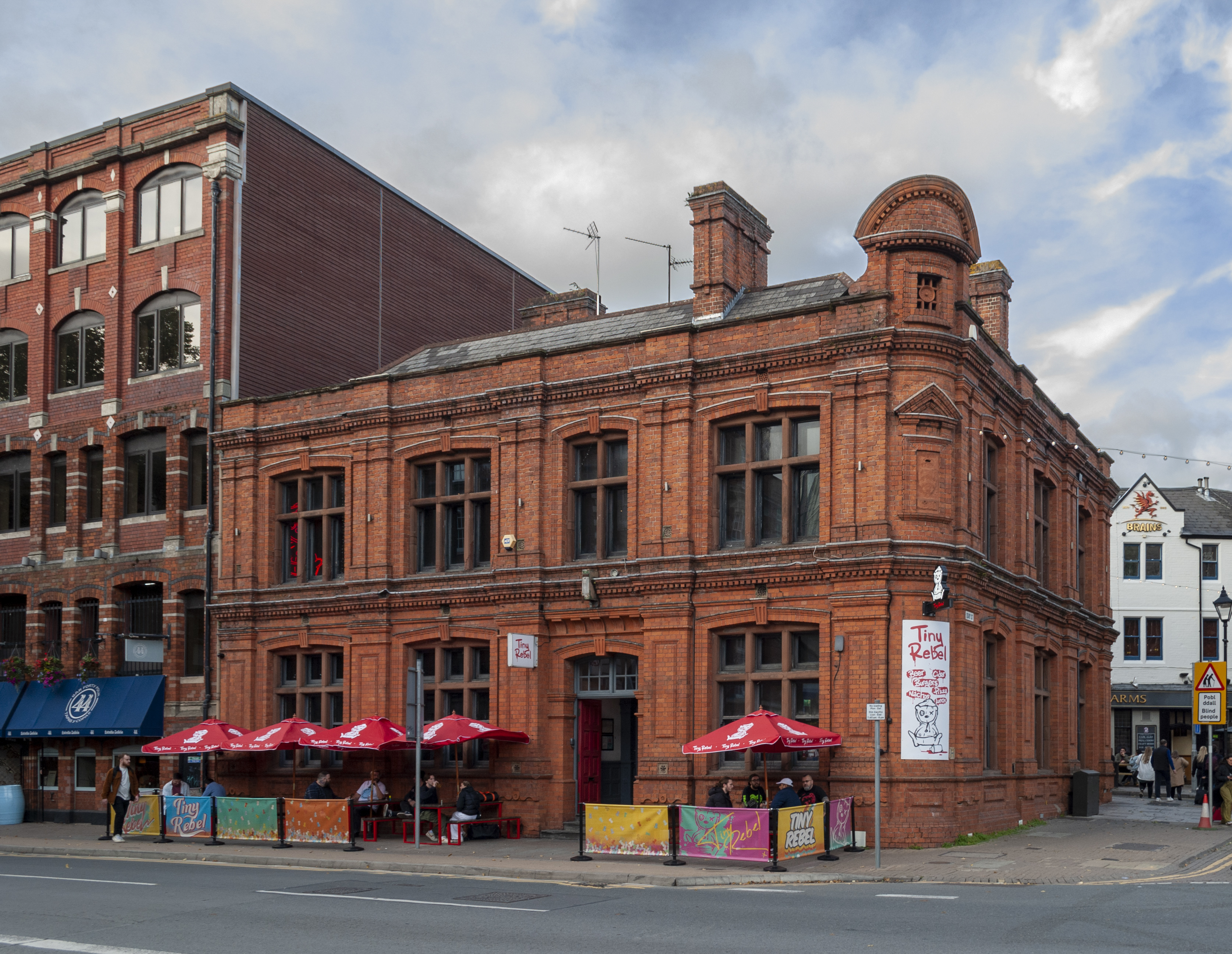
Tiny Rebel pub in Cardiff

Tiny Rebel was founded in Newport in 2012 by brothers-in-law Bradley Cummings and Gareth Williams. Williams had learned to homebrew with his grandfather, and introduced his brother-in-law to the hobby. After brewing in Cumming's father's garage for a number of years, the pair decided to make their hobby their profession. They rented an industrial unit in the Maesglas area of the city. The neighbouring unit was quickly needed, and the brewery expanded into it a year after opening.

In 2013 exports to Sweden of the company's pale ale FUBAR were blocked by the Swedish government on the grounds that the beer's label was contrary to Swedish government guidelines on war imagery.

The company opened their first bar in Cardiff in late 2013, after winning the top three places at the Champion Beer of Wales competition. Urban Tap House was the first dedicated craft beer bar in the city, and a branch opened in the company's hometown of Newport in 2015. The Urban Tap House brand was retired in 2016, with the bars being renamed Tiny Rebel.

In mid-2016, the company announced significant expansion, unveiling plans for a bespoke 36,000 square feet (3,300 m^{2}) brewing facility in the Rogerstone area of Newport. Brewing moved to the new site in January 2017, increasing total capacity five-fold.

The company opened their £2.6million brewery and bar in Rogerstone on 1 July 2017. Prior to the opening, Tiny Rebel ran a competition to find their "Biggest Fan" who would win the chance to cut the ribbon at the opening on the company's behalf. The competition winner was later offered a job in the business.

In 2019 planning permission was given for the addition of a new 30,000 ft^{2} (2,800 m^{2}) distribution centre at the same site. They also changed the name of one of their best-selling beers, Clwb Tropicana, to Clwb Tropica in response to a threat of legal action from PepsiCo, owners of Tropicana Products.

Cummings spoke out at his frustration at the lack of expansion of the M4 motorway which he saw as would benefit the delivery of stock.

Charity activities support St David's Hospice, with sponsorship for local football and roller derby teams, as well as partnerships with BAFTA Cymru and Newport Food Festival.

== Awards ==
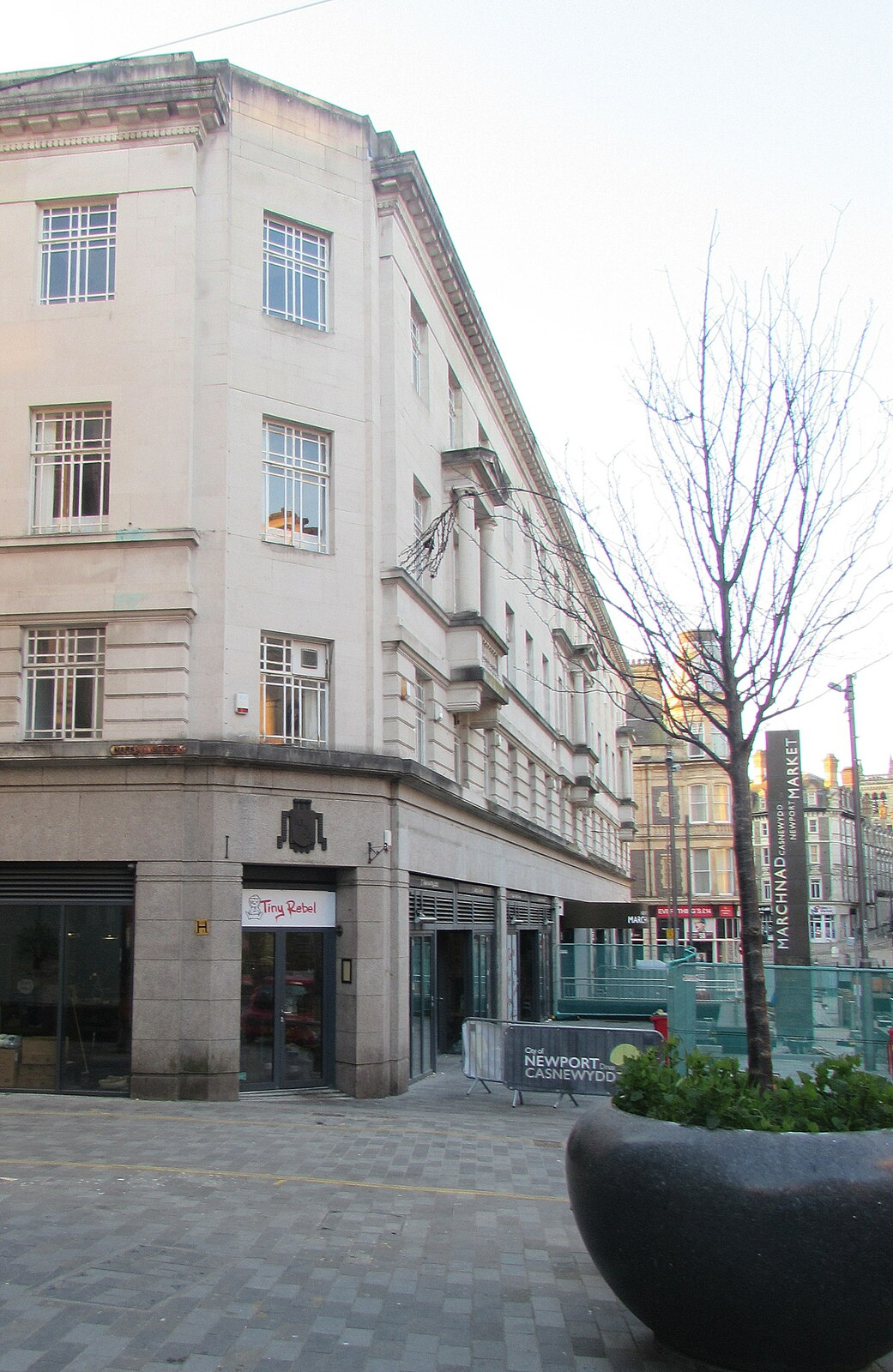
Bar in Newport

In the first year in which they were eligible, 2013, Tiny Rebel took home a clean sweep of Gold, Silver and Bronze at the Great Welsh Beer and Cider Festival at Motorpoint Arena, Cardiff. The following year they also became the first brewery to defend their Champion Beer of Wales title with a different brew at the same festival.

2015 saw a national award, with the company's Red Ale, Cwtch, being crowned Supreme Champion Beer of Britain 2015. The brewery was the youngest ever to win the award as well as the first from Wales.

As well as awards for their beers, Tiny Rebel have been the recipients of a number of business awards, including the SIBA Brewery Business of the Year 2016 and UK Brewer of the Year at the International Beer Challenge 2016.
