= Michton =

Chocolate Factory in Wales, United Kingdom

Michton Chocolate Factory logo

Michton is the largest chocolate factory in Wales.

Created in 1991 by Michelle and Tony Wadley in Enfield, Middlesex, in 1998 the company relocated to Swansea, South Wales. In 2003, Michton opened to the public. In 2008, it was announced that they had been chosen to supply the Rugby Football Union with a range of official chocolate.
