= Mild ale =

Type of ale with a predominantly malty palate

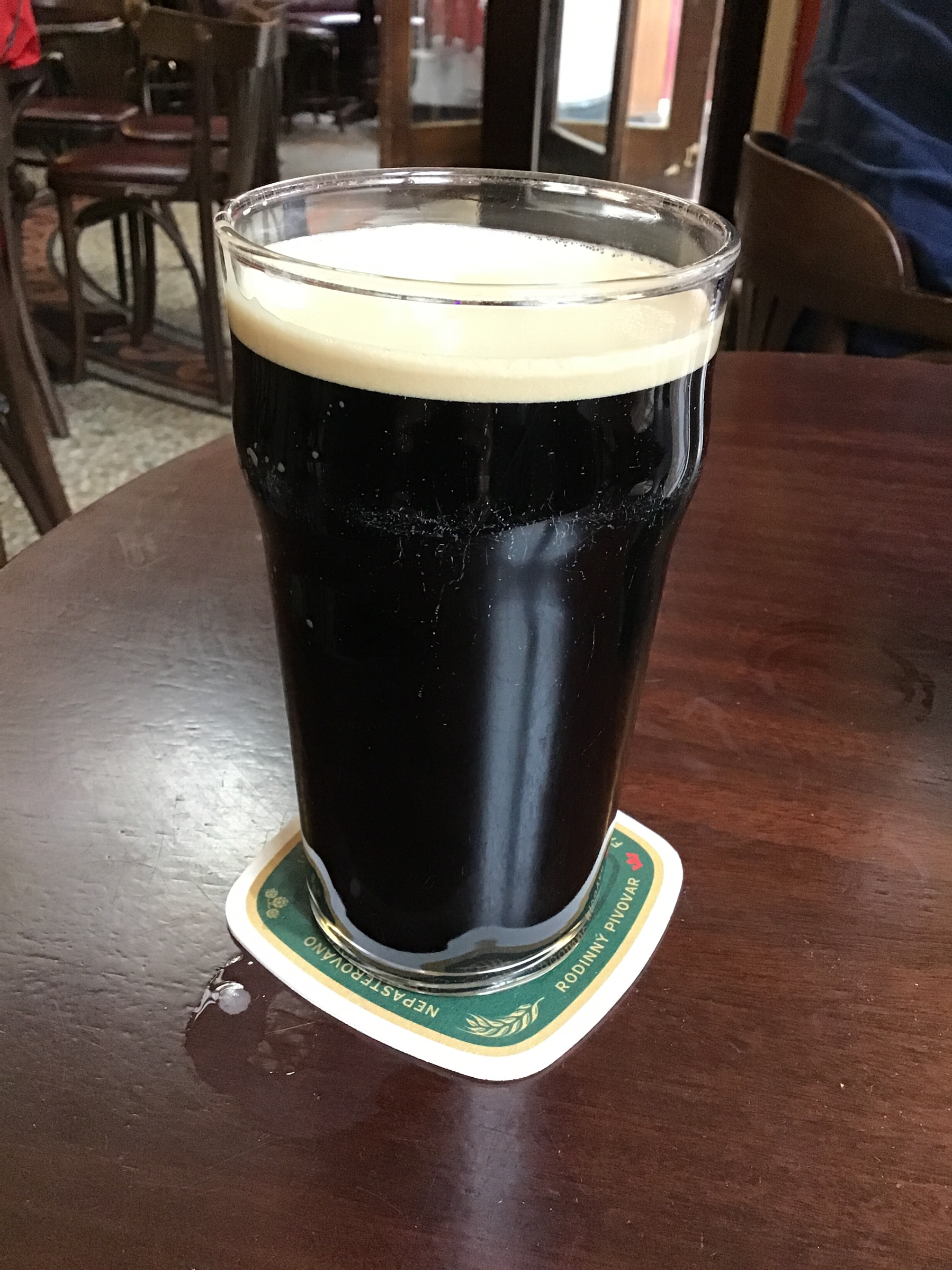
A pint of mild

Mild ale is a type of ale. Modern milds are mostly dark-coloured, with an alcohol by volume (ABV) of 3% to 3.6%, although there are lighter-hued as well as stronger milds, reaching 6% ABV and higher. Mild originated in Britain in the 17th century or earlier, and originally meant a young ale, as opposed to a "stale" aged or old ale.

Mild experienced a sharp decline in popularity in the 1960s, and was in danger of completely disappearing, but the increase of microbreweries has led to a modest renaissance and an increasing number of milds (sometimes labelled "dark") being brewed.

In 2016, the Campaign for Real Ale designated May as Mild Month. In the United States, a group of beer bloggers organised the first American Mild Month for May 2015, with forty-five participating breweries across the country.

== History ==
"Mild" was originally used to designate any beer which was young, fresh or unaged and did not refer to a specific style of beer. Thus there was mild ale but also mild porter and even mild bitter beer. These young beers were often blended with aged "stale" beer to improve their flavour. As the 19th century progressed public taste moved away from the aged taste; unblended young beer, mostly in the form of mild ale or light bitter beer, began to dominate the market.

In the 19th century a typical brewery produced three or four mild ales, usually designated by a number of X marks, the weakest being X, the strongest XXXX. They were considerably stronger than the milds of today, with the gravity ranging from around 1.055 to 1.072 (about 5.5% to 7% abv). Gravities dropped throughout the late 19th century and by 1914 the weakest milds were down to about 1.045, still considerably stronger than modern versions.

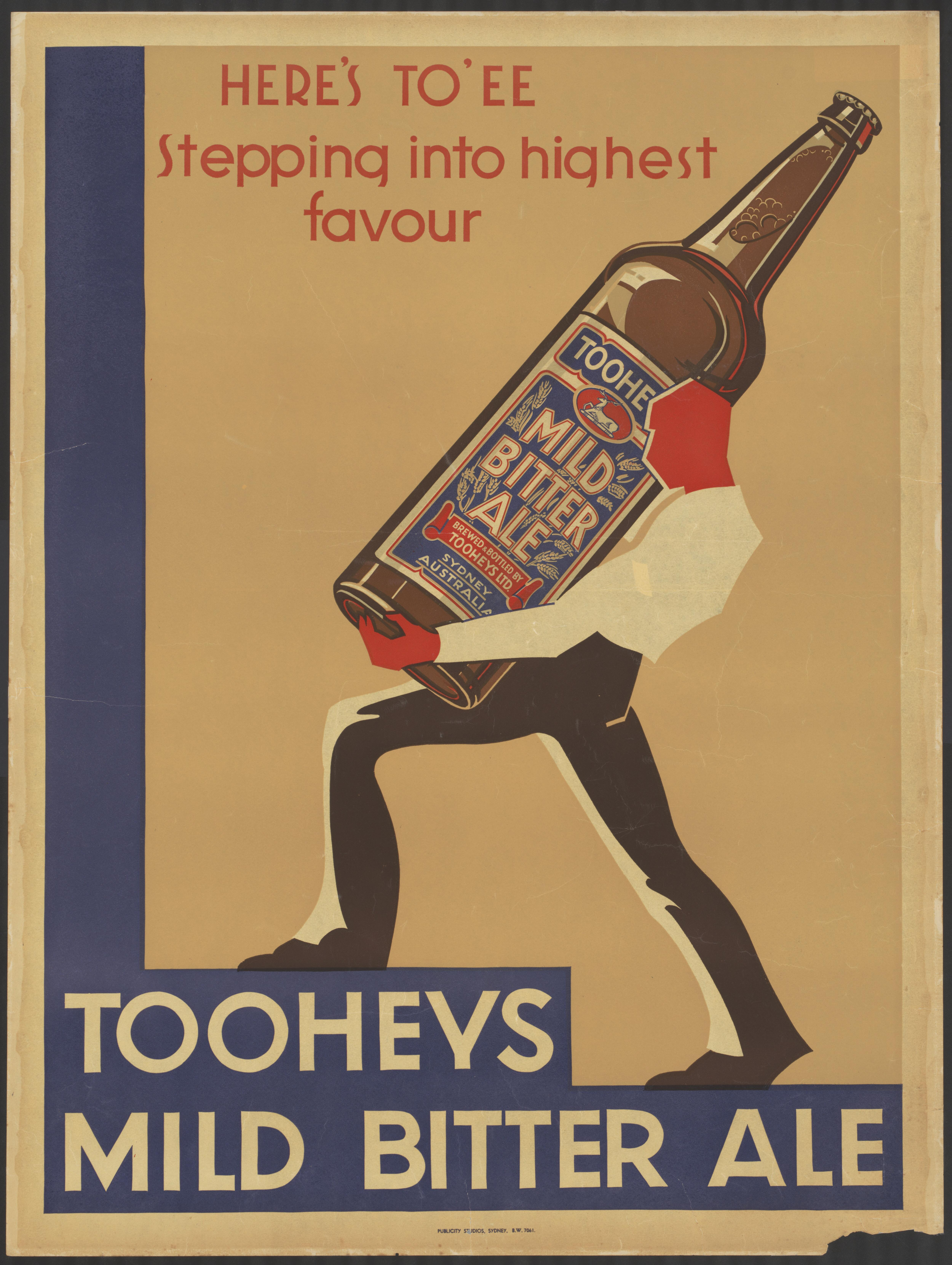
1930s poster for Mild Bitter Ale from Tooheys Brewery, Australia

The draconian measures applied to the brewing industry during the First World War had a particularly dramatic effect upon mild. As the biggest-selling beer, it suffered the largest cut in gravity when breweries had to limit the average OG of their beer to 1.030. In order to be able to produce some stronger beer – which was exempt from price controls and thus more profitable – mild was reduced to 1.025 or lower.

Modern dark mild varies from dark amber to near-black in colour and is very light-bodied. Its flavour is dominated by malt, sometimes with roasty notes derived from the use of black malt, with a subdued hop character, though there are some quite bitter examples. Most are in the range 1.030–1.036 (3–3.6% abv).

Light mild is generally similar, but paler in colour. Some dark milds are created by the addition of caramel to a pale beer.

Until the 1960s mild was the most popular beer style in England. Pockets of demand remain, particularly in the West Midlands and North West England, but it has been largely ousted by bitter and lager elsewhere. In 2002, only 1.3% of beer sold in pubs was mild. Some brewers have found it sells better under a different name. Outside Britain, mild is virtually unknown, with the exception of New South Wales and microbreweries in North America and Scandinavia. Some notable examples are Bank's Mild, Cain's Dark Mild, Highgate Dark Mild, Brain's Dark, Moorhouse's Black Cat, Elgood's Black Dog, and Theakston Traditional Mild.

In 2025, Czech homebrewer and radio journalist Ondřej Soukup collaborated with the Prague-based microbrewery Lajka to recreate a traditional British-style mild ale, named Anthropoid, in honour of the Czechoslovak paratroopers who assassinated Reinhard Heydrich in 1942. According to contemporary reports, Czech soldiers training in Britain during World War II had received similar beer from British suppliers but found it undrinkable compared to Czech lagers, describing it as resembling "goat's urine".

== Brown and mild ==
A popular drink in the West Midlands, "brown and mild" (also known as a "boilermaker") is a half pint of draught mild served mixed with a half pint of bottled brown ale in a pint glass. In North West England, a mixture of half a pint of mild and half a pint of bitter is known as a "mixed". In Norfolk, the same mixture was called a pint of "twos", while the same drink in the West Midlands was called a "Mickey Mouse".

== Brewing ==
Mild ales are generally based on mild malt or pale malt. Most milds contain, in addition, a quantity of crystal malt; dark milds, meanwhile, make use of chocolate malt, black malt or dark brewing sugars. Milds tend to be lightly hopped compared to pale ale and are usually low in alcohol; strong mild ales used to reach six or seven per cent abv, but very few such beers are still brewed. Sarah Hughes Dark Ruby Mild, brewed to a pre-World War I recipe, is a rare example of a strong Mild (6.0% ABV).

As part of the first American Mild Month, the project organizers challenged participating breweries to create a new variation on the mild ale style by brewing with American malts and hops. They defined American Mild as "a restrained, darkish ale, with gentle hopping and a clean finish so that the malt and what hops are present, shine through".

== See also ==
- Beer in England
- Beer in Wales
- Beer styles
- Bock
- Brown ale
- Hvidtøl
- Malt beer
- Old ale
- Seasonal beer
