= Peter's Food Services =

Welsh food company

Peter's Food Service is a Bedwas, Wales based baker and supplier of pies, pasties, slices, sausage rolls and factored products into retail, food service, catering and hospitality outlets across the United Kingdom. Today it is one of the largest employers in Wales, and one of the largest cold meat distributors in the United Kingdom.

== History ==
The company was founded by Thomas Stanley Thomas.

In 1971 his children bought a factory unit on the Pant Glas Industrial Estate Bedwas in Gwent. The children included Stanley Thomas and Peter Thomas A few years later was joined by his brother and sister, selling pies to local fish and chip shops under the name Peter's Savoury Products. In 1976, the business moved to a new factory at Bedwas House Industrial Estate in Caerphilly, to enable distribution down the M4 motorway and eventually into London.

In 1988, the business was sold to Grand Metropolitan for in excess of £95m.

Peter's Savoury Products purchased Harry Thomas & Sons (Newport butchers chain, and factory) in the mid-1980s and Henry Telfers van sales business in August 1989.

After Grand Metropolitan merged with Guinness to form Diageo, the food businesses were demerged. Peter's Food Services became an independent listed company.

However, after acquiring the UK assets of Irish foods producer Glanbia in 2002, by 2004 the company was in severe trouble, and sold its catering business to Brake Brothers.

In 2007, Peter's launched their Seriously Tasty range, and products through brand partnerships with Quorn, Heinz, Sharwoods and Bisto. They also expanded production, securing “own label” contracts with major supermarkets including Sainsbury's, Lidl and Coop.

== Today ==
The company today retains manufacturing assets in Bedwas, its van sales network as well as ten regional depots (located at Bedwas, Swansea, Bristol, Birmingham, Warrington, Durham, Ossett, High Wycombe, Sidcup and Brighton) and employ circa 900 staff.

Peter's Pies celebrated 40 years in business with a special "Cardiff pie", which contained beef cuts, onion and gravy encased in shortcrust pastry.
