= Felinfoel Brewery =

Brewery in Carmarthenshire, Wales

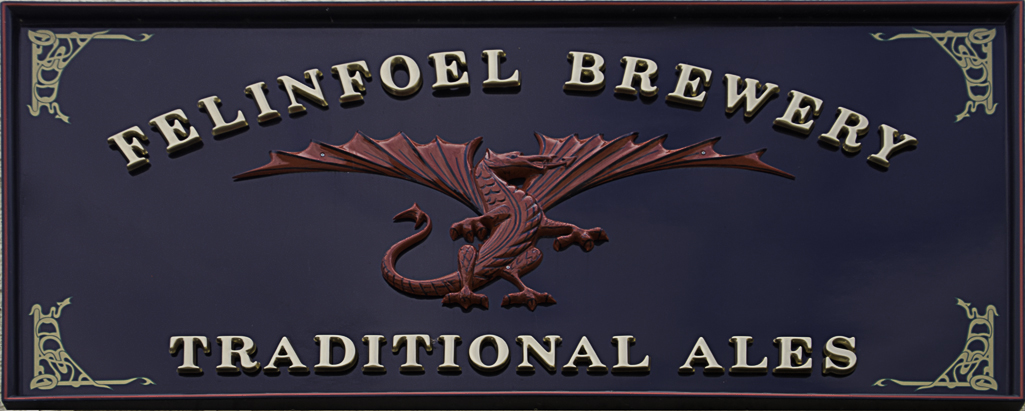
Felinfoel Brewery logo

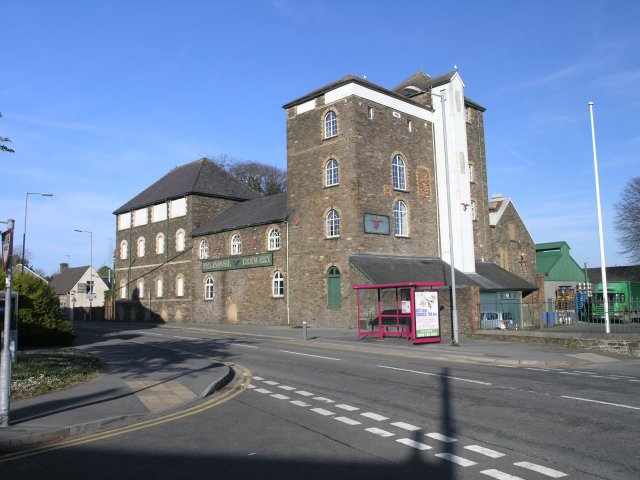
Felinfoel Brewery building

Felinfoel Brewery is a brewery based in the village of Felinfoel near Llanelli, Carmarthenshire, Wales.

The existing brewery building dates from 1878 (according to a date plaque on its south facade), constructed by local innkeeper (and iron and tinplate works owner) David John. The brewery grew to employ fifty people and expanded its market to the surrounding counties. After John's retirement his sons took over the business and, in 1906, it was registered as a limited company. In the 1920s the company was managed by John's daughter, Mary Anne Lewis, a formidable woman who always carried a big stick.

In 1935 Felinfoel became the first brewery in the UK (and one of the first breweries in Europe) to produce beer in cans. It managed to stop the beer reacting with the metal by coating the inside of the cans with wax, unlike the Gottfried Krueger Brewing Company in the US, who had to create a new pasteurised drink to get around the problem when they produced the world's first canned beer earlier the same year. Felinfoel were spurred into action when the Western Mail announced rival brewery Buckley's was investigating canned beer. Felinfoel won the race, producing their first canned beer in December 1935.

Felinfoel had the advantage of owning a tinplate works. In turn, the local tinplate industry benefited from the developments, with Llanelli's Trostre tinplate works going on to produce all of Britain's tinplate for food and drink cans and cookware.

The cans were originally half pint containers, with a crimped metal top. They were packaged in cardboard boxes of twenty four cans. Because of their light weight, relatively to the traditional glass beer bottles, the Felinfoel beer was a popular choice to send to the British soldiers during World War II. However, the wax coating did not work so well in warmer climates, melting and giving the beer an unpleasant taste, possibly leading to Felinfoel's nickname of "Feeling Foul".

The Felinfoel Brewery building has a heritage listing, as a "rare surviving example of a once important industry in Wales". It continues to be run as a brewery by descendants of David John.
