= Breconshire Brewery =

Former brewery in Brecon, Wales

- Industry: Alcoholic beverage
- Founded: 2002
- Founder: C.H. Marlow
- Defunct: 2014
- Headquarters: Brecon, Wales
- Products: Beer
- Owner: C.H. Marlow

Breconshire Brewery was a brewery in Brecon in Powys, Wales. Since its establishment in 2002, the brewery has received numerous awards at Campaign for Real Ale (CAMRA) festivals and others. The brewery owns three pubs in Powys: two in Brecon and one in Llangynidr.

In January 2014, the brewery closed.

== Brewery ==
Breconshire Brewery was established when the beer distribution company C.H. Marlow decided to expand into beer production. Marlow established the brewery in a part of their warehouse in Brecon. The brewery's copper, mash tun, lauter tun and fermenters came thirdhand from Pembrokeshire Brewery.

== Beer ==
Breconshire's beers were made with Optic barley and use varieties of hops from Wales and England. The brewery recommended that, unlike other cask ales, Breconshire beers be tapped and vented at the same time; failure to do so led to incomplete sedimentation.

Ysbryd y Ddraig ("Spirit of the Dragon") began with a standard Breconshire beer as a base, with Golden Valley and Ramblers Ruin known to have been used before; the beer was then aged for several months in whiskey casks. The beer was also sold as a Discworld tie-in beer under the name Bearhugger's Old Restorative.

Fan Dance took its name from the exercise conducted by the British army on Pen y Fan and contained a blend of Progress and "dwarf" hops.

== Awards ==
- Great Welsh Beer & Cider Festival, 2003: Gold medal, Brecon County Ale; silver medal, Golden Valley Ale; silver medal, Ramblers Ruin Ale
- Carmarthen Beer Festival, 2003: Beer of the festival, Golden Valley Ale
- Great Welsh Beer & Cider Festival, 2004: Best bitter, Brecon County Ale; Champion Beer of Wales 2004–2005, Golden Valley Ale
- Narberth Food Festival, 2004: Beer of the Festival, Green Dragon Ale
- Great British Beer Festival, 2005: Finalist, Champion Beer of Britain, Golden Valley Ale
- Great Welsh Beer & Cider Festival, 2005: Gold medal (bitter), Brecon County Ale; joint winner, best bitters, Golden Valley Ale; finalist, Champion Beer of Wales, Ramblers Ruin

== Closure ==
In January 2014, the brewery closed, with the loss of 3 jobs.
