= Wrexham Lager =

Brewery in Wrexham, north-east Wales

Wrexham Lager Brewery Co Ltd
- Logo of the original brand (top) and the current revived brand (bottom)
- Type: Private company limited by shares
- Industry: Alcoholic beverage
- Founded: 15 May 1881; 2011 (revival)
- Founder: Ivan Levinstein, Otto Isler and Robert Graesser
- Headquarters: Wrexham, Wales, United Kingdom
- Area served: Worldwide
- Key people: Mark Roberts, Vaughan Roberts (revival)
- Products: Beer
- Owner: The Roberts family (revival); Red Dragon Ventures (Rob McElhenney, Ryan Reynolds and Allyn family) (majority since 2024)
- Website: www.wrexhamlager.co.uk

Label from an early bottle of Wrexham Lager, demonstrating the Brewery's company logo, the Ace of Clubs.

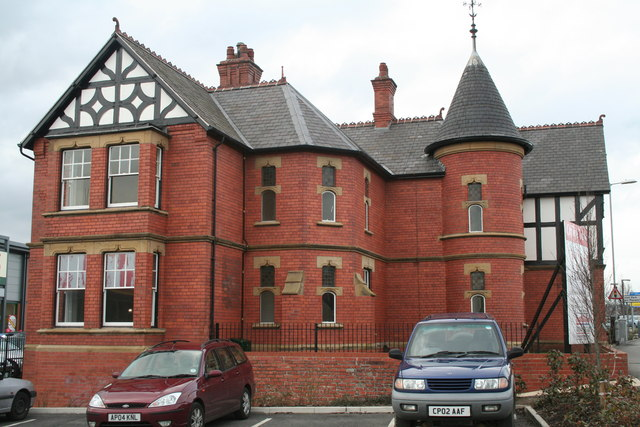
The original brewery building as on the company's final logo is now home to the training provider, ACT

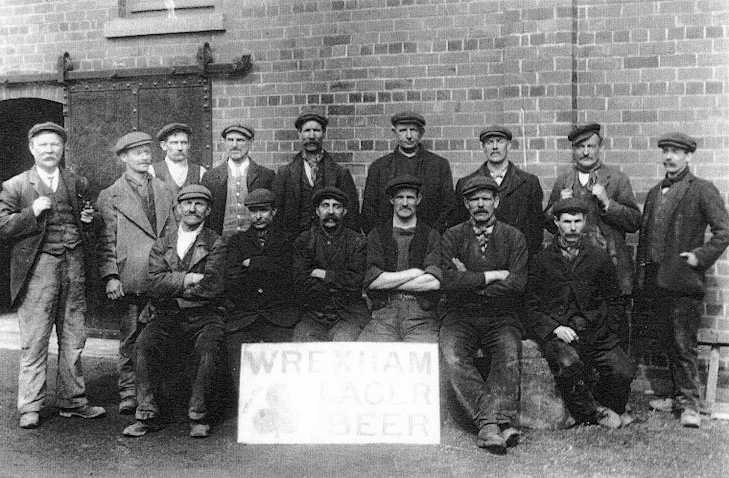
Workers at Wrexham Lager Company, circa 1910.

Wrexham Lager is a lager brewed in Wrexham, north-east Wales, tracing its heritage to 1881. After the original brewery's closure in 2000, the brand was revived by the Roberts family in 2011 using an older recipe.

In 1881, a brewery was set up by German immigrants in the centre of Wrexham. The original beer was exported internationally in the 19th century. The brand's exports decreased during World War II, leading to its purchase by Ind Coope, and later Carlsberg-Tetley. Carlsberg closed the original brewery in the early 2000s, which it later demolished, with only the brewery building remaining.

In 2011, the brand was revived in Bangor-on-Dee, using the same ingredients in an older recipe of the original lager.

In 2020, the brand launched the Bootlegger 1974 Pilsner with vlogger Bootlegger. However, in 2024 he claimed that the brewer owed him money. Wrexham Lager later issued a statement saying that Bootlegger had been paid up to date before the vlogger's claim to the contrary.

In October 2024, Red Dragon Ventures, a joint venture between Wrexham A.F.C. owners Rob McElhenney, Ryan Reynolds and the Allyn family of New York, purchased a majority stake in the brewery.

== History ==
=== Foundation ===
The Wrexham Lager Beer Company Limited was founded in 1881 by German immigrants, Ivan Levinstein (Minshull-street, Manchester, chairman) and Otto Isler (Marsden-street, Manchester), trying to recreate their local lager. Wrexham itself had good water quality, and at one time had as many as nineteen different breweries operating, Wrexham Lager being the first Lager Brewery. The specific site was chosen as it was on a hill and the brewers could dig cellars into it for insulation from external heat, and the nearby River Gwenfro could be tapped for the required water. Brewing of the first lager began in 1882. However, the brewers could not easily keep the temperature down, affecting the quality of the lager and the company resolved as a result of their failure to carry on its business profitably and advantageously to go into voluntary liquidation on 31 July 1886, by which time Otho Horkheimer was chairman and the company offices were Stafford-chambers, 14 Brown-street, Manchester. (The London Gazette, 6 August 1886).

In May 1884 they had announced 'Issue of £25,000 in 2,500 shares of £10 each, bearing interest at the minimum accumulative rate of £6 per cent per annum ... Prospectuses and full particulars can be obtained at the OFFICES, 49, SPRING GARDENS, MANCHESTER. As BREWING and ICE MAKING have been commenced the company are prepared to quote for both Beer and Ice'. In addition to Levinstein (chairman) and Isler the directors in 1884 were Otto Horkeimer, Esq., (Lower Mosley-street, Manchester), Noah Kolp, Esq., (George-street, Manchester), and E. J. Scott (Richmond Terrace, Blackburn). (The Manchester Guardian, 24 May 1884, front page, The Wrexham Advertiser, 16 May 1884, front page).

=== 1888 Description in the brewery ===
"A tour of the building is a very interesting as well as an instructive undertaking. The visitor who is taken to follow the natural course of the grain through its various processes, first visits four large malting rooms, each of which possess a flooring capacity for 600 to 800 measures of grain. The floor is of concrete, and everything necessary to the operation is supplied in what might be almost called lavish abundance. The grain which has been converted into malt is stored in malt silos, huge chambers specially prepared for its reception and where it waits until it is wanted. At proper time the malt is conveyed by mechanical means to the various floors where it is needed, no hand being necessary to touch a grain. After undergoing a number of processes, the brew-house is arrived at, and the mashing of the malt and the boiling of the wort is carried on under the eye of the experienced brewer, or as the Germans call him, the braumeister, Mr Philip Lorentz. During the time of the writer's visit the contents of the mash tun were being drawn off, and after careful examination, and much testing, discharged into the copper, where, by means of dry steam, the necessary heat is obtained for the further processes. The visitor is struck by the scrupulous cleanliness observed, as well as the copper fittings which are all carefully tinned to preserve the liquor from contamination. The writer paid a visit to the cooler, which is of large capacity, and possesses a fan in its centre which is revolved in order to procure a constant current of cold air."

=== Early years ===
In 1886, Robert Graesser, another German immigrant who had established the chemical works at Cefn Mawr bought a majority shareholding in the brewery, introducing mechanical refrigeration demonstrated at his chemical plant to keep the cellars at -1 °C. Local sales did not improve as the people of Wrexham were used to drinking ale as their staple drink; In 1892, the brewery was bankrupt. However Graesser reformed the brewery as, and found a non-local market in export sales, primarily through railways such as the Great Western Railway (who were also the primary method of shipping the beer out of Wrexham), shipping lines such as Cunard, and the British Army; there was documentary evidence of the lager appearing in many places, such as Khartoum as early as 1898.

=== Maturation ===
Although successful abroad, local sales remained low in the local area until the brewery bought the Cross Foxes public house in Abbott Street in Wrexham in 1922. Such tied houses boosted trade for most breweries, but sales expansion relied on local hostelries becoming available for takeover. When a rival local brewery shut down, Wrexham Lager was able to buy the freeholds of their tied houses, expanding to a total of 23 pubs.

=== Mergers and decline ===
During World War II, the export market was lost and was difficult to reclaim after the hostilities ceased. Wrexham Lager's debt increased and the company was bought out by Ind Coope of Burton upon Trent.

Lager grew in popularity after the War and domestic sales began to rise. In the early 1960s, Ind Coope invested £2.5million in a modernisation programme. Wrexham Lager and Ind Coope later joined with Ansells and Tetley Walker to become Allied Breweries, which became the largest brewing group in Britain of the time. Now a popular local drink, the lager and brewery had a cultural impact on the then town, and the brewery once sponsored Wrexham A.F.C. although when they played away from home they usually had the Carlsberg emblem on the shirts as not many people outside of North Wales had actually heard of Wrexham Lager. To this day Wrexham fans still shout a Football chant to the tune of Bread of Heaven, replacing the lyric of "Bread of Heaven", with "Wrexham Lager".

In 1992, Allied merged with the Danish Carlsberg group and the resulting company became Carlsberg-Tetley, who ran the brewery until it closed. In 2000, brewing of Wrexham Lager was moved to Leeds where it was brewed for two years, finally ending in 2002.

Attempts were made during these two years to buy the brewery as a going concern before it was demolished but failed. Brewing equipment was auctioned and the building demolished, the stages being recorded by the BBC. A small retail park, "Central Retail Park", has now been built on the site of the former unlisted building.

== Revival ==
In 2002, Martyn Jones, a Member of Parliament for the nearby Clwyd South constituency who had once been employed by the brewery, bought the original name and building for £1 in 2001. Local activists hope that brewing may continue from this building, at least on a small scale. The building itself is listed.

Emblems of the revived Wrexham Lager, from 2011 to 2021 (left) and from 2021 (right).

In 2010, local businessman Mark Roberts and his brother Vaughan Roberts expressed an interest in reviving the brand, and met with Ian Dale, who was the brewing manager at the former plant upon closure. They negotiated for the brand from Martyn Jones, although certain rights regarding the old logos remain with Carlsberg-Tetley, precluding their usage. After sourcing the original ingredients used in an older version of the lager and obtaining new brewing equipment from German firm Kaspar Schulz, Wrexham Lager was made available on 29 October 2011 at the Buck House Hotel in Bangor-on-Dee. Since that time it has been expanded to a range of pubs throughout the country including several pubs within Wrexham itself.

Within two years of the reintroduction, it was reported the new beer had sold 1.3 million pints in 2012, a level assisted by the anniversary of the sinking of the RMS Titanic, which due to the original firm's contract with the White Star Line, resulted in Wrexham Lager being widely believed to have been sold on the ship. As a result of the demand, within the UK and in worldwide markets, the owners announced an expansion that would increase production tenfold, with the aim of selling 13 million pints within five years. It has also been reported that the firm is in negotiations to have the lager served upon Clive Palmer's replica Titanic II.

In October 2024, Wrexham A.F.C co-owners, Rob McElhenney and Ryan Reynolds, together with the Allyn Family, purchased a majority stake in the brewery. With their purchase, they planned to expand the brewer's distribution, including to the United States and Canada.
