= Hurns Brewing Company =

Welsh drinks and brewery company

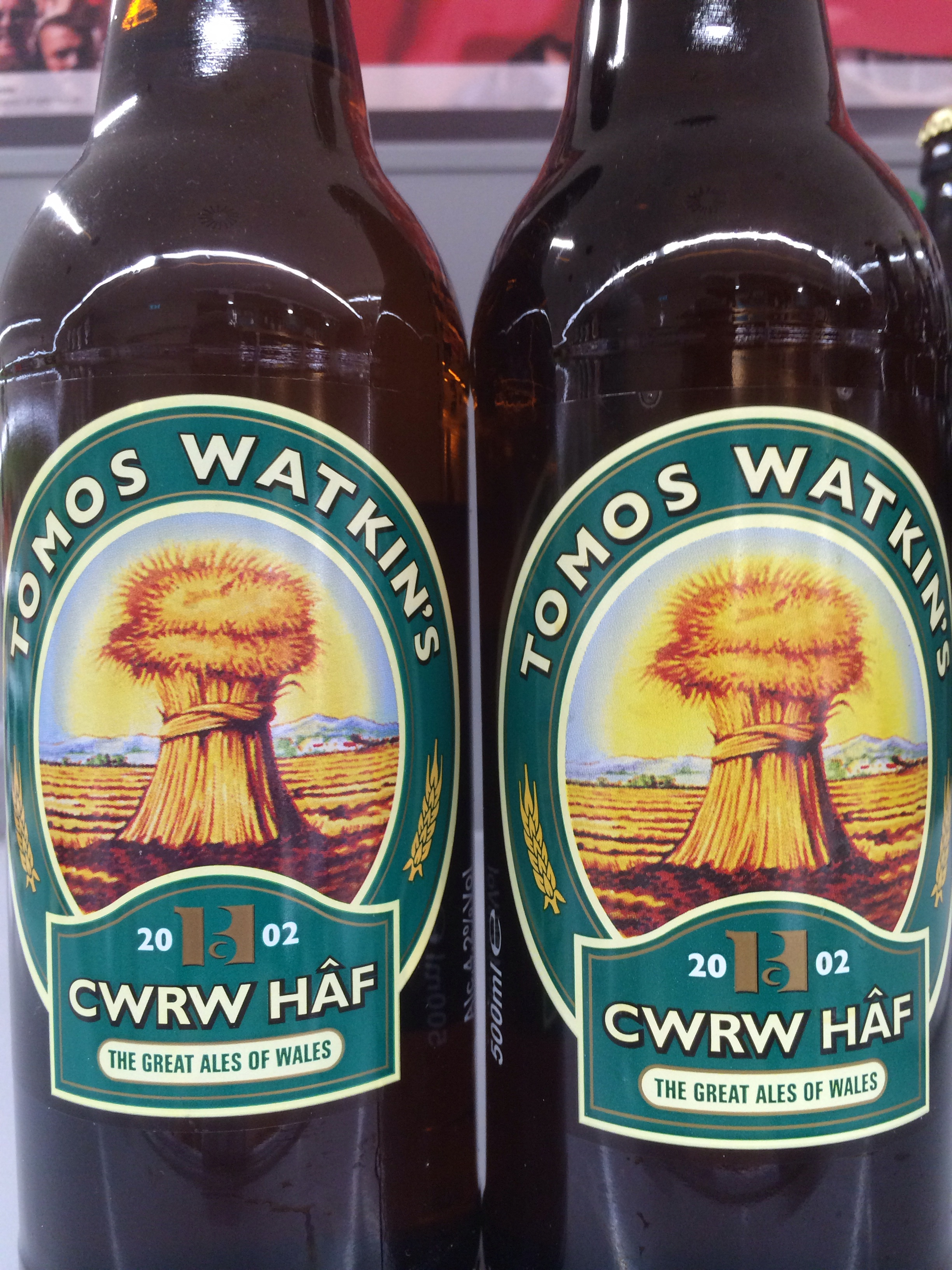
An old iteration of Tomos Watkins' Cwrw Hâf ale when under ownership of Hurns Brewing Company 2002-2023.

The Hurns Brewing Company Limited is a drinks company based in Swansea, Wales, United Kingdom. Hurns own several pubs in Wales. It acquired the Tomos Watkin range of beers in 2002. It sold Tomos Watkin range of beers to new owners in 2023.

== History ==
The Hurns Brewing Company was originally established as the Hurns Mineral Water Company by Arthur A. Hurn, in the late 1800s. Hurns premises were in Northampton Lane in Swansea and they initially produced bottled soda water, ginger beer, lemonade and cordials.

Arthur Hurn's son, Idris, died in 1966 and Idris's son (who had been running the business) unexpectedly died a month later. The company went into decline for the next ten years, until Idris's grand daughter Connie and her brother were old enough to take over in 1976. The company changed direction to concentrate on distribution and wholesale.

In 2010, as CEO of Hurns, Connie Parry was awarded the Welsh business woman of the year award at the Welsh Women Mean Business Awards ceremony.

== Tomos Watkin ==
The Hurns Brewing Company acquired the Tomos Watkin brewery in 2002. The present incarnation of Tomos Watkin was started in 1995 by Simon Buckley. Tomos Watkin first operated from a small brewery in Llandeilo, Carmarthenshire and later opened a larger brewery in Swansea. Tomos Watkin is now owned by Drop Bear Beer Co. and all of its beers are now produced and packaged at the Drop Bear Brewery in Llansamlet, Swansea.
