= Bitter (beer) =

English term for pale ale

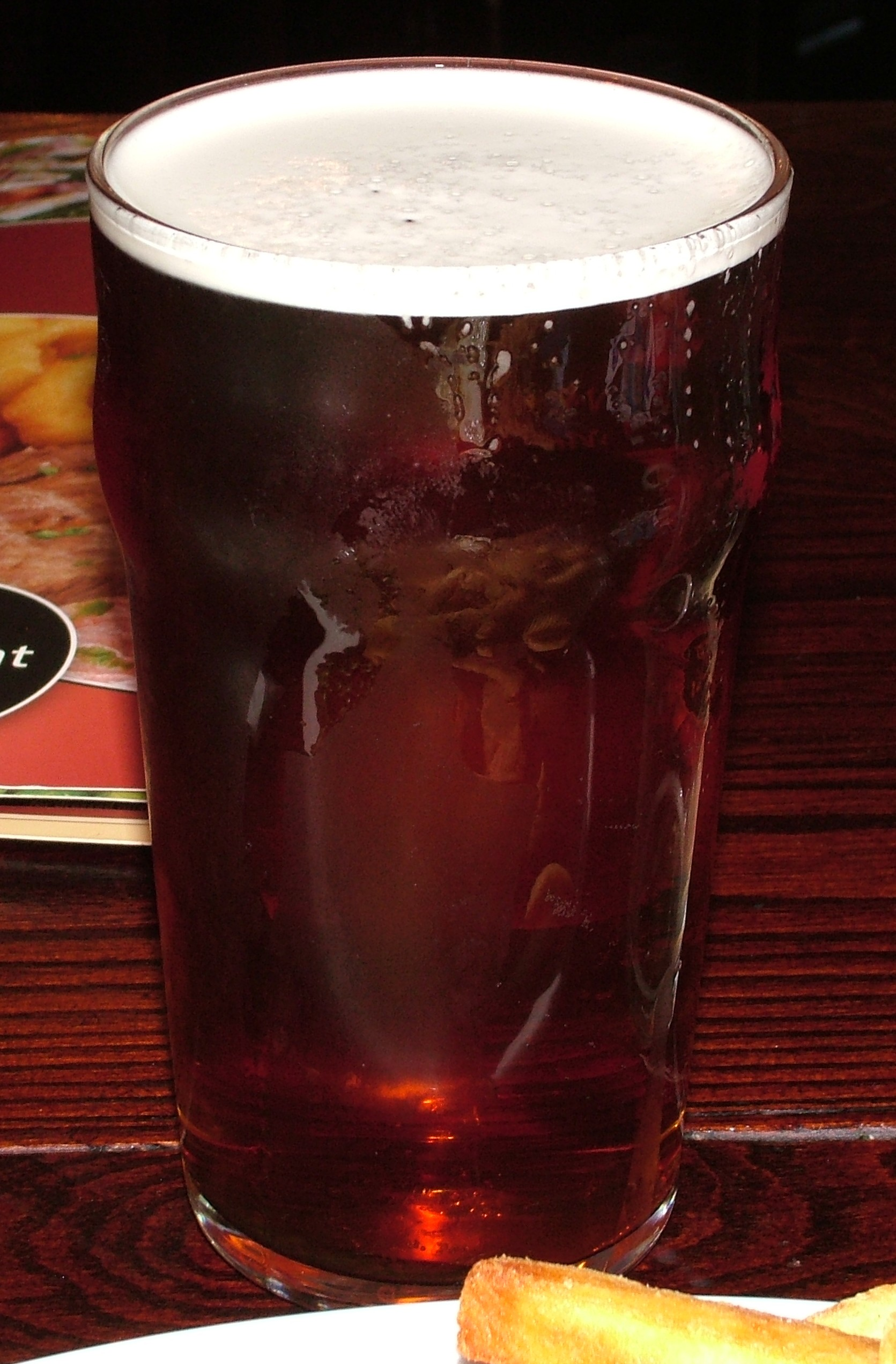
A pint of bitter

Bitter is an English style of pale ale that varies in colour from gold to dark amber, and in strength typically from 3% to 5.5% alcohol by volume.

== History ==
The term "bitter" has been used in England to describe pale ale since the early 19th century. Although brewers used the term "pale ale", before the introduction of pump clips, customers in pubs would ask for "bitter" to differentiate it from mild ale; by the end of the 19th century, brewers had begun to use the term as well.

During the 20th century, bitter became the most popular type of draught beer sold in British pubs and has been described as "the national drink of England". In Scotland, bitter is known as either "light" or "heavy" depending on the strength, colour and body.

Bitter is traditionally cask conditioned and either dispensed by gravity through a tap in the cask or by a beer engine at "cellar temperature" of 11°C-14°C (50°F-55°F). The popularity of craft brewing in North America has led to British-style bitter being brewed there since the 1980s.

== Style ==
Bitter belongs to the pale ale beer style and can have a great variety of strength, flavour and appearance, from dark amber to a golden summer ale. It can be under 3% abv and as high as 7% with premium or strong bitters. The colour may be controlled by the addition of caramel colouring. It is similar to the India pale ale style of beer, though bitters are less hoppy. A survey by SIBA found that in 2020 the average bitter beer strength in the UK was 4.2%.

== Sub-types of bitter ==
Light ale
In England the bottled counterpart of basic bitter; in Scotland, "Light" is the lowest gravity draught beer (normally dark in colour).
Session or ordinary bitter
Strength up to 4.1% abv. This is the most common strength of bitter sold in British pubs. It accounted for 16.9% of pub sales in 2003.
Best or special bitter
Strength between 4.2% and 4.7% abv. In the United Kingdom bitter above 4.2% abv accounted for just 2.9% of pub sales in 2003. The disappearance of weaker bitters from some brewers' rosters means "best" bitter is actually the weakest in the range.
Premium or strong bitter
Strength of 4.8% abv and over.
Golden ale
Golden or summer ale has an appearance and profile similar to that of a pale lager. Golden ale is typically brewed without the use of crystal malts, or at least in far lower quantity to a traditional bitter. In 2020, 83.5% of SIBA member breweries were producing 'pale golden bitter'.

== See also ==
- Beer in England
- Copper ale
- The Campaign for Real Ale
