= Timeline of British breweries =

This article presents a timeline of British breweries, charting the histories and corporate changes of breweries operating in the United Kingdom from the 1880s to the early 2000s. The table traces individual breweries, mergers, acquisitions, and closures across this period, illustrating the consolidation of the British brewing industry over the twentieth century.

Timeline of British Breweries
Brewer	1880	1890	1900	1910	1920	1930	1940	1950		1960		1970		1980		1990		2000			
Adnams, Southwold	Adnams																				
Whitbread, London	Whitbread																	Interbrew			
Flowers, Stratford	Flower & Sons										"							Interbrew			
JW Green, Luton	JW Green (Brewmaster)							"			"							Interbrew			
Cheltenham, Cheltenham		Cheltenham						Cheltenham & Hereford Breweries	WCB		"							Interbrew			
Tredegar, Tredegar	Tredegar		Hereford & Tredegar Brewery/Imperial Brewery					Cheltenham & Hereford Breweries	WCB		"							Interbrew			
Hereford, Hereford	Hereford		Hereford & Tredegar Brewery/Imperial Brewery					Cheltenham & Hereford Breweries	WCB		"							Interbrew			
Stroud, Stroud	Stroud								WCB		"							Interbrew			
Godsell's, Stroud	Godsell's					"			WCB		"							Interbrew			
Lacon's, Great Yarmouth	Lacon's											"						Interbrew			
Fremlins, Maidstone	Fremlins											"						Interbrew			
Threlfalls, Salford	Threlfalls											"						Interbrew			
Chester's, Ardwick	Chester's										"							Interbrew			
Wethered, Marlow	Thomas Wethered & Sons							Strong & Co				"						Interbrew			
Boddington's, Manchester	Boddington's															"		Interbrew			
SA Brain, Cardiff	SA Brain																				
Crown, Pontyclun	Crown Brewery															Crown Buckley	"				
Buckley's, Llanelli	Buckley's															Crown Buckley	"				
Hancock's, Cardiff	Hancock's										Bass							"			
Arkell's, Swindon	Arkell's																				
Carlsberg, Northampton													Carlsberg								
Ind Coope, Burton	Ind Coope						Ind Coope & Allsopp/Ind Coope				Allied Breweries						Carlsberg-Tetley/Carlsberg				
Ind Coope, Romford	Ind Coope						Ind Coope & Allsopp/Ind Coope				Allied Breweries						Carlsberg-Tetley/Carlsberg				
Bindley's, Burton	Bindley & Co				"		Ind Coope & Allsopp/Ind Coope				Allied Breweries						Carlsberg-Tetley/Carlsberg				
Robinson's, Burton	Robinson's Brewery				"		Ind Coope & Allsopp/Ind Coope				Allied Breweries						Carlsberg-Tetley/Carlsberg				
Woolf's, Burton	Woolf's					"	Ind Coope & Allsopp/Ind Coope				Allied Breweries						Carlsberg-Tetley/Carlsberg				
Colchester, Colchester	Colchester Brewery Co					"	Ind Coope & Allsopp/Ind Coope				Allied Breweries						Carlsberg-Tetley/Carlsberg				
Burton, Burton	Burton Brewery Co					"	Ind Coope & Allsopp/Ind Coope				Allied Breweries						Carlsberg-Tetley/Carlsberg				
All Saints	All Saints Brewery					"	Ind Coope & Allsopp/Ind Coope				Allied Breweries						Carlsberg-Tetley/Carlsberg				
Budden & Biggs	Budden & Biggs					"	Ind Coope & Allsopp/Ind Coope				Allied Breweries						Carlsberg-Tetley/Carlsberg				
Leeds City, Leeds	Leeds City Brewery					"	Ind Coope & Allsopp/Ind Coope				Allied Breweries						Carlsberg-Tetley/Carlsberg				
Allsopp's	Samuel Allsopp & Sons						Ind Coope & Allsopp/Ind Coope				Allied Breweries						Carlsberg-Tetley/Carlsberg				
Showell's	Showell's				"		Ind Coope & Allsopp/Ind Coope				Allied Breweries						Carlsberg-Tetley/Carlsberg				
New Victoria Brewery	New Victoria Brewery				"		Ind Coope & Allsopp/Ind Coope				Allied Breweries						Carlsberg-Tetley/Carlsberg				
Hall's	Hall's					"	Ind Coope & Allsopp/Ind Coope				Allied Breweries						Carlsberg-Tetley/Carlsberg				
Stretton's	Stretton's					"	Ind Coope & Allsopp/Ind Coope				Allied Breweries						Carlsberg-Tetley/Carlsberg				
Arrol's, Alloa	Archibald Arrol & Sons					"	Ind Coope & Allsopp/Ind Coope				Allied Breweries						Carlsberg-Tetley/Carlsberg				
Lichfield, Lichfield	Lichfield Brewery					"	Ind Coope & Allsopp/Ind Coope				Allied Breweries						Carlsberg-Tetley/Carlsberg				
Aylesbury, Aylesbury	Aylesbury Brewery							"			Allied Breweries						Carlsberg-Tetley/Carlsberg				
Parker's	Parker's							"			Allied Breweries						Carlsberg-Tetley/Carlsberg				
Wrexham, Wrexham	Wrexham Lager Brewery							"			Allied Breweries						Carlsberg-Tetley/Carlsberg				
Lonsdale & Adshead	Lonsdale & Adshead							"			Allied Breweries						Carlsberg-Tetley/Carlsberg				
Trouncer's	Trouncer & Co							"			Allied Breweries						Carlsberg-Tetley/Carlsberg				
Benskin's, Watford	Benskins Brewery								"		Allied Breweries						Carlsberg-Tetley/Carlsberg				
Weller's, Amersham	W & G Weller					"					Allied Breweries						Carlsberg-Tetley/Carlsberg				
Taylor Walker	Taylor Walker & Co									"	Allied Breweries						Carlsberg-Tetley/Carlsberg				
Black Eagle	Black Eagle									"	Allied Breweries						Carlsberg-Tetley/Carlsberg				
Norris, Brackley	Hopcraft and Norris							C&B	"		Allied Breweries						Carlsberg-Tetley/Carlsberg				
Chesham, Chesham	Chesham Brewery							C&B	"		Allied Breweries						Carlsberg-Tetley/Carlsberg				
Tetley's, Leeds	Tetley's										Allied Breweries						Carlsberg-Tetley/Carlsberg				
Walkers, Warrington	Walker's									"	Allied Breweries						Carlsberg-Tetley/Carlsberg				
Ansells, Aston Cross	Ansell's										Allied Breweries						Carlsberg-Tetley/Carlsberg				
Friary	Friary, Holroyd and Healy's Breweries								Friary Meux		"						Carlsberg-Tetley/Carlsberg				
Meux	Meux's Brewery								Friary Meux		"						Carlsberg-Tetley/Carlsberg				
Thorne Brothers, London	Thorne Brothers					"			Friary Meux		"						Carlsberg-Tetley/Carlsberg				
Thomas Ramsden	Thomas Ramsden										"						Carlsberg-Tetley/Carlsberg				
Blatch's, Theale	Blatch's											"					Carlsberg-Tetley/Carlsberg				
Greenalls, Warrington	Greenall's																				
Shipstone's	Shipstone's													"							
Davenport's			Davenport's												"						
Dare's	Dare's										"										
JW Lees	JW Lees																				
Greenall's (pubs)	Greenall's																	S&N			
Usher's	Ushers of Trowbridge									"			"			Ushers of Trowbridge		Wychwood			
Gibbs Mew, Salisbury	Gibbs Mew																"	Wychwood			
Gibbs Mew (pubs)	Gibbs Mew																Enterprise				
Younger's, Edinburgh	William Younger's					Scottish Brewers				Scottish & Newcastle											Heineken
McEwan's, Edinburgh	McEwan's					Scottish Brewers				Scottish & Newcastle											Heineken
Red Tower, Manchester	Red Tower Lager Brewery								"	Scottish & Newcastle											Heineken
Newcastle, Newcastle	Newcastle Brewery Company									Scottish & Newcastle											Heineken
Federation, Dunston	Federation Brewery																			"	Heineken
Home, Nottingham		Home Brewery														S&N					Heineken
Matthew Brown	Matthew Brown															S&N					Heineken
Theakston's, Masham	Theakston's													"		"				Theakston's	
Lightfoot	Lightfoot				"									"		"				Theakston's	
Carlisle	Carlisle State Brewery												"	"		"				Theakston's	
Caledonian, Edinburgh	Lorimer & Clark				Vaux Brewery											Caledonian				part-Heineken	
S&N (pubs)	S&N																			Spirit	
Watney Mann (pubs)	Watney Mann/Grand Met																"			Spirit	
Courage (pubs)	Courage															Inntrepreneur			Enterprise		
Ballard's																		Ballard's			
Bateman's	Bateman's																				
Banks & Taylor														Banks & Taylor/B&T							
Daniel Batham	Daniel Batham																				
Donnington, Donnington	Donnington Brewery																				
Elgoods	Elgoods																				
Everards	Everards																				
Felinfoel	Felinfoel																				
Frederic Robinson, Stockport	Frederic Robinson																				
Fuller's, London	Fuller, Smith & Turner																				
Gale's	Gale's																			"	
Greene King, Bury St Edmunds	Greene King																			Greene King	
Morland	Morland Brewery|Morland					Morland												"		Greene King	
Saxby's		"				Morland												"		Greene King	
Field's	Field & Sons	"				Morland												"		Greene King	
Wantage, Wantage	Wantage Brewery		"			Morland												"		Greene King	
Dymore-Brown	Dymore-Brown & Sons					Morland												"		Greene King	
Field's	Field & Sons					Morland												"		Greene King	
Hewett & Co	Tower Steam Brewery					Morland												"		Greene King	
Ruddles, Oakham	Langham Brewery				Ruddles										Watneys	Grolsch	"	"		Greene King	
Ridley's	Ridley's																			Greene King	
Cobbold	Cobbold Brewery								Tolly Cobbold										"	Greene King	
Tollemache	Tollemache Brewery								Tolly Cobbold										"	Greene King	
SA Paine's	SA Paine															"			"	Greene King	
Belhaven, Dunbar	Belhaven																		"	Greene King	
Hardy's, Kimberley	William & Thomas Hardy					Hardy & Hanson's														Greene King	
Hanson's, Kimberley	Hanson's					Hardy & Hanson's														Greene King	
Hall & Woodhouse	Hall & Woodhouse																				
King & Barnes	Barnes			King & Barnes														"			
Harveys	Harveys																				
Charles Wells, Bedford	Charles Wells																			Wells and Young's	
Young's, Wandsworth	Young & Co																			Wells and Young's	
Courage, London	John Courage												Imperial		Elders IXL/Fosters	Courage	S&N				"
Courage, Reading													Imperial		Elders IXL/Fosters	Courage	S&N				Heineken
Barclay, Perkins & Co	Barclay, Perkins & Co								"				Imperial		Elders IXL/Fosters	Courage	S&N				Heineken
Georges, Bristol	Georges, Rickettes & Sons	Bristol Brewery Georges & Co									"		Imperial		Elders IXL/Fosters	Courage	S&N				Heineken
Bristol United, Bristol	Bristol United Breweries								"		"		Imperial		Elders IXL/Fosters	Courage	S&N				Heineken
Simonds, Reading	Simonds Brewery									"			Imperial		Elders IXL/Fosters	Courage	S&N				Heineken
Plymouth, Plymouth	Plymouth Breweries											"	Imperial		Elders IXL/Fosters	Courage	S&N				Heineken
John Smith's, Tadcaster	John Smith's											"	Imperial		Elders IXL/Fosters	Courage	S&N				Heineken
Shaw's	William Shaw							"				"	Imperial		Elders IXL/Fosters	Courage	S&N				Heineken
Watneys	James Watney		Watney, Combe & Reid						Watney Mann				Grand Metropolitan			Courage	S&N				Heineken
Combe Delafield	Combe Delafield & Co		Watney, Combe & Reid						Watney Mann				Grand Metropolitan			Courage	S&N				Heineken
Reid's	Reid and Co		Watney, Combe & Reid						Watney Mann				Grand Metropolitan			Courage	S&N				Heineken
Crowley's, Alton	Crowley's							"	Watney Mann				Grand Metropolitan			Courage	S&N				Heineken
Mann's	Mann, Crossman & Paulin								Watney Mann				Grand Metropolitan			Courage	S&N				Heineken
Webster's, Halifax	Samuel Webster												Grand Metropolitan			Courage	S&N				Heineken
Stock's	Joseph Stocks & Co					"							Grand Metropolitan			Courage	S&N				Heineken
Hey's	J Hey & Co											"	Grand Metropolitan			Courage	S&N				Heineken
Phipps, Northampton	Phipps								Phipps NBC	"			Grand Metropolitan			Courage	S&N				Heineken
Ratliffe & Jeffery	Ratliffe & Jeffery		"						Phipps NBC	"			Grand Metropolitan			Courage	S&N				Heineken
Hipwell's, Olney	Hipwell's				"				Phipps NBC	"			Grand Metropolitan			Courage	S&N				Heineken
Castle	T Manning						"		Phipps NBC	"			Grand Metropolitan			Courage	S&N				Heineken
Campbell Praed	Campbell Praed							"	Phipps NBC	"			Grand Metropolitan			Courage	S&N				Heineken
Dulley's, Wellingborough	Dulley's				"				Phipps NBC	"			Grand Metropolitan			Courage	S&N				Heineken
NBC, Northampton	Northampton Brewery Co								Phipps NBC	"			Grand Metropolitan			Courage	S&N				Heineken
Lion	Lion Brewery Co	"							Phipps NBC	"			Grand Metropolitan			Courage	S&N				Heineken
Allen & Burnett	Allen & Burnett	"							Phipps NBC	"			Grand Metropolitan			Courage	S&N				Heineken
Hope	Hope Brewery		"						Phipps NBC	"			Grand Metropolitan			Courage	S&N				Heineken
Chouler & Company	Chouler & Company		"						Phipps NBC	"			Grand Metropolitan			Courage	S&N				Heineken
Eady & Dulley	Eady & Dulley					"			Phipps NBC	"			Grand Metropolitan			Courage	S&N				Heineken
Phillips	Phillips							"	Phipps NBC	"			Grand Metropolitan			Courage	S&N				Heineken
Truman's, London	Truman, Hanbury, Buxton & Co												Grand Metropolitan			Courage	S&N				Heineken
Holdens	Holdens																				
Hook Norton, Hook Norton	Hook Norton Brewery																				
Hydes, Manchester	Hydes																				
Holt's	Joseph Holt																				
Banks', Wolverhampton	Banks & Co	Wolverhampton & Dudley Breweries																			Marston's
Thompson's, Dudley	Dudley & Victoria	Wolverhampton & Dudley Breweries																			Marston's
Smith's, Wolverhampton	Smith's	Wolverhampton & Dudley Breweries																			Marston's
Hanson's, Dudley	Hanson's							"													Marston's
Marston's, Burton	J. Marston		Marston, Thompson & Evershed															"			Marston's
Thompson's, Burton	John Thompson & Son		"															"			Marston's
Evershed's, Burton	Evershed's			"														"			Marston's
Mansfield, Mansfield	Mansfield Brewery																	"			Marston's
Jennings, Cockermouth	Jennings Brewery																			"	Marston's
Wychwood, Witney														Glenny Brewery		Wychwood Brewery			Refresh UK		Marston's
Brakspear, Henley	Brakspear																			"	Marston's
Brakspear's (pubs)	Brakspear's																				Marston's
Burtonwood, Burtonwood	Burtonwood Brewery																Burtonwood Thomas Hardy			Thomas Hardy Ltd	
Morrells, Oxford	Morrell's																Burtonwood Thomas Hardy			Greene King	
Thomas Hardy	Eldridge Pope																Burtonwood Thomas Hardy			Greene King	
Eldridge Pope (pubs)	Eldridge Pope																			Marston's	
Castle Eden Brewery, Castle Eden	Castle Eden										Whitbread						Castle Eden		W&D (Cameron's)		"
Cameron's, Hartlepool	Cameron's												Ellerman	Barclay Brothers		W&D					"
McMullens	McMullens																				
Bass (pubs)	Bass pubs																	Six Continents		Mitchells & Butlers	
Bass, Burton	William Bass/Bass, Ratcliff & Gretton										Bass, Mitchells & Butlers	Bass Charrington						Interbrew	Coors/Molson Coors		
Walker's	Walker's					"					Bass, Mitchells & Butlers	Bass Charrington						Interbrew	Coors/Molson Coors		
Thomas Salt	Thomas Salt					"					Bass, Mitchells & Butlers	Bass Charrington						Interbrew	Coors/Molson Coors		
Worthington, Burton	Worthington					"					Bass, Mitchells & Butlers	Bass Charrington						Interbrew	Coors/Molson Coors		
James Eadie	James Eadie						"				Bass, Mitchells & Butlers	Bass Charrington						Interbrew	Coors/Molson Coors		
Tadcaster Twr, Tadcaster		Tadcaster Tower Brewery						"			Bass, Mitchells & Butlers	Bass Charrington						Interbrew	Coors/Molson Coors		
Mitchell's, Smethwick	Henry Mitchell		Mitchells & Butlers								Bass, Mitchells & Butlers	Bass Charrington						Interbrew	Coors/Molson Coors		
Butler's, Wolverhampton	William Butler		Mitchells & Butlers								Bass, Mitchells & Butlers	Bass Charrington						Interbrew	Coors/Molson Coors		
Charrington's	Charrington & Moss		Charrington & Co								Charrington United	Bass Charrington						Interbrew	Coors/Molson Coors		
John Jeffrey, Edinburgh	John Jeffrey & Co									UB/NB	Charrington United	Bass Charrington						Interbrew	"		C&C
Edinburgh Utd, Edinburgh	Edinburgh United						"			UB/NB	Charrington United	Bass Charrington						Interbrew	"		C&C
Hammond's, Bradford	Hammond's									UB/NB	Charrington United	Bass Charrington						Interbrew	"		C&C
Hope & Anchor, Sheffield	Hope & Anchor									UB/NB	Charrington United	Bass Charrington						Interbrew	"		C&C
Catterall's, Poulton	Catterall & Swarbrick										Charrington United	Bass Charrington						Interbrew	"		C&C
Catterall's, Blackpool						Catterall & Swarbrick					Charrington United	Bass Charrington						Interbrew	"		C&C
Tennent's	Tennent's										"	Bass Charrington						Interbrew	"		C&C
Stones, Sheffield	William Stones											"						Interbrew	Interbrew/InBev		
Hewitt Brothers	Hewitt Brothers											"						Interbrew	Interbrew/InBev		
Henry Hall, Alton	Henry Hall			Courage										"				Interbrew	Coors/Molson Coors		
Highgate, Walsall			Highgate Brewery				M&B/Bass										Aston Manor Brewery		Global Star		
Okells	Okells																				
Castletown	Castletown														"						
Palmers	JC & RH Palmer																				
Randalls	Randalls																				
Shepherd Neame	Shepherd Neame																				
Sam Smith's, Tadcaster	Samuel Smith																				
St Austell, St Austell	St Austell																				
Thwaites, Lancaster	Thwaites																				
Lancaster, Lancaster	Lancaster Brewery																				
Timothy Taylor	Timothy Taylor																				
Traquair												Traquair House									
Vaux, Sunderland	Vaux Brewery																	Double Maxim			
Wards, Sheffield	Wards Brewing Company												"					Double Maxim			
Wadworths, Devizes		Wadworths																			
