= George Taylor (artist) =

English painter

- Born: 1914; Bromsgrove, Worcestershire, England
- Died: January 1996 (aged 81–82); Bury St Edmunds, Suffolk, England
- Occupation: Commercial artist
- Known for: Pub signs

George Taylor (1914–1996) was an English artist. He has prominence for his functional pub signs in a distinctive hybrid modern-meets-traditional style.

Taylor trained as a signwriter in Birmingham. In the 1930s he worked for a signwriting company in his native town Bromsgrove, where his commissions included designing film posters for the Rank Organisation.

From 1941 to 1945, during World War II, he was sent to Cairo to work as a camouflage artist (painter).

After the war, until his retirement in 1976, he was director of a silk-screen printing company in Surrey. He and his wife Sylvia then moved to Yorkshire and he painted over 100 pub signs for these businesses across that region. In 1984 his family moved to Bury St Edmunds in Suffolk in which area he continued work for his most frequent client, the Greene King Brewery who are based there — he created more than 250 signs for Greene King pubs. He was main sign artist for a period for the Wem Brewing Company based in the market town of Wem in Shropshire. He died in January 1996.

In 2008, his widow presented Greene King with a collection of his miniature, proof, pub sign designs, painted for the approval of clients before being copied as full-sized designs. They were put on exhibition in the brewhouse in his new hometown. In December 2011, she displayed some of his miniatures on the BBC's Antiques Roadshow programme.
