= Old Speckled Hen =

Beer made by Morland Brewery at Abingdon-on-Thames, Oxfordshire, England

- The Old Speckled Hen logo
- Manufacturer: Morland Brewery; Greene King Brewery
- Origin: Abingdon-on-Thames, Oxfordshire, England
- Introduced: 1979
- Colour: Amber
- Website: oldspeckledhen.co.uk

Old Speckled Hen is a bitter beer originally made by the Morland Brewery, but now brewed by Greene King Brewery. Old Speckled Hen was first brewed in 1979 in Abingdon-on-Thames, Oxfordshire in England, to commemorate the 50th anniversary of the MG car factory there on 30 November 1979. Since 2000, when Greene King bought Morland and closed down the Abingdon brewery, it has been made in Greene King's Bury St Edmunds brewery. It is available in more than twenty countries in bottles, cans and on tap from cask and keg. The brand has been expanded to include Old Crafty Hen, a 6.5% ABV ale, Hens Tooth, a 6.5% ABV ale, Old Golden Hen, a golden coloured 4.1% beer, and Old Hoppy Hen, a 4.2% ABV pale ale.

== History ==
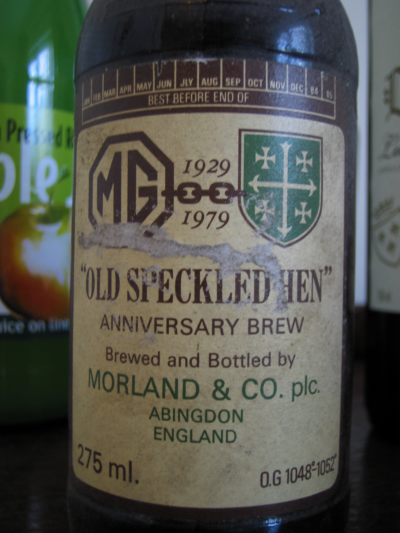
An original bottle of Old Speckled Hen

Old Speckled Hen took its name from a 1927 experimental car called the MG Featherlight Saloon. The car's body was made of a wooden frame covered with gold-speckled black cellulosed fabric. It was used as a runaround for workers in the MG factory in Abingdon and was nicknamed the "owd speck'ld un". In 1979, the MG Factory celebrated the 50th anniversary of the MG Car Company's move from Oxford to Abingdon. They asked Abingdon brewers Morland & Co to create a special commemorative beer for the occasion, for which they would suggest the name and would also design the octagonal label.

Head Brewer Jim Dymore-Brown used a recipe that had been developed by Daniel O'Leary (brewer and former cooper) for this. The beer, an amber coloured pale ale, was brewed at a gravity of 1050 to denote the 50th anniversary. Twenty-five barrels, 1200 dozen half-pints bottles, were produced, mostly for the promotional activities at MG, but also for limited distribution to Morland houses in the Abingdon area. What had been produced as a one-off celebration brew, proved so popular that a second batch had to be brewed in time for the main celebrations which were to be held in Abingdon over the weekend of the actual anniversary.

After the MG factory closed in 1980, production declined and Old Speckled Hen was almost exclusively available only in pubs operated by Morland due to financial constraints and a different direction being taken by the brewery, which believed its future lay in the production of lager. Within a few years, Morland began to re-explore ale production, reviving Old Speckled Hen and launching the draught version in 1990 with considerable success, with Old Speckled Hen proving to be a beer that Morland could market outside their own estate.

In January 1993, Old Speckled Hen was featured as beer reviewer Michael Jackson's "Beer of the Month" in his regular column for The Independent. The relaunch was thought to be behind an 8.9% interim rise in profits for Morland in June 1997.

Greene King announced in December 2003 that, in the light of what it called "foaming" sales of Old Speckled Hen in particular, it was expanding its brewing capacity, having previously been operating at 96% capacity.

Fiona Hope, Greene King's marketing director, speculated in April 2009 that Old Speckled Hen could follow GK's IPA and be made available in the so-called "dual pour font" whereby the tap version is available in two styles, though this was unconfirmed.

== Availability ==
Old Speckled Hen is available in bottles, cans, casks, and kegs. The alcohol by volume of both the canned and bottled versions is 4.8%, making it a relatively strong, premium ale, however, the cask version was reduced from 5.2% to 4.5% ABV in 2006 to make it more of a "sessionable beer", resulting in a 60% increase in availability. Upon acquiring Morland, Greene King almost immediately decided to place emphasis on multi packs, rather than the sale of individual bottles and cans. In 2023, due to the increased production costs, the ABV content in both the bottled and canned versions of Old Speckled Hen was reduced from 5% to 4.8% ABV. According to the website, this was an attempt by Greene King to maintain customer affordability on the beer by paying less on the excise duty to accommodate the increased production costs, whilst still offering the same great taste.

== Marketing ==
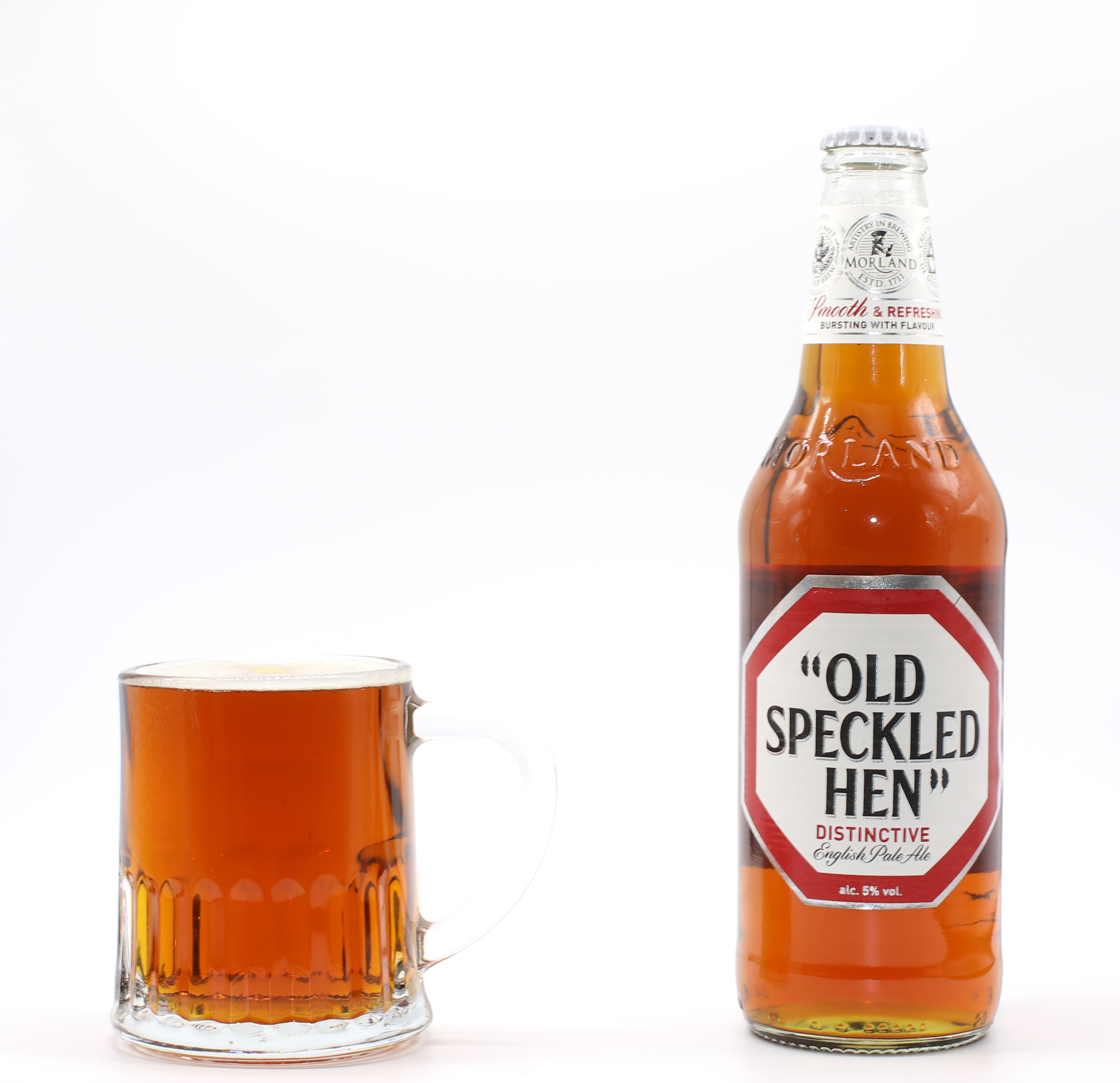
A glass and bottle of Old Speckled Hen in 2020

Old Speckled Hen was, in 2008 and 2009, rebranded to appeal to a younger audience. As part of this, Greene King, through the Speckled Hen brand, has embarked on a marketing campaign involving sponsorship by the Northamptonshire and Derbyshire County Cricket Clubs and, most notably, the digital television channel Dave. The ten-second adverts, which portray a "crafty fox" seeking out an "elusive hen" and feature the catchphrase "It's different, But it's not a hen", are shown eight times per hour after 9PM on weekdays. Greene King's marketing director said of the deal, "The fit between Dave and Old Speckled Hen is absolutely spot on. Both offer something a little different, witty, and quintessentially British". The Old Speckled Hen livery also appears on fifteen black cabs in the Central London area.

Old Speckled Hen's advertising was originated by (now defunct) Saatchi Group agency, RPG in 1987. Terry Symonds, head of RPG Design, designed the new label which was based on the MG Octagon to show the link between MG and Morland. After having researched the brand, he discovered that landlords were often asked about the name, so he suggested carrying a label on the reverse of the bottle, that would tell the story. Terry and his team were responsible for rebranding bitter as 1711 (the year of Morland's foundation) and best bitter as 'Old Masters' (a nod to George Morland, a renowned artist and painter). RPG Design also created a new identity to be carried through pub fascias, vehicle livery etc.

Another advertising campaign was part of a drive to appeal to younger drinkers which has also included the weakening of the draught version and the introduction of the advertising slogan "a not so traditional English ale" which featured on an oil painting reproduced in broadsheet newspapers and at 250 London Underground stations. Additionally, the campaign revamped the brand's website, again aimed at a younger audience. The campaign was masterminded by Fallon Worldwide, although the contract was later taken up by the Miles Calcraft Briginshaw Duffy agency, who devised the television campaign, which cost £3.5 million.
According to Rob Flanagan, brand controller for Old Speckled Hen, the aim of the campaign was to attract up to 3 million new drinkers to the brand, while appearing to retain its "niche" status amongst established customers.

The relaunch was successful, with Greene King reporting "major success".

In 2014, Grey Global Group relaunched the campaign featuring the fox character, now known as Henry, ranting in a pub about events in the calendar. He is voiced by comedian Simon Evans.

In 2022, the campaign was relaunched with Henry telling stories about his adventures, while in a pub frequented by anthropomorphic animals. The adverts were written at House 337 and animated at Partizan.

== Exports ==
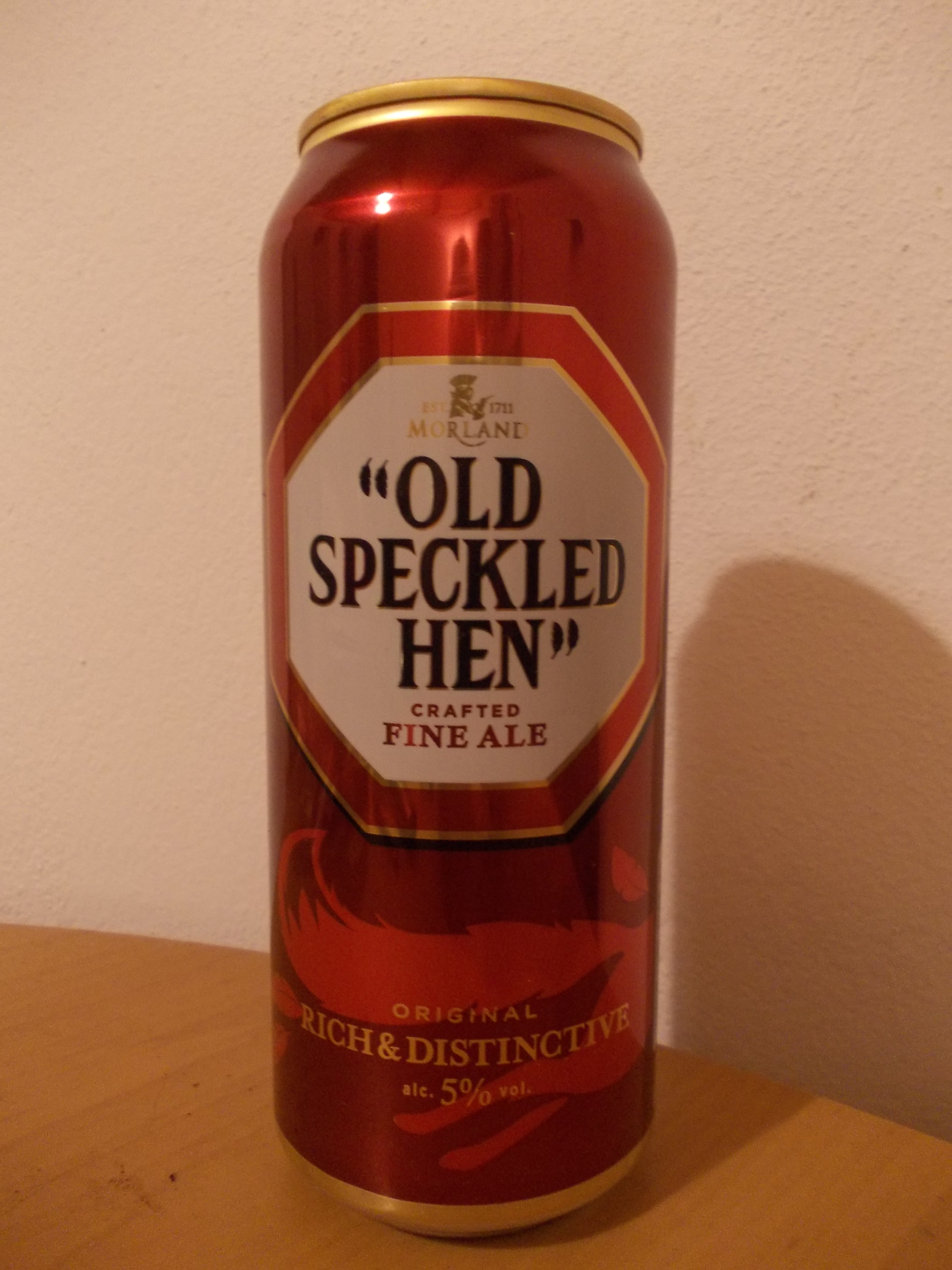
500 ml can of Old Speckled Hen

The Hen has been exported to over 40 countries, including Singapore, where 200 pints a day are sold in a single pub. In the US, it is available in 32 of the 50 states and reportedly popular in New York City. Old Speckled Hen is also available in Australia, Belgium, Brazil, Canada, Denmark, Finland, France, Ireland, Italy, India, New Zealand, Norway, Peru, Spain, Sweden, The Netherlands and Russia.

== Old Crafty Hen ==
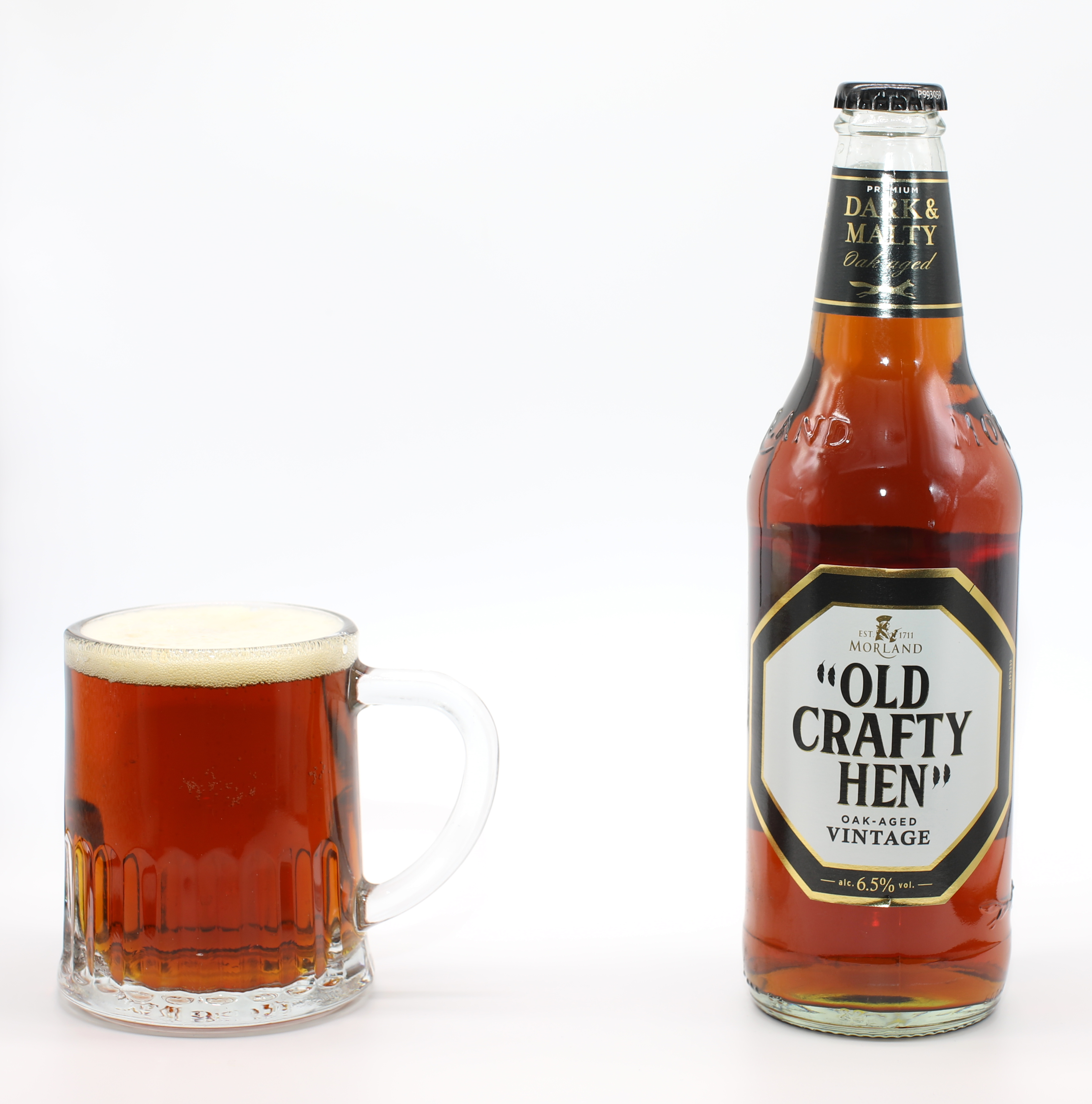
A Glass and bottle of Old Crafty Hen, the super premium version of Speckled Hen

Old Crafty Hen is a 6.5% ABV 'super premium' version of Old Speckled Hen. Released in September 2008, it is marketed as combining the tastes of Speckled Hen and a former Greene King brand, 'Old 5X'. Neil Jardine, of Greene King claims that Crafty Hen is "a genuinely exceptional beer". Crafty Hen is significantly stronger than Speckled Hen, having been matured for several years, giving it a less pronounced flavour that varies from one batch to the next. Old Crafty was listed as number three in The Independent's Top Ten Best Winter Ales.

== Old Golden Hen ==
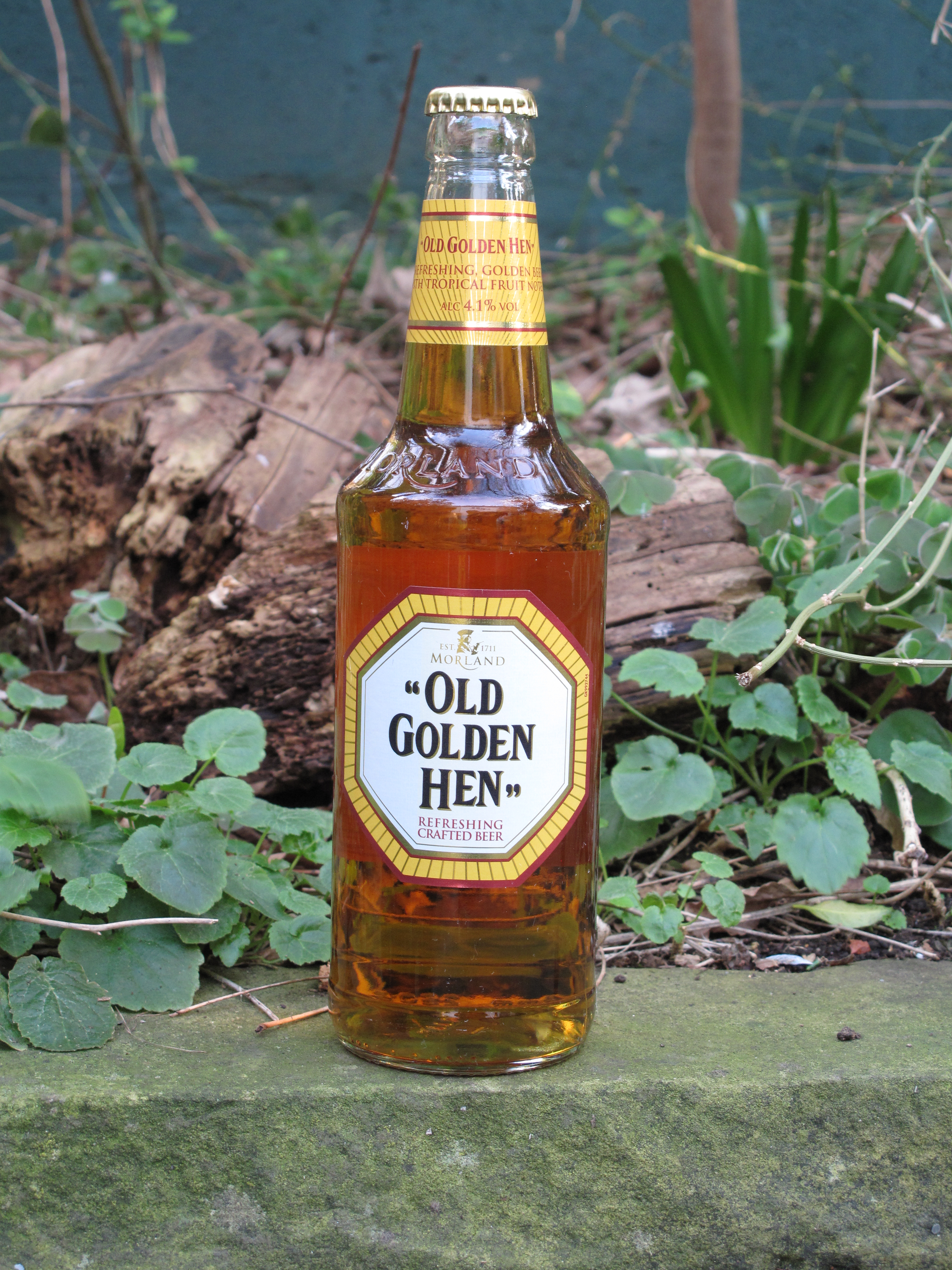
A bottle of Old Golden Hen

Old Golden Hen was launched in August 2011, it is a light golden ale. Crafted by the master brewer of "Old Speckled Hen", this light golden beer is brewed using pale malts and Tasmanian Galaxy hops giving a light golden colour. A year after being launched in 2011, Old Golden Hen won a Gold Quality Award at the 2012 Monde Selection’s World Quality Selections The brand became the third member of the Old Speckled Hen family to win a Monde Selection Quality Award.

== Old Hoppy Hen ==
Old Hoppy Hen was launched in April 2014 and is a hoppy pale ale, inspired by the US craft beer scene. It is made with pale and crystal malts, as well as rye malt, and Chinook hops.

== Old Speckled Hen Low Alcohol ==
Brewed with Pale and Crystal malts alongside Challenger, First Gold and Goldings hops, Old Speckled Hen Low Alcohol attempts to evoke the tastes and aromas of the original Old Speckled Hen but with low ABV.

== GlutenFree Old Speckled Hen ==
The gluten free beer is brewed with its usual quality ingredients and to its normal recipe, with the reduction in gluten content achieved through an innovation in the brewing process. A bespoke product stream ensures the beers remain segregated and guarantees that they can be designated as gluten free.

== Old Master Hen ==
The latest addition to Greene King's range of Hen beers, this limited edition ale is bottle conditioned and brewed with malt, hops, pure water and yeast. The tastes and aromas of this beer is full-bodied and warming, with masses of characteristic toffee and fruit, notes of citrus and orange, and a traditional English hop bitterness. The ABV content in this beer is 7%, the highest in Greene King's range of Hen beers.

== Old Session Hen ==
In April 2024 Old Session Hen with an ABV of 3.4% was introduced.
