= Hungry Horse =

British pub chain

- Type: Food and Drink
- Industry: Pub; Restaurant
- Founded: 1995
- Founder: Greene King
- Headquarters: Bury St Edmunds; Suffolk, England
- Number of locations: 250+ (August 2026)
- Area served: Great Britain
- Owner: Greene King
- Website: hungryhorse.co.uk

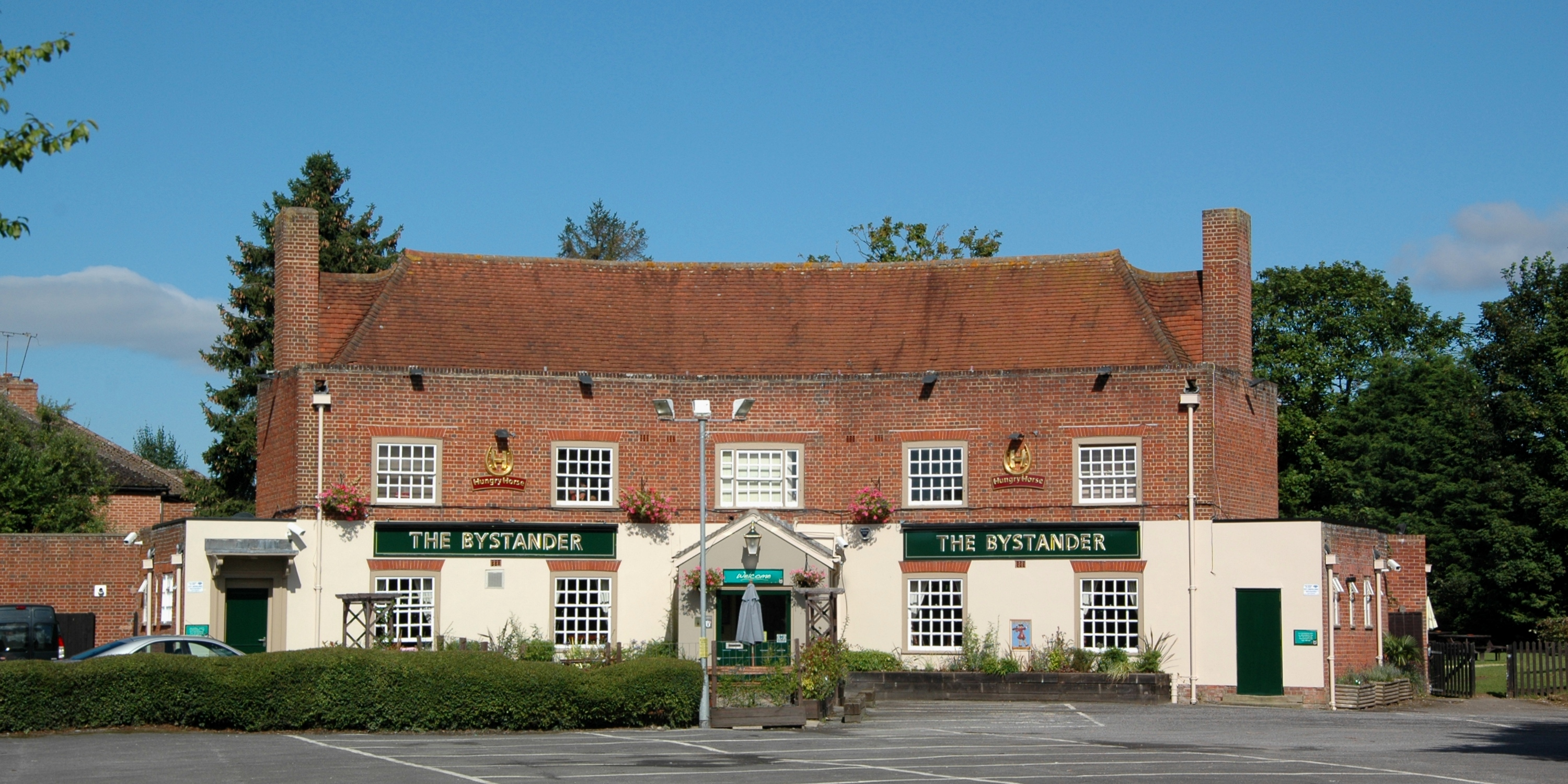
The Bystander Hungry Horse pub, Wootton, Oxfordshire (August 2012)

Hungry Horse is a chain of 246 pub restaurants in England, Wales and Scotland which is owned by Greene King. It was first established in 1995, and promotes itself as offering low cost meals for families and groups.

== History ==
A new winter menu was launched in October 2015, with chefs spending one day at South Cheshire College preparing dishes for the chain’s new winter menu. The chain launched its vegan menu across all the restaurants in the United Kingdom in September 2018.

== Double Doughnut controversy ==
The chain was criticised in November 2014 for introducing a new burger called the Double Doughnut which at 1,996 calories contained nearly 100% of the recommended daily energy intake for adult women.

It also contains 53g of saturated fat (the recommended daily allowance is 20g for women, and 30g for men) and 8.2g of salt (recommended daily allowance for adults is 6g).
