= Hartford End =

Hamlet in Essex, England

Coordinates: 51.831°N 0.449°E

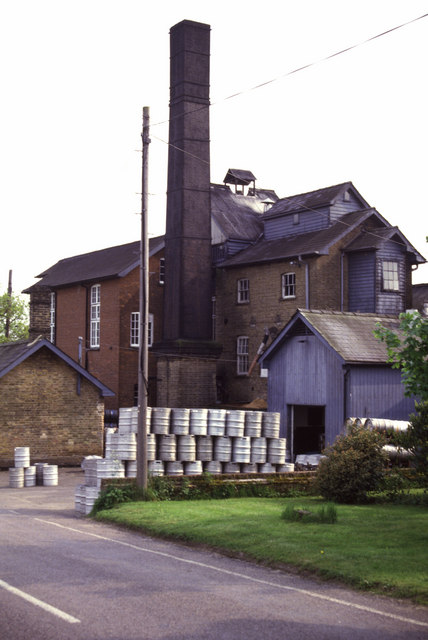

- Location within Essex
- Civil parish: Felsted
- District: Uttlesford
- Shire county: Essex
- Region: East
- Country: England
- Sovereign state: United Kingdom
- Police: Essex
- Fire: Essex
- Ambulance: East of England

Hartford End is a hamlet in the civil parish of Felsted and the Uttlesford district of Essex, England. The hamlet is on the B1417 road approximately 2 miles (3 km) from the village of Felsted.

The headquarters of Ridley's Brewery was in Hartford End.
