= Hickory's Smokehouse =

Southern-style British restaurant chain

Hickory's (ROS) Ltd
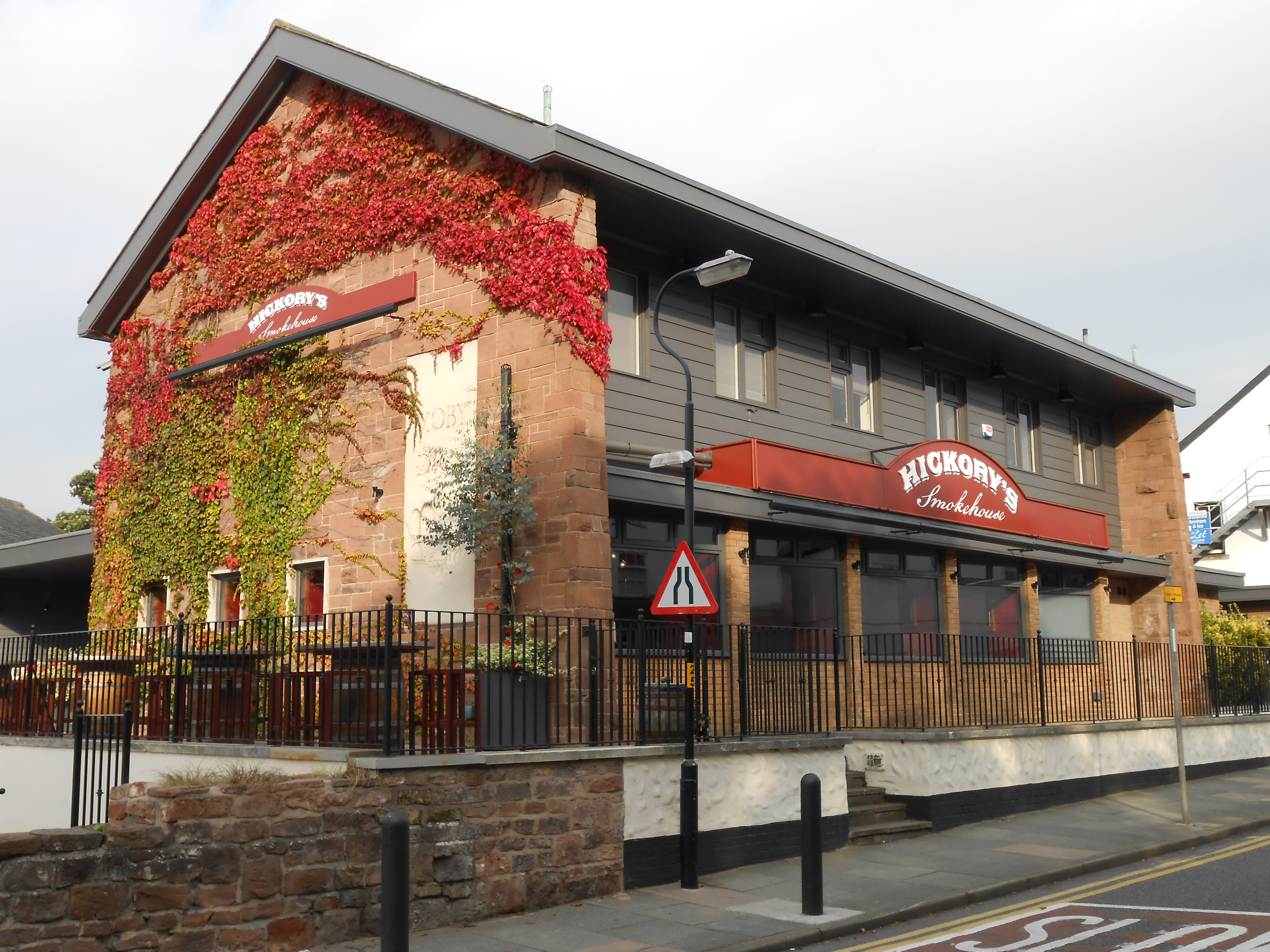
- A Hickory's Smokehouse location in West Kirby, Wirral, Merseyside, England
- Trade name: Hickory's Smokehouse
- Type: Private
- Industry: Casual dining
- Founded: 2010
- Number of locations: 38
- Key people: Neil McDonnell
- Owner: Greene King
- Website: hickorys.co.uk

Hickory's (ROS) Ltd, trading as Hickory's Smokehouse, is a British BBQ smokehouse restaurant group founded in 2010 in Chester in the North West of England. It has since expanded to 38 sites across the United Kingdom.

Their menu is known for its Southern-inspired dishes and features burgers, corn dogs, Memphis-style back ribs, and smoked brisket.

Each restaurant features an 'Ole Hickory' smoker, imported from Missouri.

== History ==
Hickory's Smokehouse was founded in 2010 with the original site in Chester by Neil McDonnell who took inspiration from a road trip through America, visiting Texas, South Carolina, and Tennessee.

In 2016, the group's location in Wall Heath, a Grade II-listed former nightclub suffered from damage to its roof after an electrical fault caused a fire.

=== Greene King ===
In 2022, the pub group Greene King acquired Hickory's Smokehouse, investing £25 million into the chain. The previous investors, Piper, who had supported the company since 2014 with an investment of £6 million, exited their investment.

== Charity ==
The restaurant group supports a number of charities including Cash for Kids.
