= Greene King =

British brewery and pub chain

Greene King Limited
- Type: Subsidiary (Private limited company)
- Traded as: LSE: GNK
- Industry: Alcoholic beverage
- Founded: 1799
- Headquarters: Bury St Edmunds, England, UK
- Key people: Nick Mackenzie (CEO)
- Products: Beer
- Revenue: £2,176.7 million (2018)
- Operating income: £373.1 million (2018)
- Net income: £162.5 million (2018)
- Owner: CK Asset Holdings
- Subsidiaries: Chef & Brewer; Hickory's Smokehouse; Hungry Horse
- Website: greeneking.co.uk

Greene King Limited is a British pub and brewing company founded in 1799, currently based in Bury St Edmunds, Suffolk. The company also owns brands including Hungry Horse and Farmhouse Inns, as well as other pubs, restaurants and hotels. It was listed on the London Stock Exchange (LSE), until it was acquired by CK Assets in October 2019.

Its best known beers are Greene King IPA and Abbot Ale, the third and fifth highest selling cask ales in Britain.

== History ==
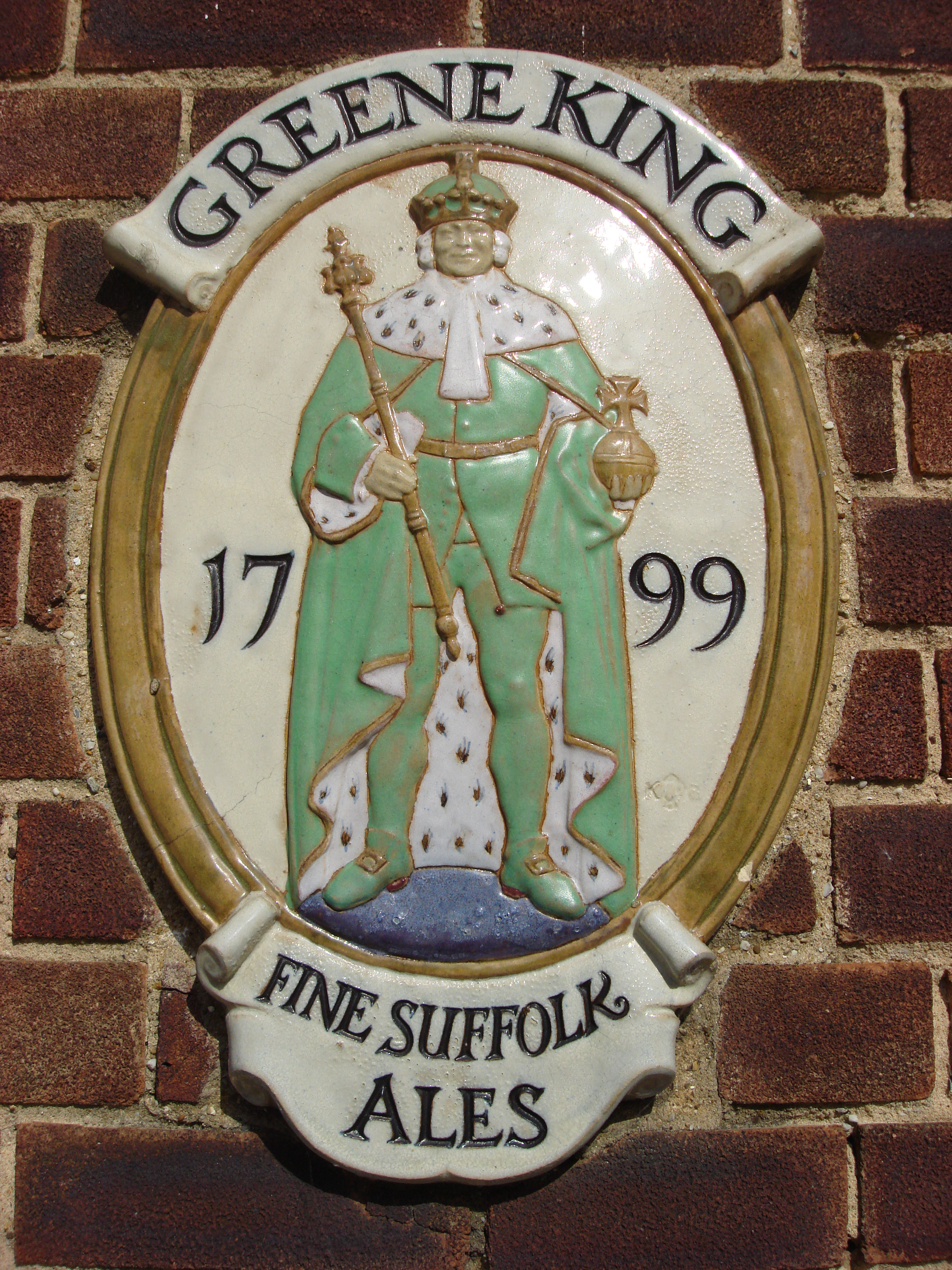
Greene King plaque on the side of a pub in Sudbury, Suffolk

The brewery was founded by Benjamin Greene in Bury St. Edmunds in 1801. (Note: Benjamin Greene initially founded a brewing business in 1801 with John Clark in Bury St Edmunds. Then in 1806 he dissolved that partnership and established a new venture with William Buck at the Westgate Brewery. It was this venture that became Greene King.) In Richard Wilson's biographical analysis of the Greene family, he credits various family members for being able to achieve distinction in the worlds of business and banking, literature (Graham Greene, for example) and broadcasting in the nineteenth and twentieth centuries.'

In 1836 Edward Greene took over the business and in 1887 it merged with Frederick William King's brewing business to create Greene King.

Greene King has grown via mergers and acquisitions, including Rayments Brewery (1961), the Magic Pub Company (1996), Hungry Horse (1996), Morland Brewery (1999), Old English Inns (2001), Morrells (2002), a large part of the Laurel Pub Company (2004), Ridley's Brewery (2005), Belhaven Brewery (2005), Hardys and Hansons (2006), the Loch Fyne fish restaurant chain (2007), Cloverleaf (2011), Realpubs (2011), the Capital Pub Company (2011) and the Spirit Pub Company (2015).

The Spirit acquisition, where Greene King bought Spirit for £773.6m, took the total number of Greene King sites to 3,116, brought 14 brands together and made Greene King the largest managed pub company in the UK. It was completed on 23 June 2015.

It was announced in November 2018 that Rooney Anand would be stepping down from his role as CEO after 14 years in the position.

In 2019 the Hong Kong based CK Assets announced the proposed take over of Greene King, which shareholders had to approve. According to the Financial Times, the holding company took the view that the pubs owned by Greene King are an asset that is safe from potential recession. Analyst David Blennerhassett told the FT that CK Assets has a track record of buying such assets in the UK and he does not expect it to sell Greene King later as a bet on the falling pound. The takeover was approved by the High Court in October 2019.

In March 2026, Greene King announced plans to sell 150 pubs to focus on its core portfolio.

== Operations ==
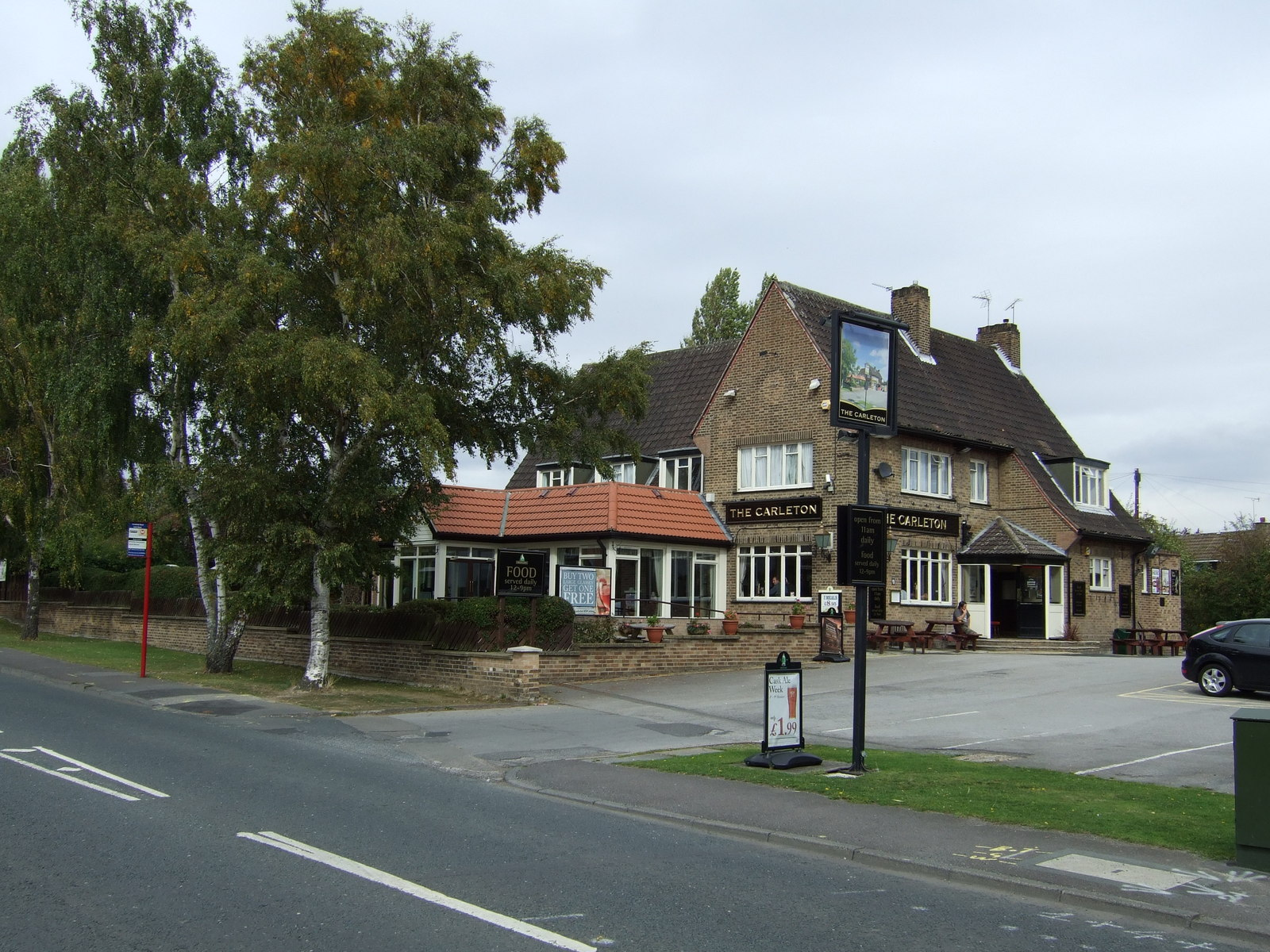
The Carleton, a Greene King pub in Pontefract, West Yorkshire

The Greene King brewery in Bury St Edmunds produces beers branded in the names of breweries now closed, including Morland (Old Speckled Hen), Ruddles, Hardys & Hanson Kimberley Ale and Tolly Cobbold. The Belhaven Brewery in Dunbar continues to operate in Scotland.

The group operates 3,100 pubs, restaurants and hotels:

- Its retail division is split between its destination pubs and restaurants (with brands including Hungry Horse, Loch Fyne, Taylor Walker and Metropolitan Pub Company) and its local pubs. Its strategy is to open further retail outlets.
- Its pub partners division has leased, tenanted and franchised pubs. Its strategy is to reduce the numbers of these outlets.

== Visitor centre ==
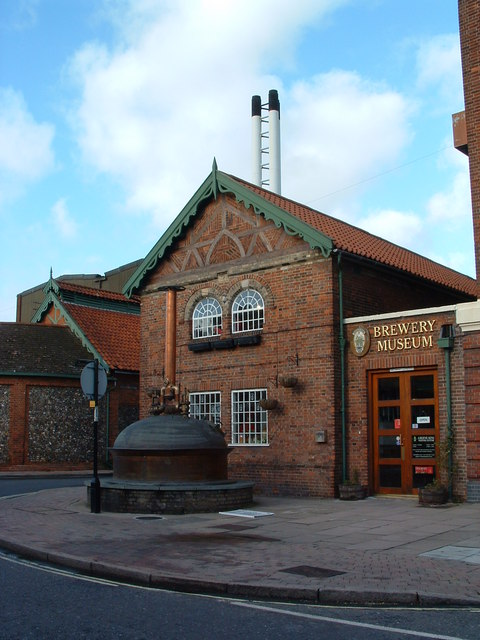
Greene King's Brewery Museum, shown in 2006

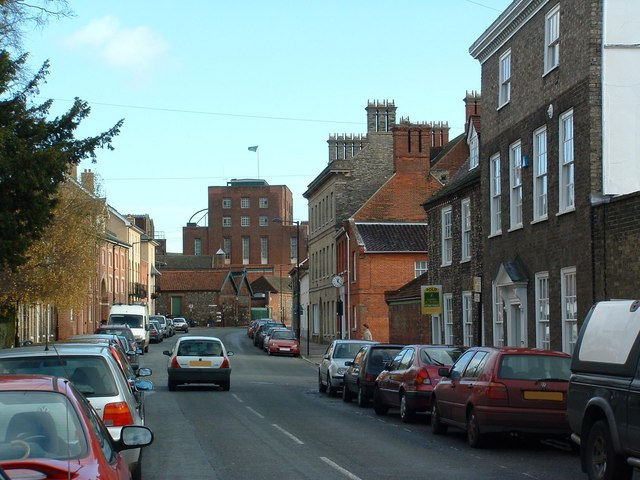
The Greene King main brewery, seen from Westgate Street

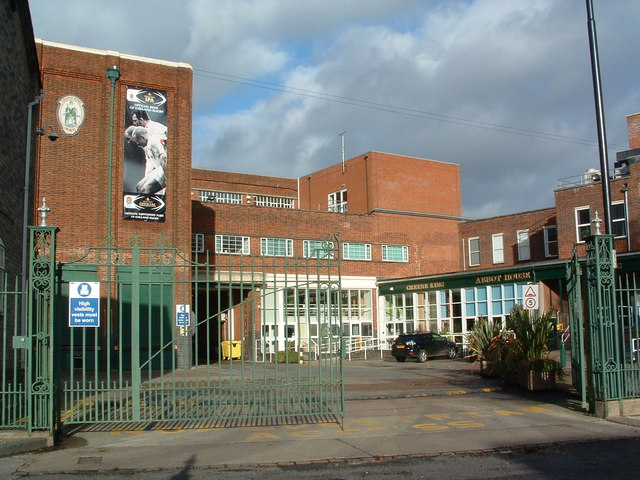
The Greene King main brewery

There is a visitor centre next to the brewery, and tours are run regularly throughout the week. The brewery has an exhibition of pub sign artwork by George Taylor, who designed over 250 such signs for Greene King pubs.

== People ==
Greene King has been supporting apprenticeships since 2011 through its Greene King Apprenticeship Programme. Since launch, the scheme has processed some 9,000 apprentices.

In 2016, Greene King launched the Get into Hospitality Programme in partnership with The Prince's Trust. The aim of the programme is to address the skills and experience gaps that prevent unemployed people from getting into work. Those who successfully complete and graduate from the programme are offered a role onto the Greene King Apprenticeship Programme.

In 2017, Greene King launched the Craft Academy, an 18-month brewing venture led by apprentices. Through the programme, apprentices earn while they learn about brewing, design and marketing. Through the scheme, they will gain a Level 3 NVQ Diploma in Sales. The first five beers from the Craft Academy were launched at Craft Beer Rising Festival in London and include; Over Easy (3.8% session IPA), Big Bang IPA (5.6% bold and citrusy IPA), Bitter Sweet (6% black IPA), Desert Ryeder (4.8% rye beer) and High & Dry (5% dry hop lager).

== Awards ==
In March 2016, Greene King won Best Managed Pub Company (51+ sites) at the 2016 Publican Awards. Greene King's chief executive, Rooney Anand, also won Business of the Year Award at the Publican Awards 2016. In March 2017, Greene King Pub Partners won Best Tenanted & Leased Pub Company (201+ sites) at the 2017 Publican Awards.

== Criticism ==
Greene King's ongoing business expansion has sometimes been the subject of criticism. As a result of its active acquisition policy, it has come to be known by beer protesters as "Greedy King". The growing consumer reaction to Greene King buying out smaller breweries was demonstrated towards the end of 2006 when a pub in Lewes, East Sussex started a well-publicised protest against Greene King for removing the locally produced Harvey's Sussex Best Bitter from sale, while continuing to sell other guest beers.

In January 2014, the Lass O'Gowrie, which had been named "Best Pub in Britain" at the Great British Pub Awards in 2012, closed following a dispute over rent that led to the landlord's departure. The landlord had reported losing around 40% of trade after the BBC relocated to MediaCityUK and had secured a rent reduction at an independent tribunal before leaving the business after a disagreement with the brewery.

Greene King has also been criticised for removing many traditional and historic pub signs as part of rebranding schemes.

In 2021, residents of Linlithgow launched a petition aimed at preventing Greene King from changing the name of "The Black Bitch" pub to "The Black Hound". The term "black bitches" is traditionally used for natives of the town, and an image of a black bitch (a female dog) appears on the town's coat of arms. Greene King argued that the name "The Black Bitch" had "racist and offensive connotations".

On 27 January 2024, the Caribbean nation of St Kitts and Nevis announced plans to seek slavery reparations from Greene King, due to its founder Benjamin Greene's historical ownership of 231 enslaved people in St Kitts. Talks have been scheduled between St Kitts and Nevis officials and Greene King.

== Beers ==
=== Greene King ===
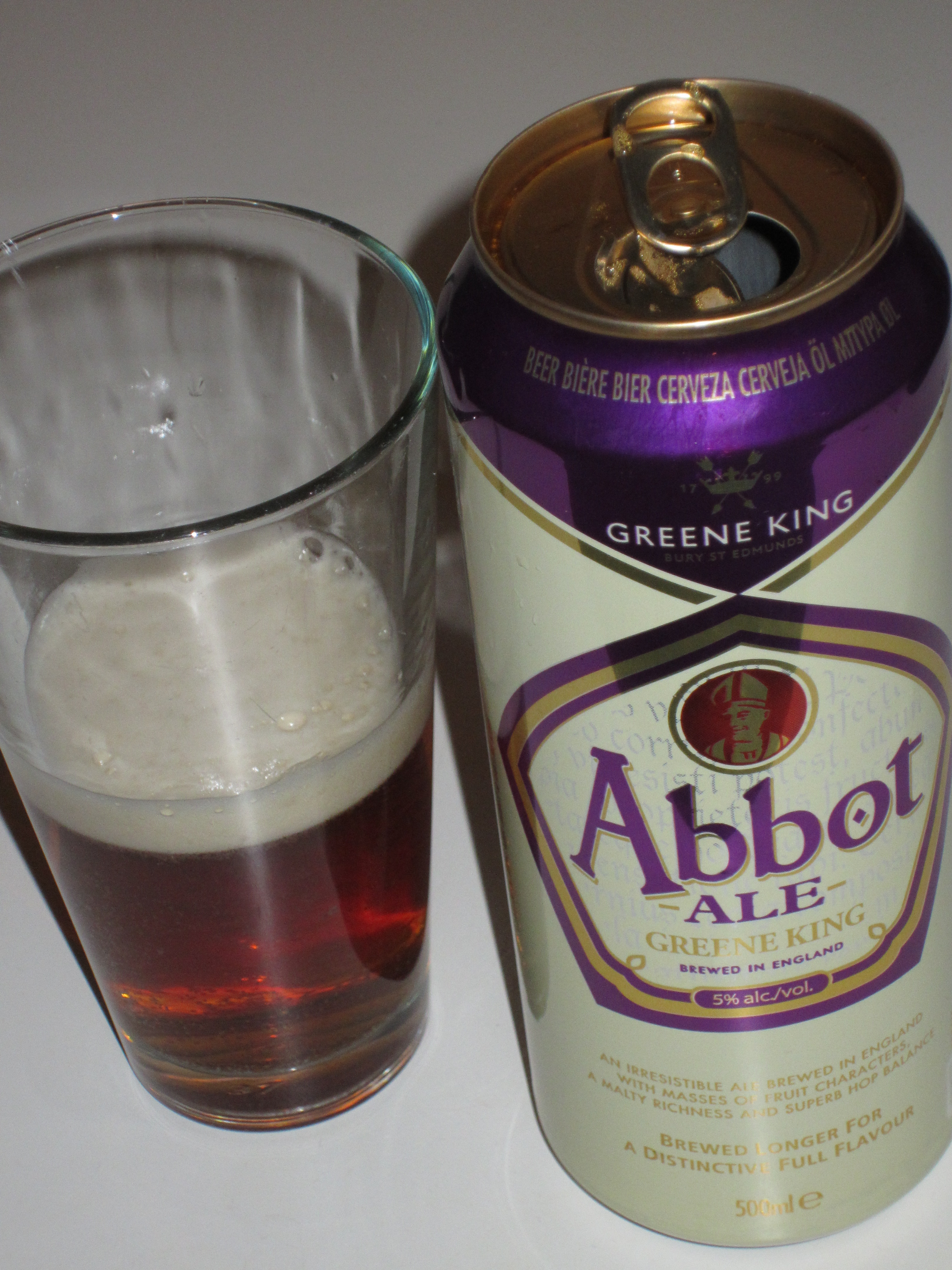
Abbot Ale

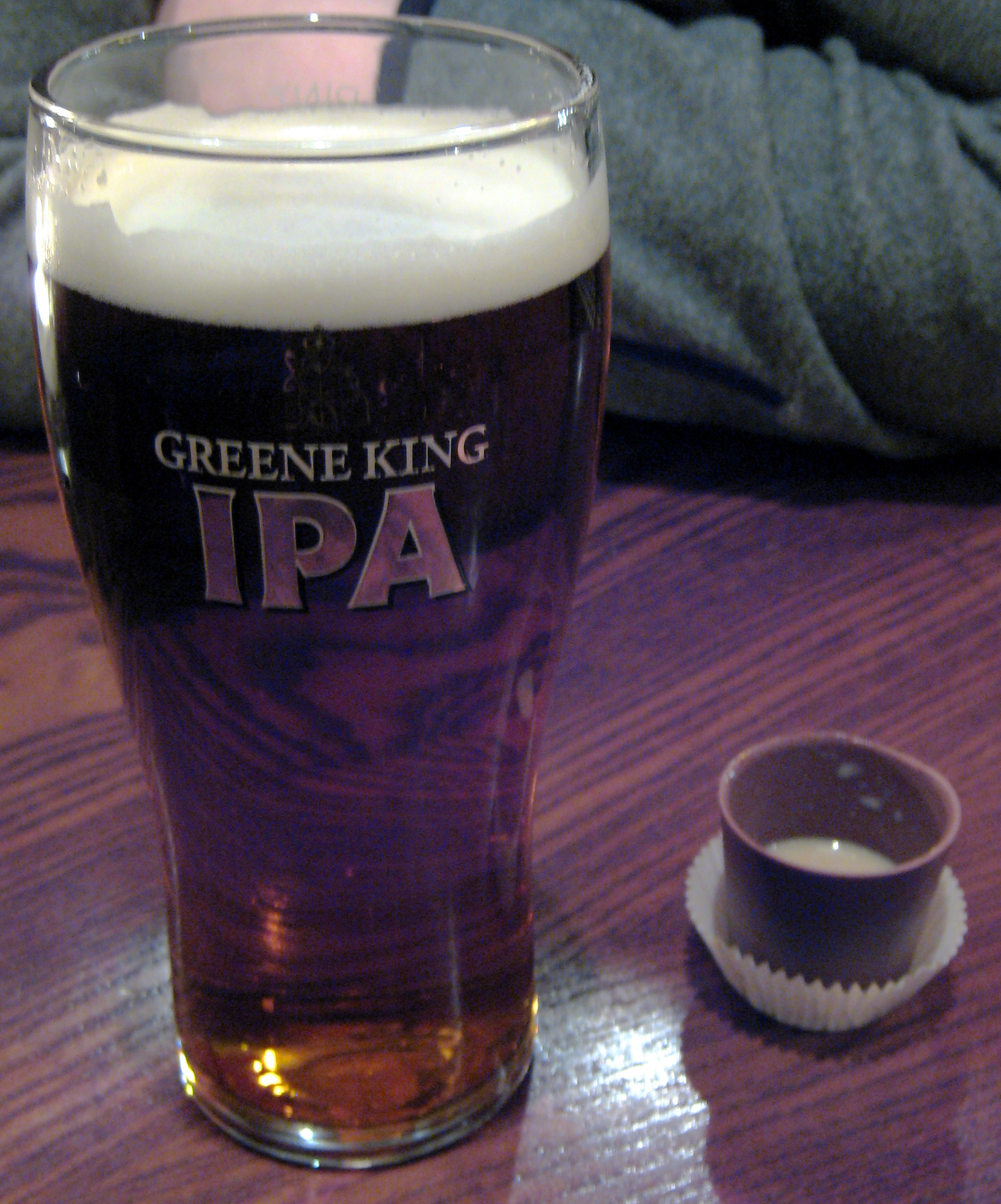
A pint of Greene King IPA

- Abbot Ale – A premium bitter (5.0% abv) first brewed in the 1950s. The ingredients are pale, crystal and amber malts; with First Gold, Challenger and Fuggles hops – the Fuggles being late-hopped. In 2007 Abbot Reserve (6.5% abv) was introduced as a winter special in the cask, with year-round availability in the bottle.
- Greene King IPA – An English IPA (3.4% abv) served in pubs and cans available from supermarkets and off-licences nationally. It is made using Challenger and First Gold hops and using pale and crystal malt. Greene King IPA controversially won the Gold award at the 2004 Campaign for Real Ale (CAMRA) Great British Beer Festival in the Bitter category and runner-up in the Champion Beer of Britain category. In 2009, Greene King began to roll out a new form of dispense which allows customers to choose either a "Northern" or a "Southern" head on their beer. In 2012, two extensions of the brand were launched: Gold and Reserve.
- IPA Export – A stronger cask bitter (5.0% abv) IPA available from off-licences in bottles, also made using Challenger and English First Gold hops.
- Olde Suffolk/Strong Suffolk Vintage – A strong old ale (6% abv) that is a blend of two ales, one being aged in oak for two years. It is available in bottles.
- St Edmunds – A crisp golden ale (4.2% abv) available in both bottles and cask nationally.
- Greene King XX Mild (3% ABV). A dark mild ale available on cask. Black and Crystal malts, Northdown hops.
- Ice Breaker – A pale ale (4.5% ABV) made with pale and amber malt, with using two notable American hops varieties Citra and Simcoe. Available on cask and limited distribution in Waitrose.

=== Hardy's and Hansons Kimberley Ale ===
- Olde Trip – A 4.3% Premium Ale. Named in honour of the Nottingham inn Ye Olde Trip To Jerusalem, which claims to be the oldest inn in Britain. As of September 2007 this was for sale in the Brewery Museum in 500ml bottles.

=== Belhaven ===
- Belhaven Best
- Belhaven Black
- Nowhere Pale Ale
- Twisted Grapefruit IPA

=== Morland ===
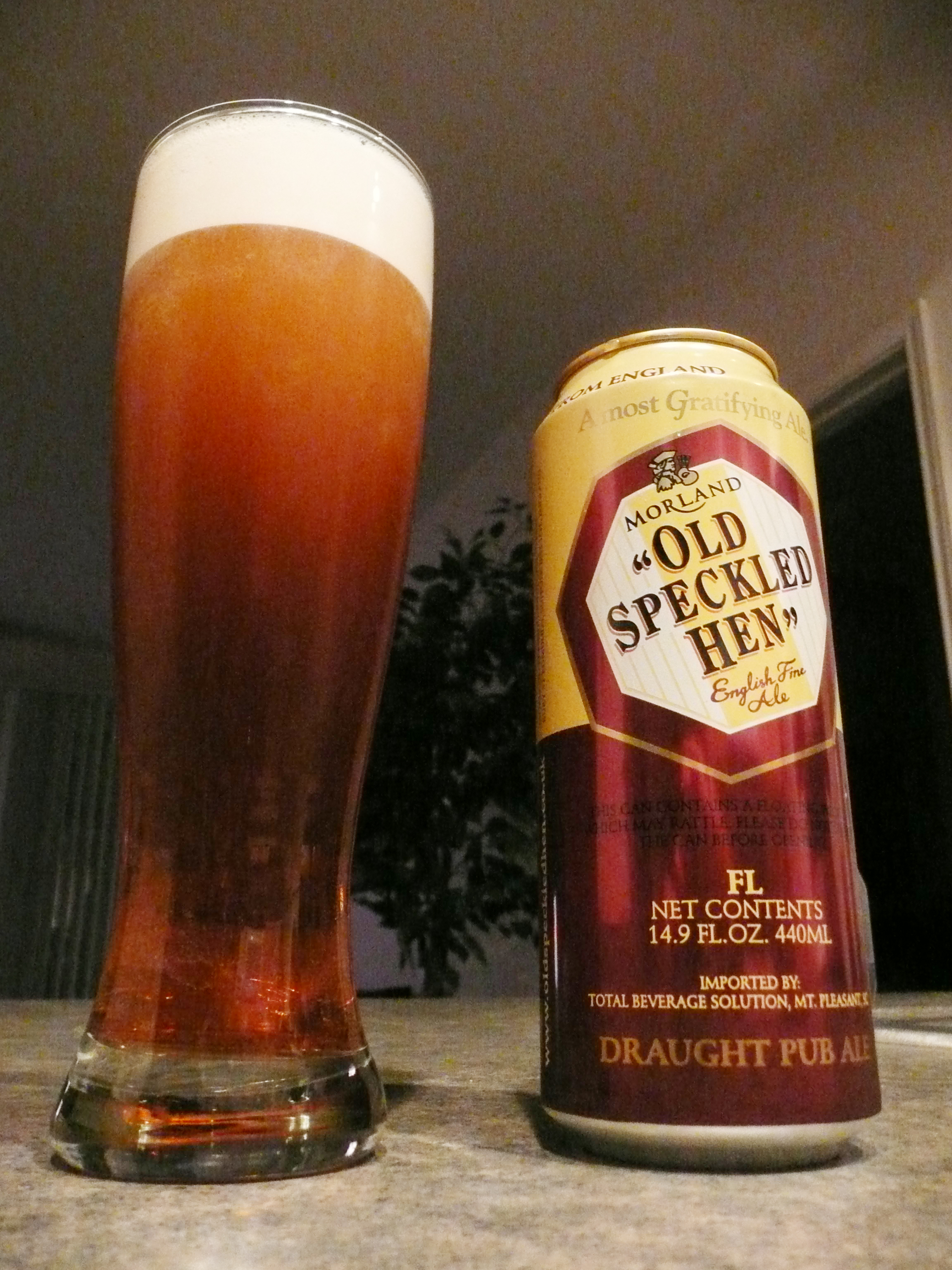
Can of Old Speckled Hen

- Old Speckled Hen is a popular bitter, available both as a cask ale and pasteurised in bottles. First brewed in 1979 by Morland Brewery in Abingdon, Oxfordshire to celebrate the 50th anniversary of the MG car company setting up in Abingdon, and named after the MG factory's MG car – the paint splattered Owld' Speckled 'Un. Brewed since 1999 by Greene King. Greene King has retained the strain of yeast first used in 1896. Old Golden Hen has received a coveted Monde Selection Award at the 2012 World Quality Selections. By receiving this award, the Old Golden Hen became the third and final member of the Old Speckled Hen family to win a Monde Selection quality award. In 2008, Greene King released a vintage oaked, super premium version of Old Speckled Hen, named Old Crafty Hen (6.5%).
- Hen's Tooth – A 6.5% bottle conditioned beer.
- Tanners Jack – abv 4.4% – Regularly seen across the country as a guest beer, often found in Wetherspoons, like many Greene King beers. Also available in 500ml bottle.
- Morland Original – abv 4.0% – Not seen as much as it was but often pops up in the old Morland heartlands. Also available in 500ml bottle.

=== Ridley's ===
- Old Bob (Formerly) – Originally brewed in Essex by Ridley's Brewery then later at Greene King's main brewery at Bury St. Edmunds after acquisition, it was a premium strong bitter, with a strength of 5.1% ABV and available both on cask and bottled. While it has not yet been confirmed as discontinued, it has not been available from Greene King's online shop since May 2022, and its listing has since been deleted.

=== Ruddles ===
- Ruddles County – A 4.7% bitter available on cask nationally.
- Ruddles Best Bitter – A 3.7% session bitter with national distribution.
- Ruddles Orchard – This 4.2% cask bitter consists of Ruddles County with the addition of apple concentrate. Also available pasteurised in bottles.

=== Trader Joe's ===
- The King's English – A 6.0% export IPA.
