= Benjamin Greene (brewer) =

Founder of Greene King breweries

- Born: 5 April 1780; Oundle, Northamptonshire, England
- Died: 26 November 1860 (aged 80); Bloomsbury, London, England
- Occupations: Businessman, brewer, planter, newspaper owner
- Known for: Founder of, Greene King
- Children: 13

Benjamin Greene (5 April 1780 – 26 November 1860) was an English businessman, newspaper owner and the founder of Greene King, one of the United Kingdom's largest brewing businesses. He later became the owner of multiple plantations in the British West Indies and supported slavery.

== Career ==
Benjamin Greene was born on 5 April 1780 in Oundle. He apprenticed at Whitbread, a British multinational hotel and restaurant company.

Greene initially founded a brewing business in 1801 with John Clark in Bury St Edmunds. Then in 1806 he dissolved that partnership and established a new venture with William Buck at the Westgate Brewery. It was this venture that became Greene King.

On the death of Sir Patrick Blake, 2nd Baronet he became the executor and, on the subsequent death of Sir Patrick's widow, the owner of some estates in the West Indies.

He was a supporter of the arts and in 1819 lent £5,000 to William Wilkins to build the Theatre Royal in Bury St Edmunds.

He acquired the Bury and Suffolk Herald in 1828 and as proprietor took an ultra-conservative position opposing both the Reform Bill and the Slavery Abolition Bill. This position attracted much criticism and three libel actions. He left Bury St Edmunds in 1836 and established with his son, Benjamin Greene & Son, West India merchants and shipowners, at 11 Mincing Lane, London.

He made three claims under the Slavery Abolition Act 1833 and was awarded a total of £4,033 15s 7d compensation for the 231 slaves he had owned on his estates in Montserrat and St Kitts. The Centre for the Study of the Legacies of British Slave-ownership at UCL describes him as an enthusiastic supporter of slavery, being particularly active between 1828 and 1833. In June 2020 Greene King announced that it would be paying reparations to BAME charities in recognition that he and by extension the company had benefited from slavery.

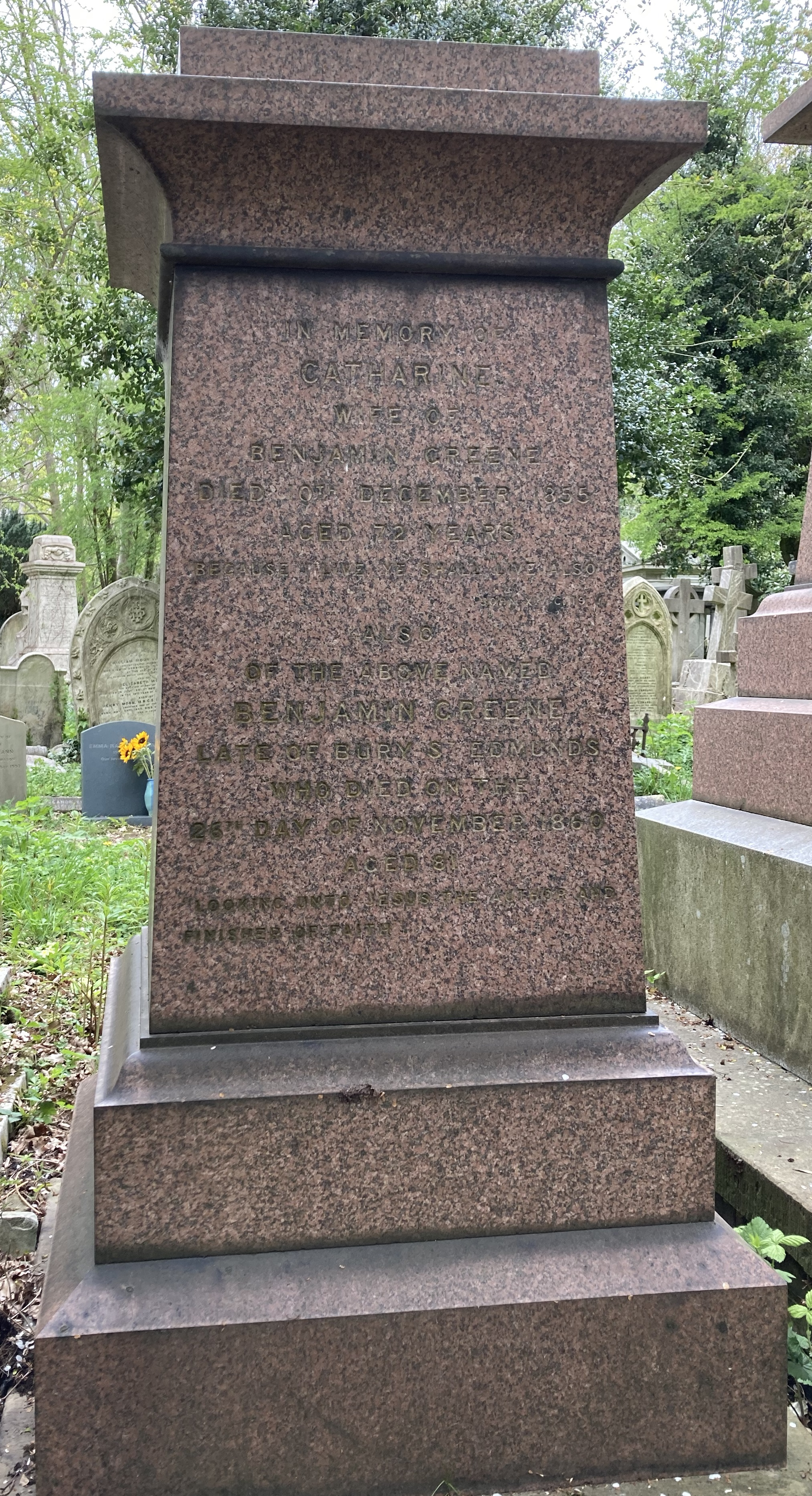
Grave of Benjamin Greene in Highgate Cemetery

He died at Russell Square in London on 26 November 1860 and is buried at Highgate Cemetery.

== Family ==
He was married twice: first in 1803 to Mary Maling and then in 1805 to Catherine Smith with whom he went on to have seven sons and six daughters including:

- Benjamin Buck (1808–1902) of Midgham House in Berkshire, Governor of the Bank of England
- Mary (1812–1870)
- Edward (1815–1891), Conservative MP for Bury St Edmunds (1865–1885) and Stowmarket (1886–1891); Took charge of running the brewery.
- William (1824–1881)
  - Charles Henry (1865–1942)
    - Graham Greene
    - Sir Hugh Greene
    - Raymond Greene
