= Wem Brewing Company =

Microbrewery in Wem, Shropshire, England

- Industry: Alcoholic beverage
- Predecessor: Hanby Ales
- Founded: 1988
- Founder: Peter Simmonds and Jack Hanby
- Headquarters: Wem, Shropshire, England
- Products: Beer
- Website: http://www.hanbyales.co.uk/

Wem Brewing Company (originally known as Hanby Ales Ltd) was a microbrewery in Wem, Shropshire. Established in 1988, it produced a range of ales.

== History ==
Hanby was founded in December 1988 by Peter Simmonds and Jack Hanby, who had previously worked for the Greenall Whitley brewery in Wem.

Initially located in rented accommodations in Aston Park, the brewery was unable to brew their own product, so the company sold other brewer's products wholesale.

The company began brewing their own ales in Easter 1989 once they had suitable premises.

Hanby Ales had a capacity of approximately 100 barrels per week.

The company's product range won a variety of awards from the Society of Independent Brewers (SIBA) and the Campaign for Real Ale (CAMRA).

The brewery was taken over in late 2008, following Hanby Ales going into receivership, to be renamed as Wem Brewing Company.

They ceased trading in 2010.

== Product Range ==
Their range included:

- Traditional ales: Drawwell Bitter, All Seasons Ale, Cascade Bitter, Rainbow Chaser, Shropshire IPA, Golden Honey.
- Specialty and premium beers: Shropshire Premium Bitter, Taverners Ale, Nutcracker Ale, Cherry Bomb.
- Dark ales: Black Magic Mild, Shropshire Stout, Scorpio Porter.
- Pale ales: Pure Gold.
