= Morland Brewery =

Brewery in Abingdon-on-Thames, Oxfordshire, England

- Location: Westgate Street; Bury St. Edmunds; Suffolk; United Kingdom
- Opened: 1711
- Closed: 2000
- Owned by: Greene King (2000)

Morland was a brewery in Abingdon-on-Thames, Oxfordshire, England, and the second oldest brewer in England, until it was bought by Greene King in 2000. Morland's beers include Hen's Tooth, Old Speckled Hen, Tanner's Jack and Morland's Original.

John Morland founded the brewery in West Ilsley in 1711. In the 1860s, Morland bought Abbey Brewery and Eagle Brewery and in 1885 changed its name to United Breweries. The company bought several more breweries and around 1944 changed its name back to Morland. In 1979, Morland created Old Speckled Hen, one of their most popular beers, to commemorate the 50th anniversary of the MG car factory in Abingdon, England.

After Greene King bought the Morland brewery in Abingdon, it closed it and transferred the Ruddles and Old Speckled Hen brands to its own brewery in Bury St Edmunds. The building was converted into residential housing.

== History ==
A farmer, John Morland, set up the brewery in 1711, and the ale and porter was bought by pubs in London. In the 1860s, Morland acquired Abbey Brewery and then Eagle Brewery. In the 1880s, Morland moved its operation from West Ilsley to Abingdon.

In 1885, Morland became a limited company and changed its name to United Breweries and its trademark to a pyramid of three beer barrels, with the initials of the three breweries on the ends of them. In 1889, the company took over two brewers, H. B. Saxby and Field & Sons, keeping their names on the labels of their beers.

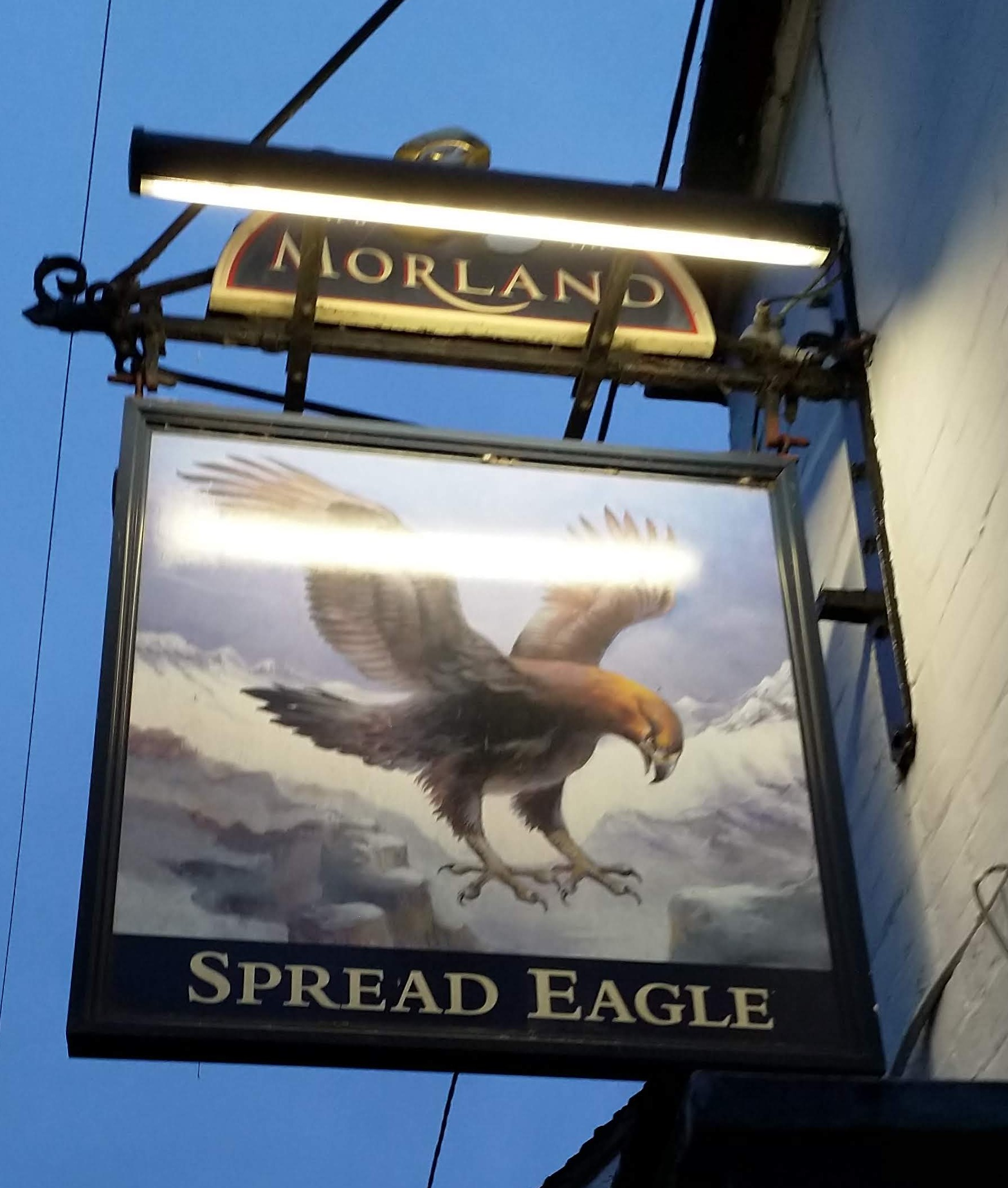
The sign hanging outside the Spread Eagle public house in Abingdon, one of the last remaining showing the Morland name.

Morland acquired Field & Son brewery based at Shillingford near Wallingford. Thomas Skurray, at the age of 19, came with Field & Son. After 10 years at Abingdon Thomas Skurray was running everything apart from the offices. He was chairman of the board until his death in 1938 and was to build a new malthouse and a soft drinks factory.

Thomas Skurray had a son, Thomas Edward Deane Skurray, who was a partner in a company called Theobold & Skurray, a company of Architects. Deane was responsible for the building of many new pubs in the 1930s: The Saxton Arms, Abingdon; the Ox, Oxford Road, Abingdon; the Royal Oak, Didcot; the Old White Hart at Hook; the New Inn at Longworth and the Bystander at Wootton, Abingdon, also looking after over 300 other Morland pubs & hotels.

Morland bought more breweries:

- The Abbey Brewery.
- Saxby's Brewery.
- Field and Sons Brewery.
- Ferguson Brewery.
- The Wantage Brewery.
- Dymore-Brown & Sons. First owned by Thomas Skurray then Morland & Co Ltd.
- Henry Hewett & Co.
- Justin & Brinns Castle Street Brewery.
- The Tower Steam Brewery. This building was used by the Morlands as a vehicle repair centre until the 1990s, when they sold it to a housing developer. It is now Tower Close Abingdon.

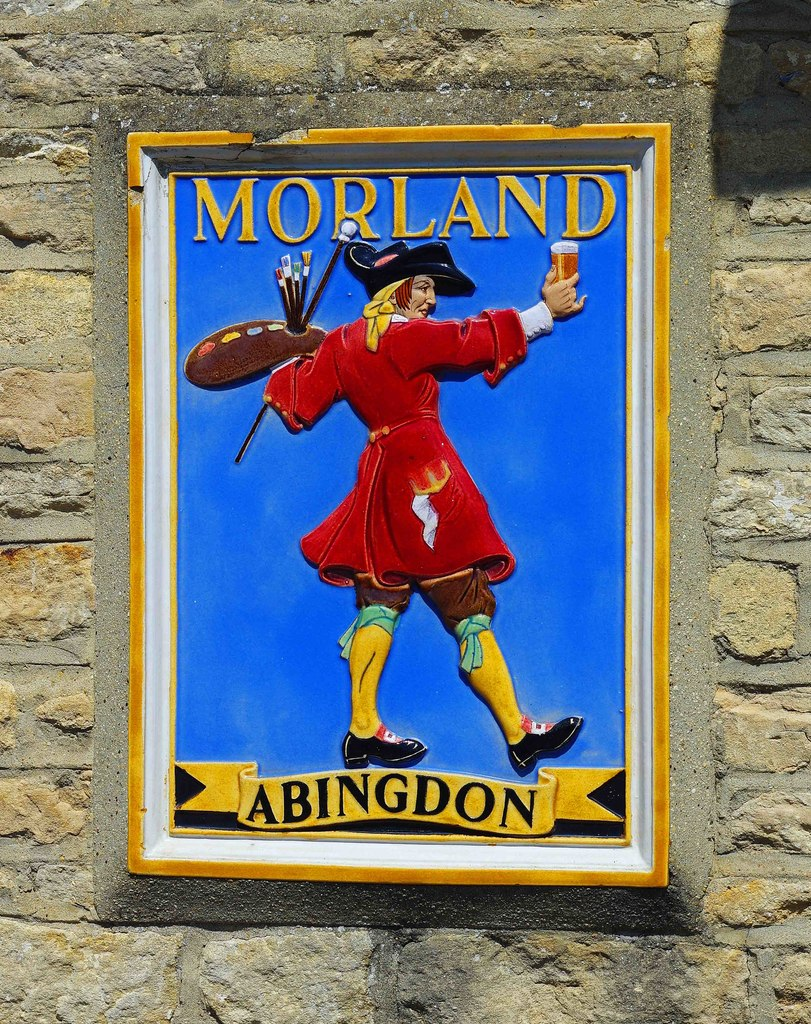
Morland Brewery plaque showing an artist with his palette

In 1944, United-Breweries became a public limited company called Morland and Co plc, and all the acquired brewery names were dropped except Ferguson's Ltd, which was retained for the wine and spirits business, and Bass-Charrington Brewery which was kept separate because of its expensive new distribution warehouse. In 1997 Morland purchased Ruddles Brewery and moved their production from Oakham to Abingdon. In 2000 Morland and Co plc was sold to Greene King brewery. This led to the closure of the Abingdon brewery and the transfer of production to Bury St. Edmunds.

The Morland's sign, showing an artist with his palette, commemorated George Morland who was a noted artist and painter. "Artist's Keg" bitter was also brewed during the 1980s and 1990s. These can still be seen today on many old Morland public houses.

== Morland buildings ==
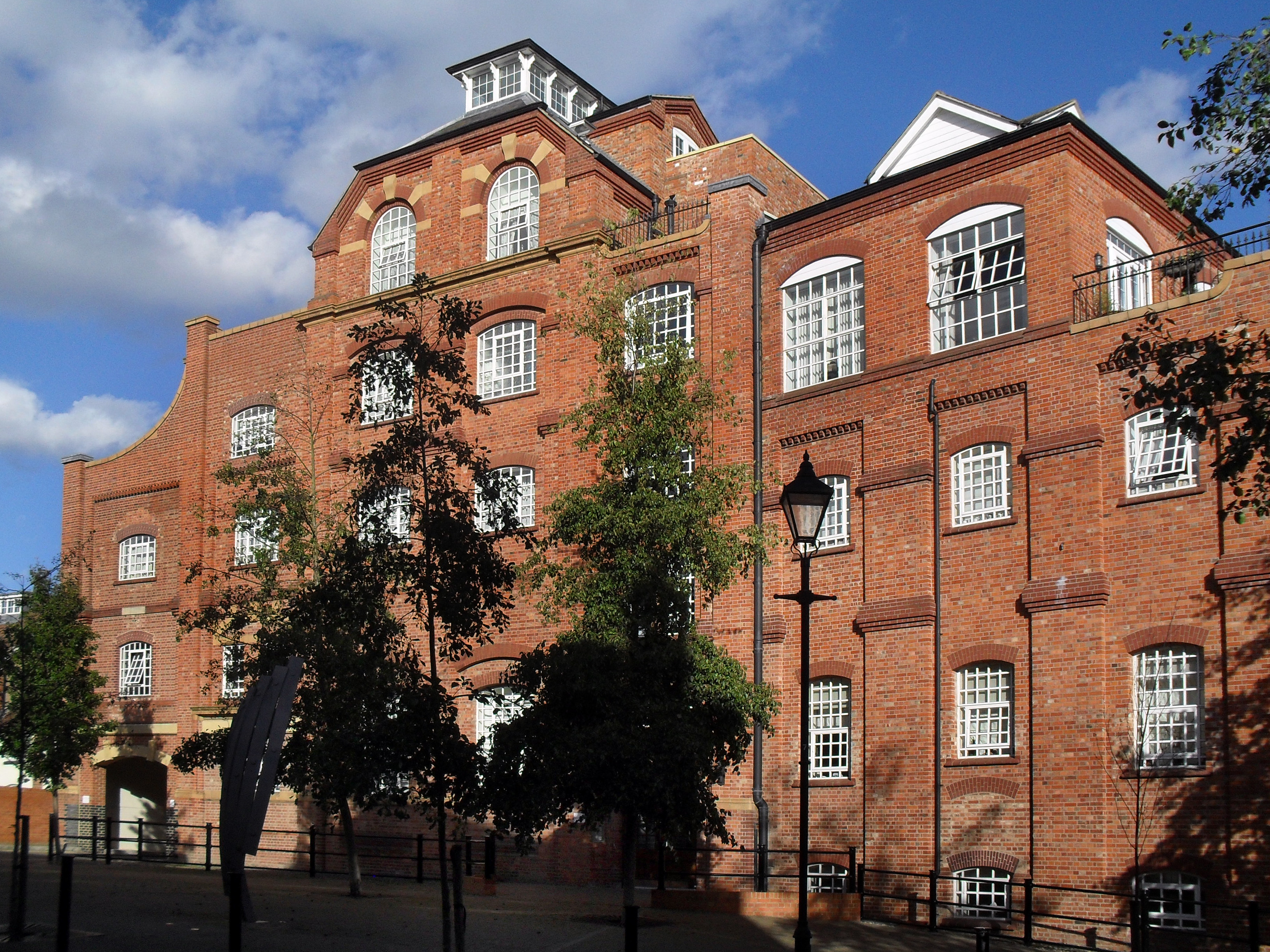
Former Morlands Eagle Brewery in Ock Street Brewery, now known as the Brew Tower apartments

=== Pubs and restaurants ===
In 1991, Morland and Co plc purchased 101 pubs from Courage Ltd and a further 100 were added two years later from Whitbread. More purchases were made in the mid-1990s, and also a number of restaurants nationwide. Morland opened their own restaurants called 'Artist Fayre as well as another 100 pubs from Whitbread & co Plc.'. Morland Plc owned over five hundred pubs when the brewery closed in 2000.

=== Brewery buildings ===
A large wooden house built for head brewer James Dymore Brown great-grandson of Jas Dymore Brown Reading Brewery once lived in was demolished when the company built a large air-conditioned draught beer warehouse. A lot of the brewery buildings are still standing. The big Malthouse which became Morland's offices and stores. Old malthouse cottages where Mr A.J.Steele signwriter painted the Breweries pub signs. And another part of a malthouse is used as the joiner's shop and a paint store. Bell Amusements a subsidiary of Morland owned was based in Northampton, and office in the old malthouse.

== Beer ==
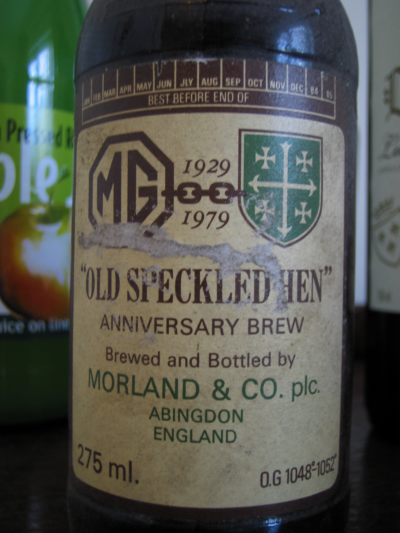
Bottle of Old Speckled Hen (MG Anniversary Brew)

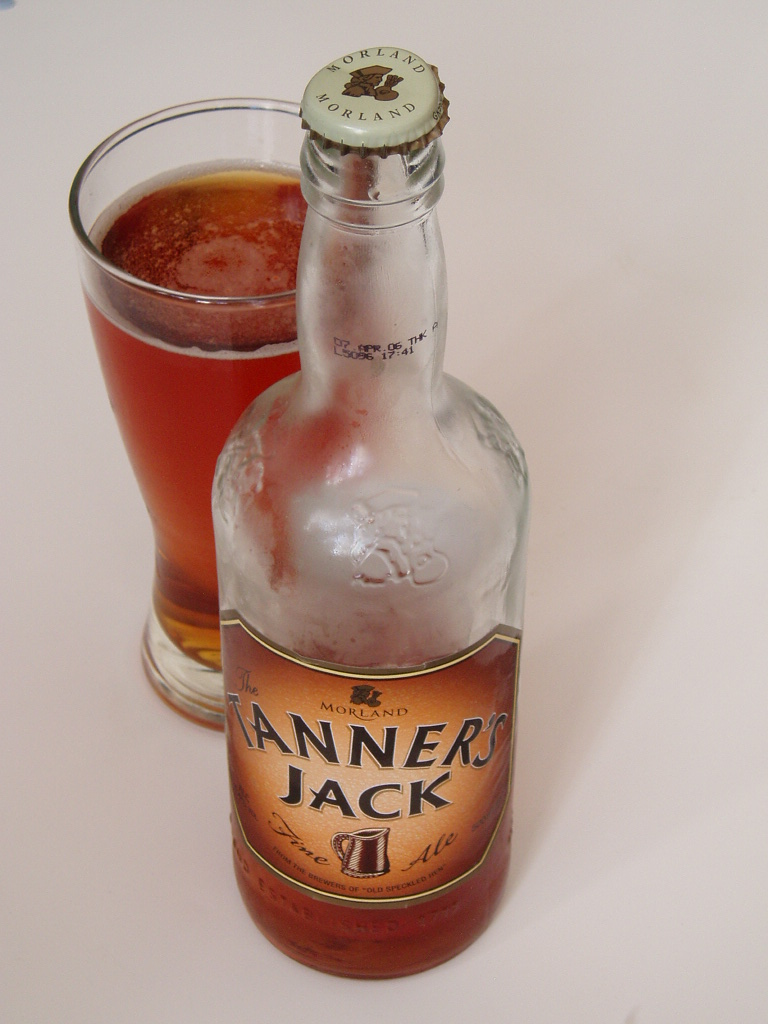
Tanner's Jack ale, named after the leather tankards popular in the 18th century

=== Old Speckled Hen ===
Old Speckled Hen beer was first brewed by Morland in 1979 to commemorate the 50th anniversary of the MG car factory there on 30 November 1979. Other variations launched by Greene King include Old Hoppy Hen, Old Crafty Hen, Old Golden Hen.

=== Other Morland beers ===
- Morland Original
- Hen's Tooth
- Tanner's Jack
- 1711 Bitter
- Fergusons Smooth Stream
- Revival Dark Mild
- Beechnut Ale
- Bill's Spring Brew
- Old Masters Bitter
- Fergusons
- IPA
- Beagle
- Viking
- Monarch
- Excalibur Strong
- Graduate

Morland Original, Hen's Tooth and Tanner's Jack are also still brewed under Greene King of Bury St Edmunds by Morland's Brewing.
