= Kimberley Brewery =

Brewery in Kimberley, Nottinghamshire, England

Coordinates: 53.00004°N 1.26036°W

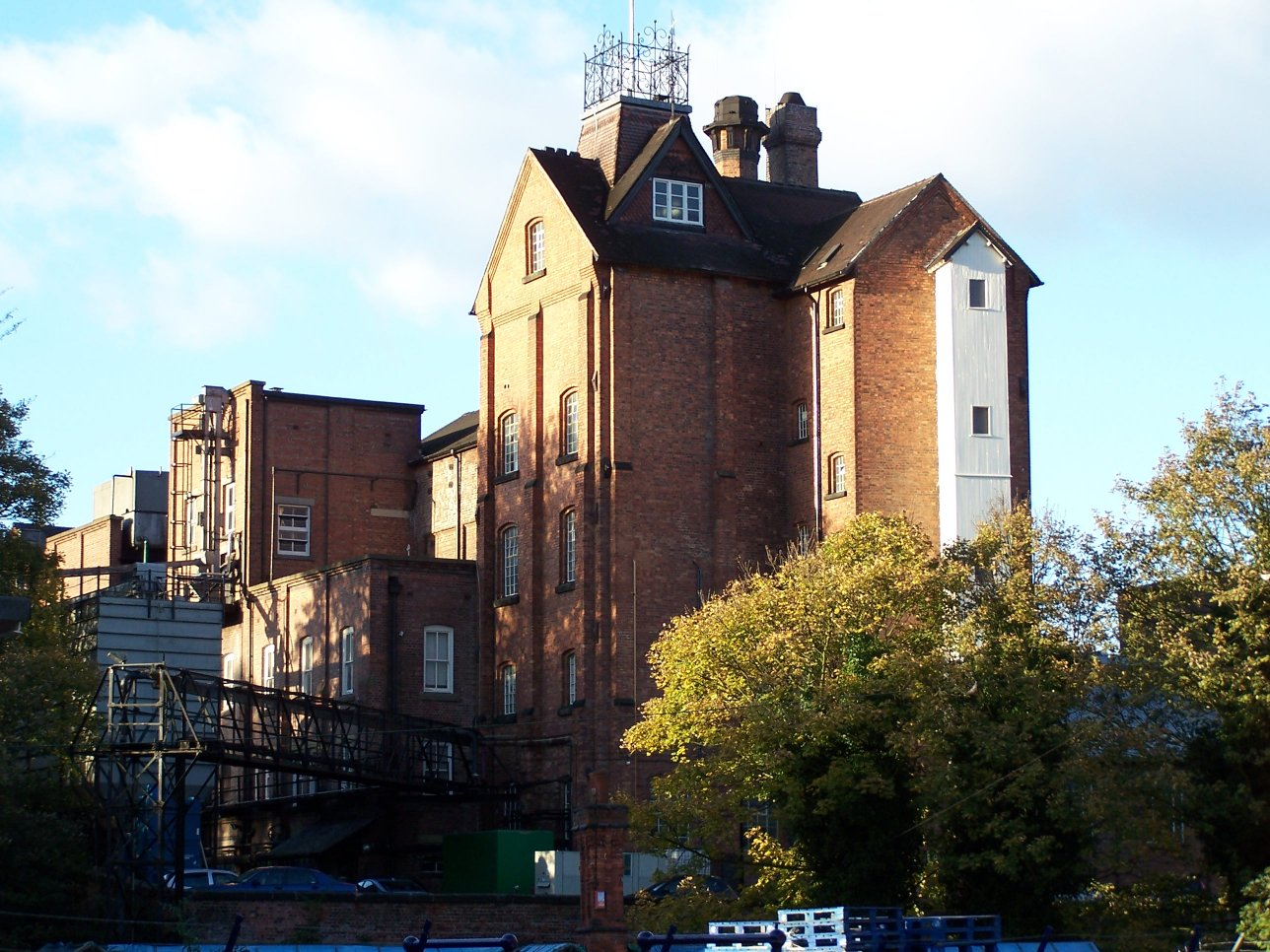
Kimberley Brewery

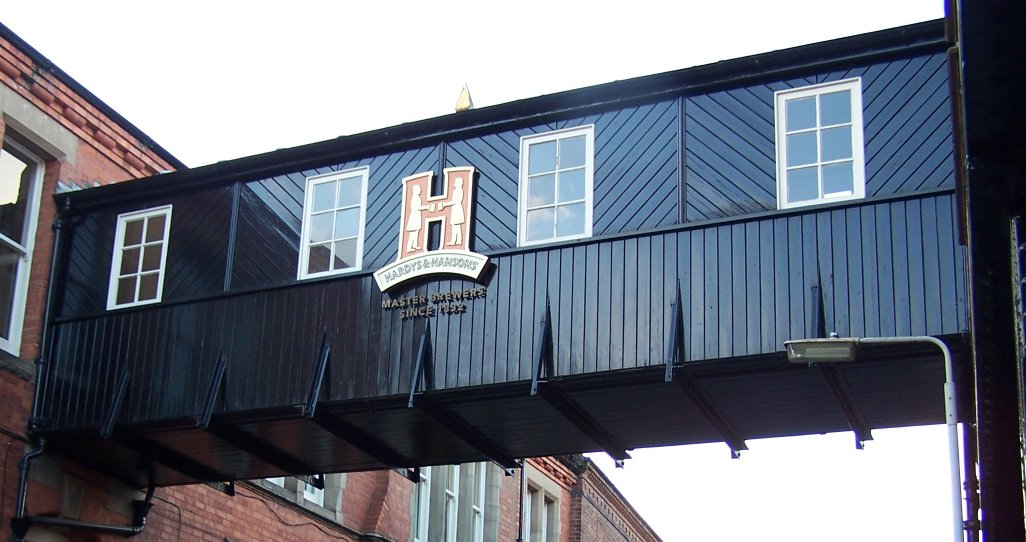
Brewery's Bridge across Hardy Street between two sections of the site

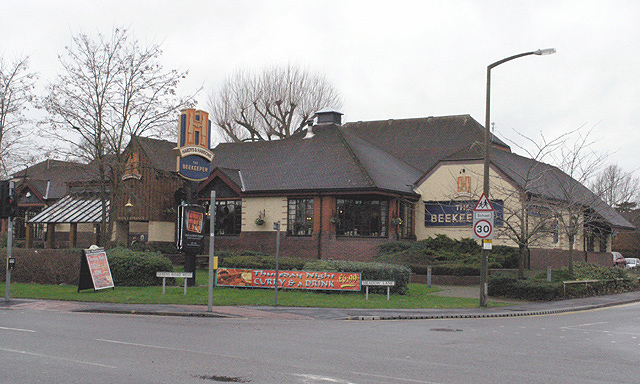
The Beekeeper, a former Hardys & Hansons pub in Chilwell which has since become a Hungry Horse

The Kimberley Brewery, also known as Hardy & Hanson's Brewery or Hardys & Hansons, was the oldest independent brewery in the English county of Nottinghamshire, and has a heritage dating from 1832. It was originally two adjoining but independent breweries, Hardy's Brewery and Hanson's Brewery, which merged in 1930. The brewery ceased brewing in December 2006.

Samuel Robinson opened the first commercial brewery in Kimberley in 1832. It was located in a rented bake-house using water from the Alley Spring in what is now called Hardy Street. Stephen Hanson meanwhile built his brewery on nearby Brewery Street in 1847, also using water from the Alley Spring.

William & Thomas Hardy were successful beer merchants from Heanor who bought Samuel Robinson's brewery in 1857. In 1861 they moved out of the old bake-house and constructed a new brewery that formed the core of the brewery until it closed. Also in 1861, Stephen Hanson died and the business was carried on by his wife Mary and son Robert Hanson.

Both breweries began to buy pubs throughout the area to supply with their own ales. However their increased production meant they started to run short of water. This was resolved by an agreement to share the water from the local Holly Well spring.

Both breweries thrived independently until 1930, when under increasing pressure from larger brewing companies and lack of male successors to the Hardy's Brewery, the two companies combined.

In 2006, The Hardys & Hansons Kimberley Brewery and all of its public houses were sold in a multi-million-pound deal to Greene King brewery with a promise to the locals employed there that they would continue brewing, they backtracked on the promise and at first made it a distribution hub before selling it off to property speculators. The surviving brands are now brewed in Bury St Edmunds.

The site is currently being developed into housing by Fairgrove Homes. The distribution centre (circa 1980s), located to the rear of the courtyard, has been demolished along with a red brick loading bay. The grain tanks to the side of the brewery have also been taken down and all concrete surfaces or roads to the rear of the site have been demolished. The black bridge as seen on the second photo down will remain along with the tower, brew house, malt kilns and storage warehouse.

== Bibliography ==
- Lee, John.M. (2001). A Brief History of Kimberley (First ed.).
- Bruce, George (1982). Kimberley Ale Hardys & Hansons 1832-1982 (First ed.). H Melland. ISBN 0-9500730-9-1.
