= Ridley's Brewery =

English brewery

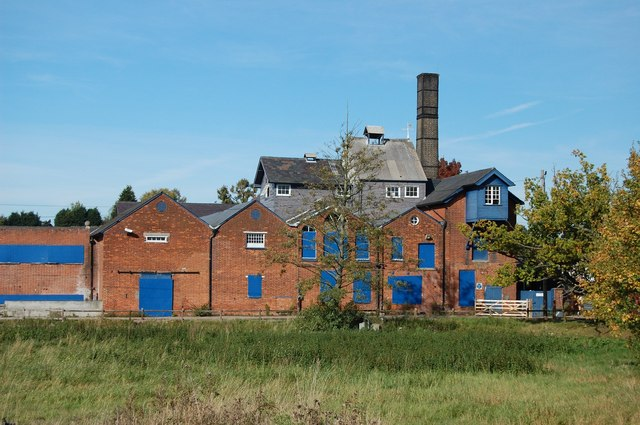
- Industry: Alcoholic beverage
- Founded: 1842
- Founder: Thomas Dixon Ridley
- Defunct: 2005
- Products: Beer
- Owner: Greene King

Ridley's Brewery is a defunct brewery. It was founded in 1842, and was located in Hartford End, Essex. In August 2002 the company bought out the Tolly Cobbold brewery. Then, in 2005 Ridley's was bought by Greene King for £45.6 million closing its operations at Hartford End and Braintree and dropping of rivaling beers to their own brands. Ridley's Old Bob continues to be produced by Greene King at Bury St. Edmunds.

== The independent company ==
Ridley's was officially T. D. Ridley & Sons Ltd. It started as a water mill at Hartford End and from that it developed a flour milling business in Chelmsford, two maltings, also in Chelmsford, and the brewery which stayed at Hartford End. In the early 1970s, Ridley's is recorded as having "just over 60" tied houses, mostly in central and north-west Essex.

== Re-born ==
Nelion Ridley, son of last Ridley chairman Nicholas, started brewing again on a micro scale in 2011 under the company Bishop Nick Ltd named after family member Bishop Nicholas Ridley who was burned at the stake at Oxford in 1555 during the reign of Mary I for championing the Protestant cause. He was considered one of the finest academic minds of the English reformation and made an Anglican martyr The brewery operates in Braintree.
