= Pub sign =

Traditional signboard placed outside a pub

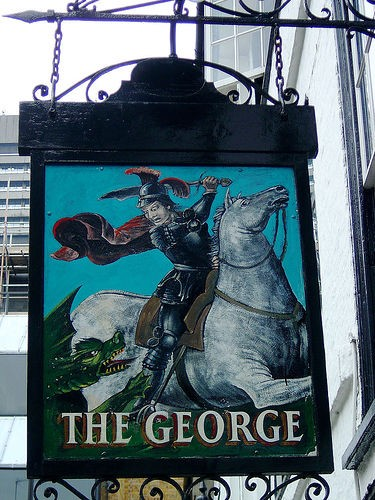
The pub sign of the George, Southwark in south London, depicting St George slaying a dragon

Pub sign is a traditional signboard or pictorial panel hanging outside a public house ("pub") in the United Kingdom and other countries with British cultural influence. These signs are part of a centuries-old tradition of visual symbols used to identify and advertise public drinking establishments.

== History ==
The tradition of pub signs dates back to the Roman era, but it was codified in England by King Richard II in 1393, who ordered that ale houses must hang a sign outside to allow inspectors to identify them.

Pub signs are often notable for their colorful and imaginative artwork, depicting everything from heraldic emblems and royalty to animals, tools, and puns. They have become an integral part of British cultural heritage and folk art.

The use of signs to advertise drinking establishments predates the Middle Ages. During the Roman occupation of Britain, inns known as "tabernae" displayed bunches of vine leaves to indicate the availability of wine. When wine was not widely available in medieval England, other signs emerged—such as a hoop of iron or a painted board.

In England, signs became widespread following a 1393 decree by King Richard II, requiring publicans to display a sign identifying their premises, both for regulation and taxation purposes.

During the Middle Ages, the majority of the population was illiterate, so visual imagery became essential for business identification. Animals, heraldic symbols, religious icons, and trades were common themes. As time progressed, the imagery became more varied and sometimes whimsical.

== Design and symbolism ==
Pub signs often depict:

- Royal symbols, e.g., The Crown, The King's Head
- Heraldic imagery, e.g., The Red Lion (a common sign derived from the Scottish royal coat of arms)
- Historical or religious figures, e.g., St. George and the Dragon
- Local references, events, or landmarks

Some signs are double-sided and hand-painted, while others may use sculptural elements or gilded reliefs. Today, many traditional signs are preserved as heritage items.

== Cultural significance ==
Pub signs are considered an important part of British folk art and social history. They reflect local culture, humor, politics, and values, and are often seen as markers of continuity in communities. Preservation of historic pub signs is supported by local councils and heritage groups. Some old signs are displayed in museums, such as the Museum of London or in private collections.

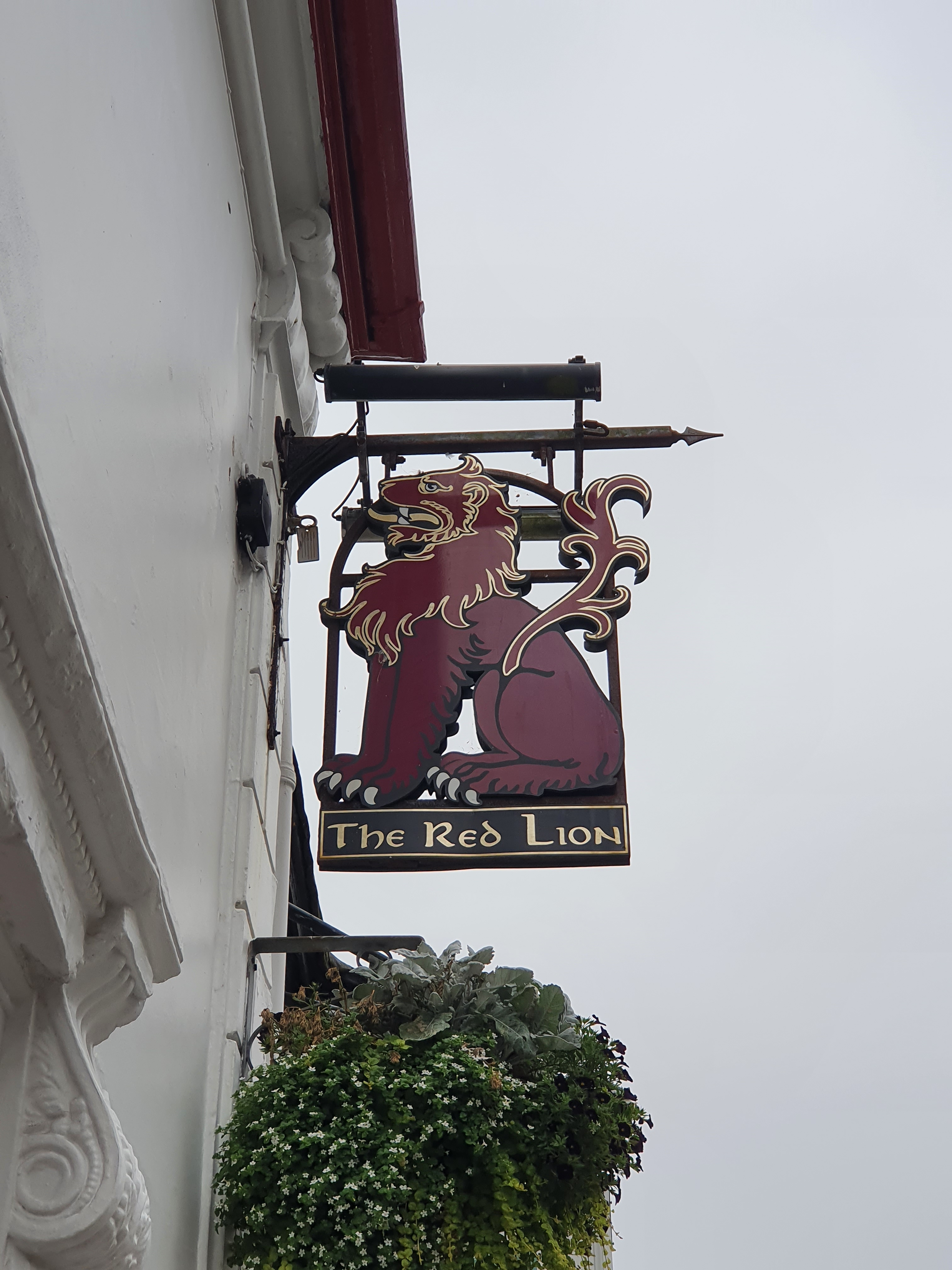
Pub sign of the Red Lion, Church Street, Helston

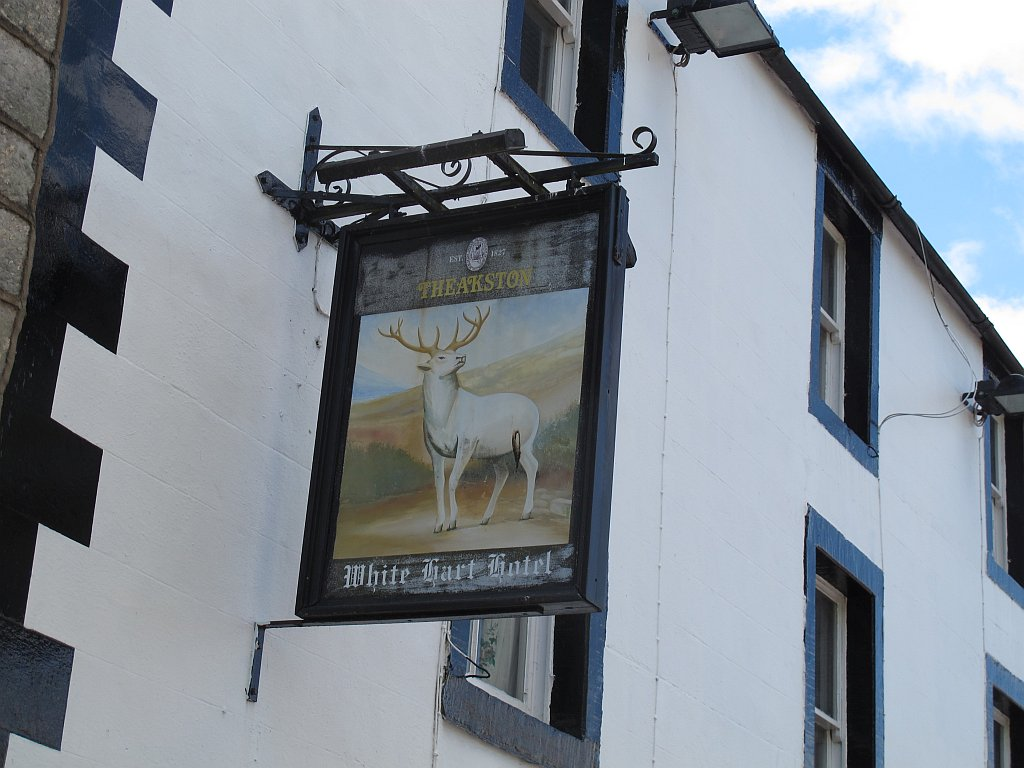
Sign of the White Hart, Boroughgate, Appleby

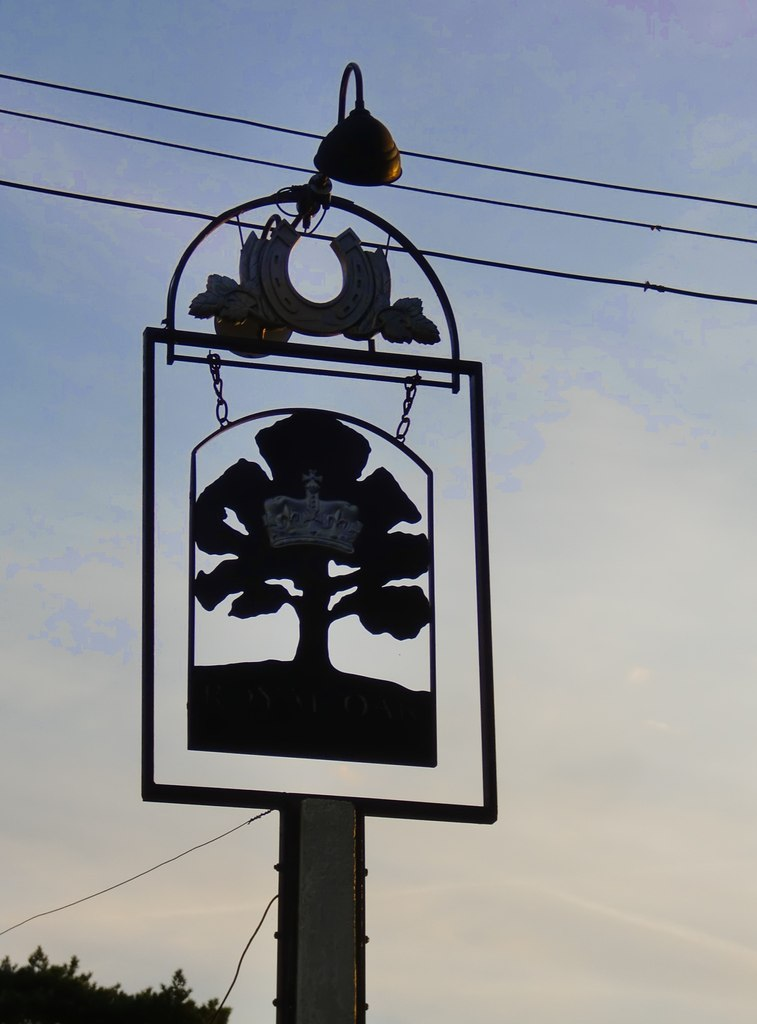
The Royal Oak, Caterfield Lane, Staffhurst Wood

== See also ==
- Inn sign
