= Broughton Shopping Park =

Retail park in Flintshire, Wales

- Parc Siopa Brychdyn

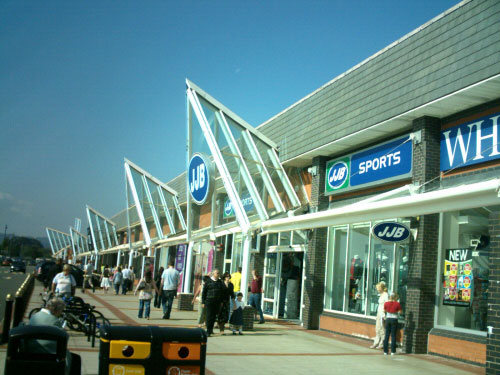
- Broughton Shopping Park in 2008, pre-refurbishment
- Location: Broughton, Flintshire, Wales CH4 0DP
- Coordinates: 53.1683°N 2.9729°W
- Address: Chester Road, Bretton CH4 0DP (Note: as listed on official website)
- Opened: June 1999
- Developer: Development Securities PLC
- Owner: The Hercules Unit Trust (British Land)
- Num. of stores: 37 - retail and leisure units
- Floor area: 298,000 sq ft (27,700 m^{2})
- Floors: 1
- Parking: 2,160 parking spaces
- Public transit: Road and Bus connections Other: A55, Hawarden Station, Hawarden Airport
- Website: broughtonshoppingpark.com

Broughton Shopping Park (Welsh: Parc Siopa Brychdyn), also known as Broughton Centre (Welsh: Canolfan Brychdyn), (Note: It is referred to as Broughton Centre by British Land. Alternatively known as Broughton Retail Park or simply Broughton Park by local government and the local populace) is a retail park in Broughton, Flintshire, Wales. (Note: Various sources list the shopping park to be either in Bretton or Broughton. The park's official website lists it to be in Bretton. Some venues at the park style themselves to be in Chester, despite being in Wales. British Land uses the term "Broughton, Chester".) It is the busiest retail park in North Wales, recording an average annual footfall of 10 million. Branches of many popular high street stores have an outlet in the park. Retail outlets include Asda Living, Primark and SportsDirect. The retail park is located opposite the Airbus factory on Chester Road (A5104), 4 miles west of Chester city centre, and 400 metres from the England–Wales border.

In addition to shopping venues, the retail park is host to numerous outlets for food and drink with the Mill House Pub also on the site. A Cineworld multi-screen IMAX cinema opened in 2015, alongside restaurants including Frankie and Benny's, Nandos, and Prezzo.

== History ==
The shopping park was built on land between Bretton Road, Chester Road, and Bretton Lane. The eastern end was originally farmland and the western end (between Bretton Road and Chester Road) was Mold Railway between 1849 and 1983. The Mill House pub and McDonald's are sited on the former railway route.

=== Opening ===
The Broughton Park shopping centre opened in June 1999 with 300,000 square feet of shops. It opened to provide an alternative for the local population in north-east Wales, which had previously looked almost entirely to Chester for its main shopping facilities, such as those present in Chester city centre, and Cheshire Oaks (opened in March 1995).

The arrival of a new shopping area was a welcomed addition for the local community, and it was officially opened by Emmerdale star Malandra Burrows, it employed just under 1,000 people and was only home to 16 retailers, including Soccer Sports (now Sports Direct), Tesco, WH Smith (now known as TGJones), Clarks and Next, all of which are still present in the park as of January 2022.

=== British Land management ===
In 2007, British Land began managing the Centre and works to improve the park started in 2014.

A leisure development of the park was completed in 2015, including the opening of the first IMAX cinema (with 11 screens) in North Wales and five restaurants, including: Chiquito, and Prezzo opening in 2014, and Pizza Express, and Nando's in 2015.

In 2016, one of the region’s biggest and Primark's 300th store opened, alongside M&S Foodhall, and Outfit. In the same year, major refurbishment works were launched, the works included refurbishing the park's; public areas, car parks and shop fronts (with new canopies and double height glazing).

In 2017, The Body Shop, JD Sports, EE, the former Toys R Us, and Foot Asylum's first North Wales store opened. The improvements works concluded in 2017.

The park today has grown to host 38 retailers, across over 365,000 sq ft, it employs more than 2,000 people and attracts 10.5m visitors a year. In June 2018, a report published by British Land, conducted by Regeneris, reported that Broughton Centre, contributed £53m to Flintshire's economy in Gross value added (GVA) over a one-year period.

In June 2019, to mark its 20th anniversary, the park announced that it would support 20 good deeds throughout the local area to celebrate its milestone anniversary, with the park calling on residents to nominate local good deeds to make the list.

Alan Barker, centre manager at Broughton Shopping, said: "Community is hugely important to us, so it's brilliant to mark the milestone by supporting a worthy cause for each year we've been around. Although many retailers have been here since we opened, the centre is still unrecognisable from the one which launched back in 1999. In the past few years especially, we've gone from strength to strength to become one of the region's leading leisure destinations."

In March 2020, plans to bring a 24-hour gym to Broughton Shopping Park were approved. Pure Gym, the UK’s largest gym chain, submitted proposals for a new 1,069 m^{2} facility to Flintshire Council in January 2020, the company’s application was approved in March and will see the premises vacated by Nike after its store closed in June 2019, to be newly occupied by Pure Gym. The gym would be the second Pure Gym in North Wales, after Wrexham's Central retail park.

During the COVID-19 pandemic, the park (excluding supermarkets) were shut in late March 2020, and following Welsh Government guidelines, re-opened in stages, in June, July and August 2020.

In November 2021, Sam Rowlands, an MS for North Wales, called for the Welsh Government to make improvements to the slip road junction 36a of the A55, which only connects the shopping park with traffic from the east from Chester and Wrexham. Rowlands stated improvements to the route from the west, which goes through the village of Broughton, should be made. The government stated it would not make changes to the junction and would instead focus on alternative ways to travel to the shopping park to address climate change.

=== Cross-border concerns ===
During the COVID-19 pandemic, a national lockdown order was issued across the United Kingdom in March 2020, closing the entire centre aside from essential shops such as Tesco. As the centre resides in Wales, the timing and eventual order for a staged reopening of shops and restaurants were the responsibility of the Welsh Government. Orders to reopen in England were given earlier than in Wales, so the park remained closed. However, the reverse occurred in November 2020, whereas following a short 2-week "firebreak" lockdown starting in October 2020, Wales started re-opening again on 9 November, merely a few days after England began its second national lockdown.

Concerns were raised over policing in the park and whether the responsibility would be increasingly pressured onto retail workers, and the centre's location on the border, made it a large concern for the Welsh Government, with North Wales Police and Crime Commissioner Arfon Jones, fearing English shoppers from North West England would increase transmission of COVID-19 in the local area and Flintshire as a whole, with him saying "It’s going to have implications for policing in North Wales because I think people will be tempted to cross the border to pop into Wrexham for a drink or go to retail centres like Broughton Shopping Park". The November 2020 situation re-occurred in March 2021, when the Welsh Government announced some non-essential businesses can reopen from 15 March 2021, earlier than England's scheduled date on 12 April, with a message of "stay local" being raised to address cross-border concerns.

== Stores ==
The park is home to the following stores, as of January 2026.

=== Shopping ===
- Asda Living
- Boots
  - Boots Pharmacy
- Card Factory
- Clogau
- H&M
- Holland & Barrett
- HomeSense
- Lush
- M&S Foodhall
- MANGO
- Mountain Warehouse
- Nail Box
- New Look
- Next
- Primark
- River Island
- Specsavers
- Superdrug
- Tesco Extra
- The Entertainer
- The Fragrance Shop
- TGJones
- White Stuff

=== Food and drink ===
- Black Sheep Coffee
- Chiquito
- Costa Coffee
- Donut Theatre
- Frankie & Benny's
- McDonald's
- Mill House Inn
- Nando's
- Pedro's Kitchen
- PizzaExpress
- Prezzo
- Starbucks (located in the Cineworld unit)
- Slim Chickens (Under construction in the old Tim Hortons unit)

=== Footwear and sport ===
- Footasylum
- JD Sports
- Sports Direct
- Schuh

=== Services ===
- BT & EE
- Groom Lounge Barbershop
- Hays Travel
- Regus Express
- TUI Holiday Store

=== Entertainment ===
- Cineworld
  - IMAX
  - 4DX

=== Shop info ===
- Cafés
  - Asda Living, M&S Foodhall, Tesco Extra, Costa, Black Sheep Coffee and Cineworld all contain cafe outlets (Cineworld being Starbucks)
- Toilets
  - McDonald's, Mill House Inn, Tesco Extra, Asda Living, Cineworld and Costa customer facilities all contain toilets
- Currency Exchange
  - A bureau is available in Tesco Extra
- ATM
  - ATMs are available at Tesco and Boots (both outdoors)

Tim Hortons opened their first drive-through store in Wales at the centre before closing in late 2025, taking over the previously occupied Carphone Warehouse unit.

Lush opened their first store in North Wales at the park in July 2023. The store is located in the previous Monsoon between Black Sheep Coffee and River Island.

== Impact ==
A report released by the owners British Land, conducted by independent economics consultancy, Regeneris, in June 2018, detailed the impact Broughton Centre has had on the local Broughton-Bretton community and the wider Flintshire-Cheshire area, the report's findings are:

=== Infrastructure ===
From 2014 to 2017, British Land invested over £24 million into improvements and new developments of the centre.

=== Economic ===
Broughton Centre provides 1,900 jobs, in which 1 in 4 are in the retail sector, and 1 in every 40 jobs in Flintshire is supported by Broughton Centre. At the centre's annual jobs fair in 2017, 1000+ attendees were present, in which 60% gained employment at the site.

£53 million in GVA, was contributed to the Flintshire economy each year, with the contribution to all of Wales being £84 million. £6.7 million is collected annually in business rates by Flintshire County Council from the park, 10% of all business rate collection in Flintshire.

66% of goods and services provided to Broughton Centre is provided by local businesses, £462,000 of the centre's expenditure goes to local businesses within a 25-mile radius, in 2017.

=== Community ===
It was reported that 994+ school pupils benefited from the centre's Young Readers programme with the National Literacy Trust since 2013, £91,000+ has been invested into the Broughton community since 2015 and £30,000+ has been raised through fundraising initiatives for charitable causes, from customers at the centre.

=== Customer ===
The report estimated that 10.5 million people visit the centre, annually, with an average of 200,000 visitors per week. Of these customers, 96% would recommend the site to a friend, with staff, safety, security, and cleanliness scoring over 4.7/5.

==== Support ====
The staff at the centre are reported to have undergone dementia-friendly training, to ensure a "safe and welcoming environment for all visitors, especially those who may be vulnerable".

=== Environment ===
99% of construction waste during the centre's refurbishment and construction of Cineworld, was diverted from a landfill, with over 40,000 tonnes being re-used and recycled since 2013. 99% of managed waste from the centre is reported to have also been diverted from a landfill. Since 2015, almost 400 tonnes of managed waste has been re-used and recycled from the centre's tenants.

Since 2009, the centre saved 21% of their energy usage, reducing the centre's carbon emissions by over 300 tonnes, and saving retailers £42,000 on energy.
