= Taylor St Baristas =

British coffee shop chain

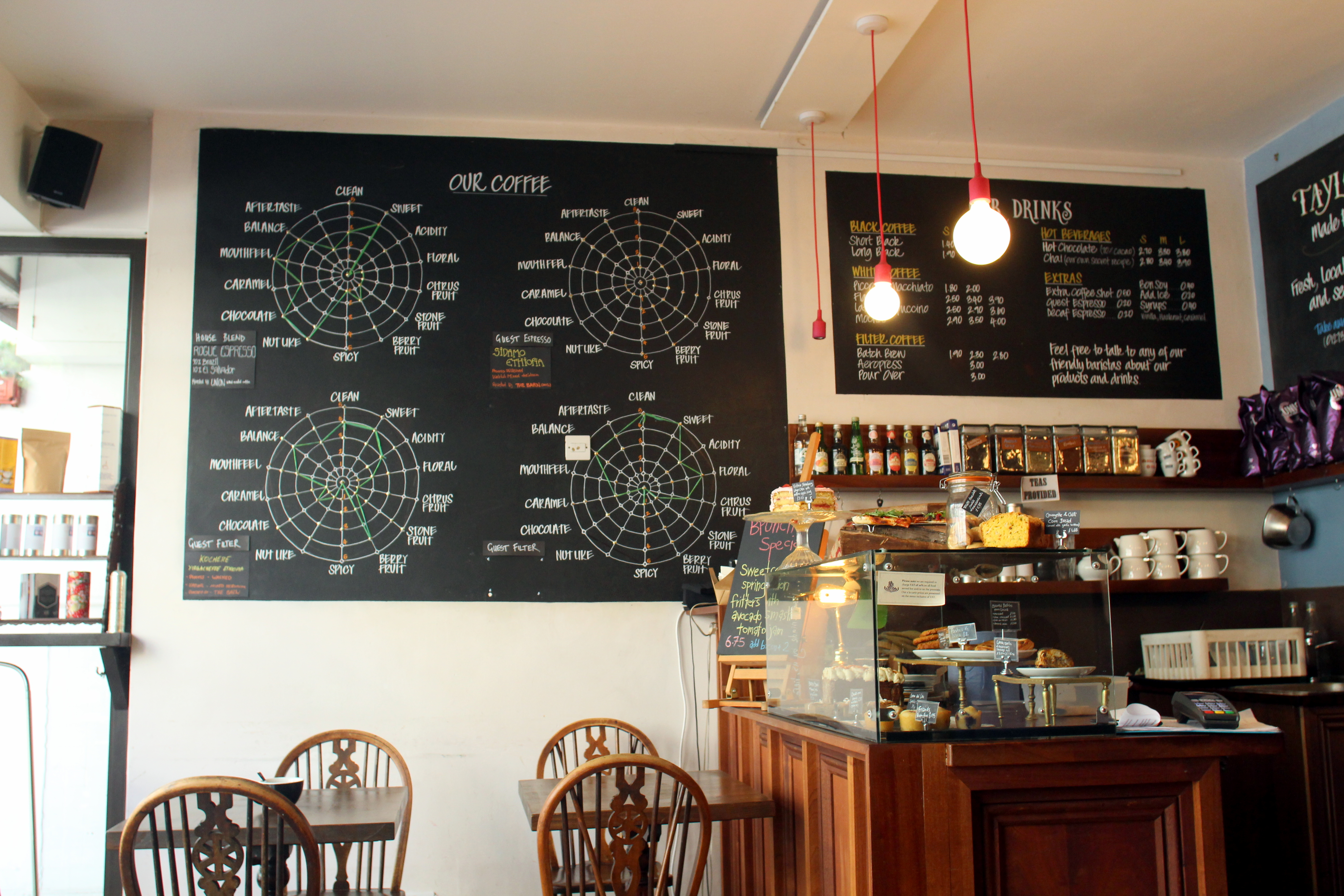
Taylor St Baristas in Brighton

Taylor St Baristas was a British coffee shop chain, with 10 branches, nine in central London, and one in New York City.

It was established by Nick, Andrew and Laura Tolley in February 2006. Their first location was Richmond, in West London. They then opened in Brighton, on the South Coast in September of 2006. Originally the coffee bars were established as concessions in other businesses. Namely Source Foods in Richmond and Travel Bag, on Queens road in Brighton. However later cafes starting with New St, EC2M4TP in London near Liverpool became fully owned and operated Taylor St Baristas sites.

The company is recognised for its barista training program. This allowed it to scale its locations and achieve high standards across its locations. In February 2012, Taylor St Baristas and Tesco Pty ltd formed a joint venture called Harris + Hoole. Over 3 years the Harris + Hoole estate grew to over 50 cafes in high st locations, tesco supermarket concessions and one airport - Stansted.

In 2015, due to controversy with the then CEO of Tesco, Phil Clarke, Tesco's newly appointed CEO changed strategy and sought to divest non-core assets from the Tesco group. The joint venture with Taylor St Baristas was dissolved and Harris+Hoole was sold to the Nero Group who still operate it.

In 2012, Richard Shaer joined the Taylor St leadership team to support Taylor St while the Tolley's worked across Taylor St and Harris +Hoole. Nick Tolley, was CEO of Harris+Hoole. Andrew Tolley was Director of coffee in both businesses and Laura Tolley lead brand and property at Taylor St and consulted for Harris+Hoole. Upon exiting the JV with Tesco, the team were able to focus on growing the Taylor St business. They opened in New York on East 40th and Madison in November 2015 and established their own roasting facility in 2015. The roasting business enabled the development of ecommerce, subscriptions and wholesale coffee channels.

In late 2018, Taylor St announced a global partnership with Sodexo with sites planned for North America, Europe and the UK. The partnership included an exclusive licence to operate Taylor St cafes and a new specialty coffee brand called Chapter & Verse, that was co-developed by Sodexo and Taylor St. Chapter & Verse sites were opened at Chevron in Calgary, Supplying Work Cfe at Santander Banklocations in Leeds, Northern England and Publicismedia locations. With coffee, other drink ingredients and barista training provided by Taylor St.

The pivot to becoming a coffee business focused on wholesale and licencing, rather than a cafe business that operated its own cafes, lead Taylor St to sell the licence to operate its cafes to Conilon Ltd, trading as Black Sheep Coffee.

== Administration ==
Taylor St Baristas sold its café estate to Black Sheep Coffee under an asset purchase agreement entered into in March 2019, with part of the price payable in deferred instalments. Deferred consideration instalments falling due in 2019 and 2020 were not paid by Black Sheep Coffee. The company moved into creditors’ voluntary liquidation on 13 July 2020, with Asher Miller and Henry Lan of David Rubin & Partners were appointed as joint administrators on 19 July 2019.

The brand, roastery and customer base were acquired by Department of Coffee and Social Affairs.

The liquidators, working with debt-recovery firm Pythagoras Capital, brought legal proceedings to recover the debt, which they put at £1.4 million plus interest, and a trial was listed for July 2026. In early July 2026, shortly before the trial, Black Sheep offered £450,000 in full and final settlement, which the liquidators accepted as the best available outcome for creditors due in part to further legal expenses.

In September 2026 the liquidators reported that their statutory investigations had concluded.
