= Coffee 1 =

British coffee house chain

Coffee #1 Ltd
- Type: Subsidiary
- Industry: Hospitality
- Founded: 2000
- Founders: James Shapland, David Jones and Maryanne Tagney
- Headquarters: Bristol, England
- Number of locations: 100 (2019)
- Area served: United Kingdom
- Key people: James Shapland, Bruce Newman, Director
- Products: Hot drinks and baked goods
- Parent: Caffè Nero
- Website: www.coffee1.co.uk

Coffee #1 (Note: Stylized as Coffee#1 and Coffee^{#}1) is a British coffee house chain that originated in Cardiff, Wales in 2001, and is now owned by Caffè Nero. Coffee #1 has outlets along the M4 corridor, with others in Wales and southern England.

== History ==
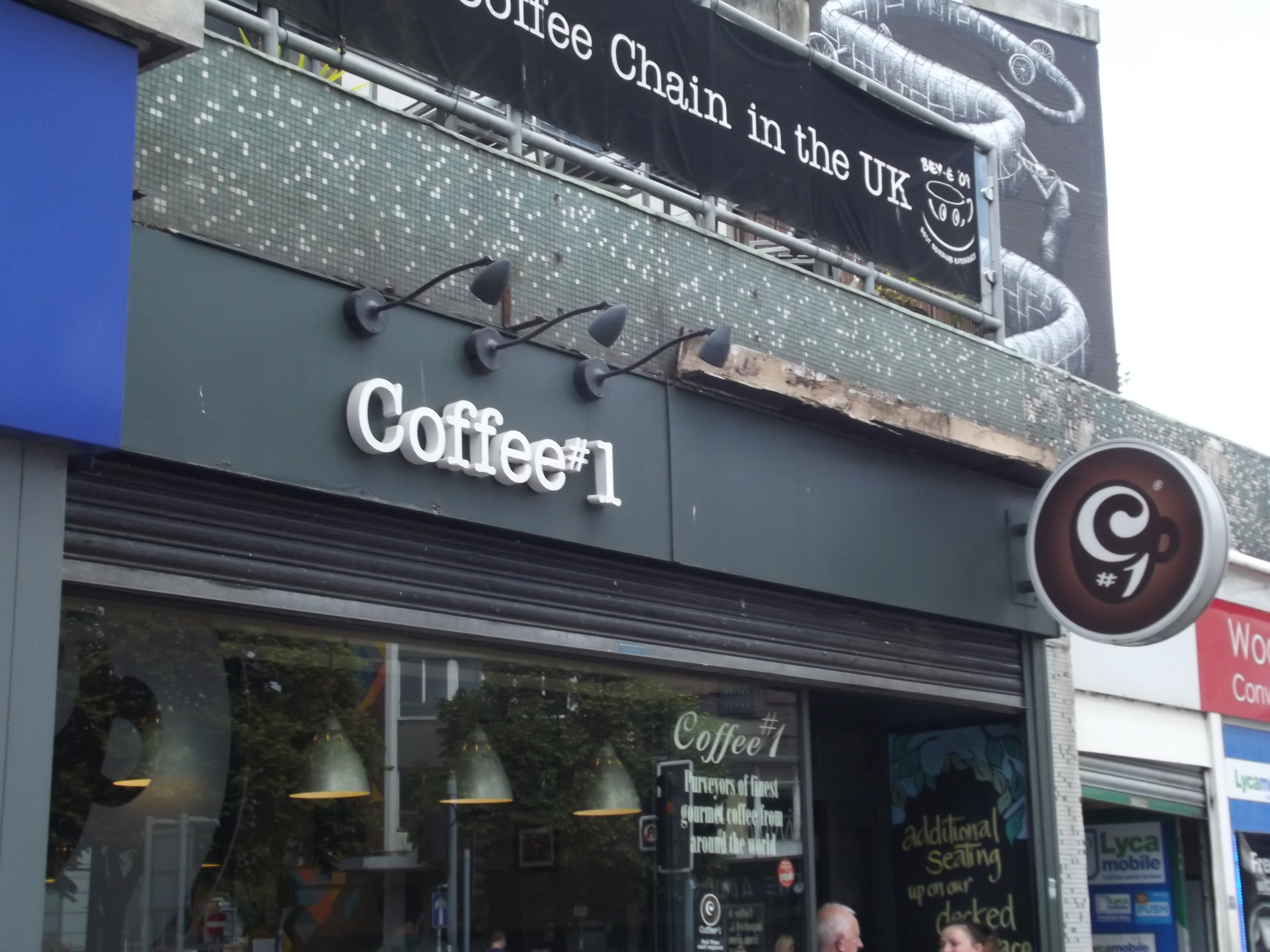
The first Coffee #1, in Wood Street, Cardiff, Wales

Coffee #1 was co-founded in 2000 by David Jones, Maryanne Tagney, James Shapland and Anthony Shapland. James Shapland was appointed managing director in 2002 and was majority shareholder when the business was sold in 2011. Jones and Tagney Jones, both based in Washington State, USA, remained minority shareholders and non-executive directors until the sale in 2011.

Coffee #1 opened its first coffee shop in 2001 on Wood Street, Cardiff, and had three shops by the end of that year. Shapland grew the company to become a market leader across South Wales and South West England. The company won the Cafe Society's Coffee Bar Chain of the Year award in 2009, 2010, 2011, 2012 and 2013 and the Beverage Service Association's 'Best UK Coffee Chain' in 2009.

In the autumn of 2011, Coffee #1 was bought by the Cardiff brewery company SA Brain, who wished to diversify from their pub business. The move was seen as a symptom of the tough trading conditions in the beer market. Brains had previously had Costa Coffee outlets in several of its pubs.

In 2013 another nine outlets were added and in 2014 sales grew by 55%. In April 2015 the company opened their 50th outlet, in Fareham, Hampshire, giving them a total workforce of 380. At the end of 2015 the chain had 57 coffee shops across Wales and parts of southern and central England. The company planned to open another 15 in 2016.

In mid-2018, SA Brain announced that they wished to sell a majority stake in Coffee #1, after a strategic review. Caffè Nero bought a 70% stake in the business, which at that time had 92 outlets, in January 2019, and took full ownership in February 2022. Caffè Nero operates Coffee #1 as a standalone brand.
