= Brains Brewery =

Brewery in Cardiff, Wales

SA Brain & Company Ltd.
- Industry: Brewing
- Founded: 1882
- Founder: Samuel Arthur Brain
- Headquarters: Cardiff, Wales
- Area served: United Kingdom
- Products: Beer
- Number of employees: 34
- Website: www.sabrain.com

Brains (S. A. Brain & Company Ltd.) is a regional brewery based in Cardiff, Wales. It was founded in 1882 by Samuel Arthur Brain. At its peak, the company controlled more than 250 pubs in South Wales (particularly in Cardiff), Mid Wales and the West Country but the brewer sold most of its pub estate in 2022. The company took over Crown Buckley Brewery in Llanelli in 1997 and Hancock's Brewery in 1999. In 2000, Brains moved to the former Hancock's Brewery just south of Cardiff Central railway station. The Old Brewery, in Cardiff city centre, has been developed into a modern bar and restaurant complex.

The company produces a range of beers under the Brains, Buckley's and Hancock's names. As part of their marketing strategy, Brains use shirt sponsorship for the Wales national rugby union team and the Crusaders Rugby League team.

== History ==
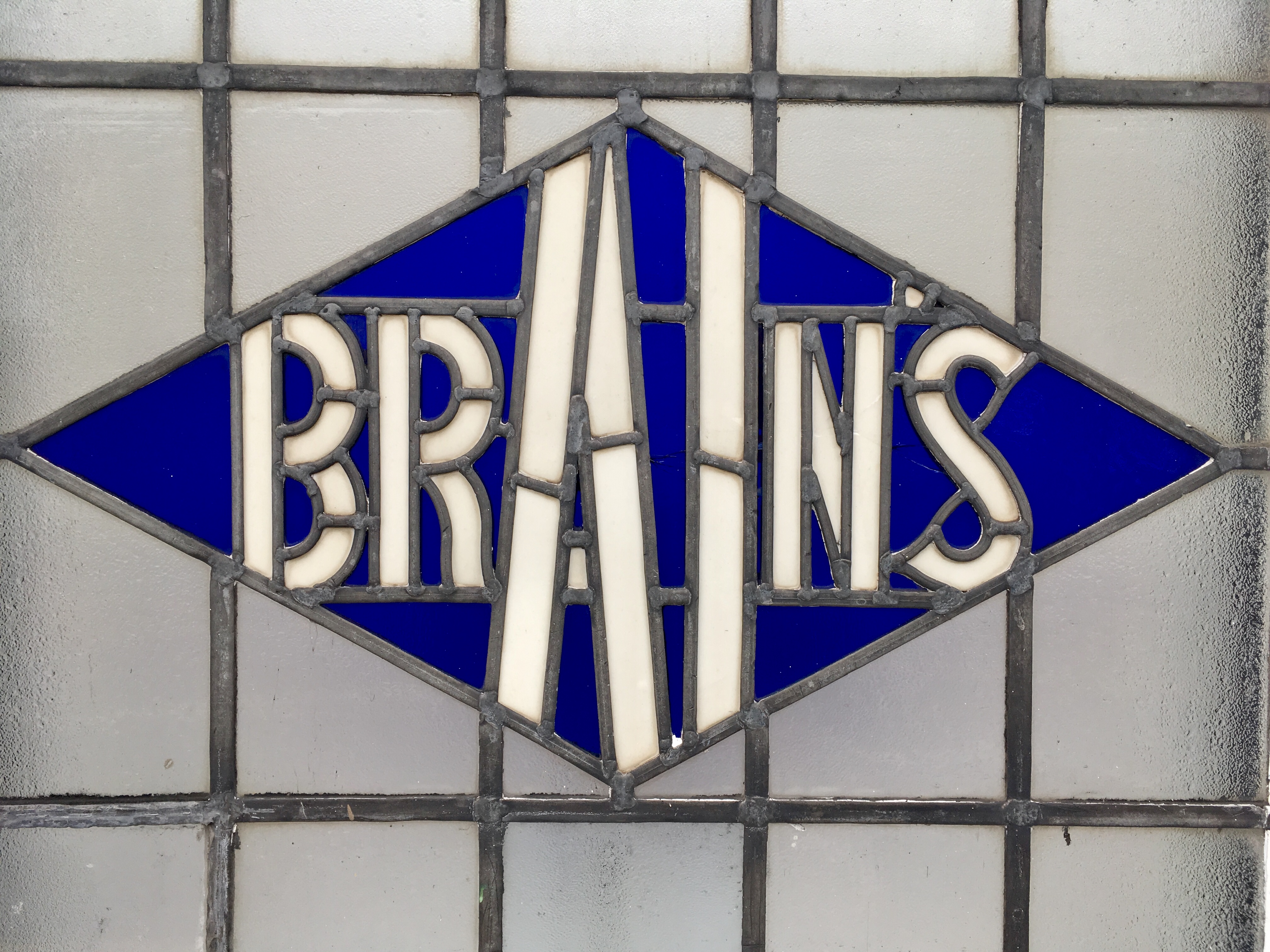
The Brain's logo, complete with apostrophe, in stained-glass

The original brewery, believed to be the oldest in Cardiff, was established by the Thomas brothers in the 18th-century. In 1882 it was acquired by Samuel Arthur Brain, a brewer from Bristol, England, and his uncle Joseph Benjamin Brain, Chairman of the West of England Bank. Part of the building dated from 1713 and it had been a brewery since at least 1822.

In 1882, the brewery produced 100 barrels of beer a week and operated 11 pubs. By 1900 this had grown to 1,000 barrels of beer a week, supplying 80 of their public houses. The company became a limited company, S.A. Brain & Co Ltd, in April 1897 and purchased the business for £350,000.

Brain's expanded the Old Brewery in 1914 by having a new brewery built in St Mary Street.

In 1997, Brain's took over Crown Buckley in Llanelli. It closed Crown Buckley's brewery and transferred production to Cardiff. In 1999, Brain's bought the former Hancock's Brewery just south of Cardiff Central railway station. In 2000, it moved production there, and in 2003 the Old Brewery was redeveloped as a bar and restaurant complex.

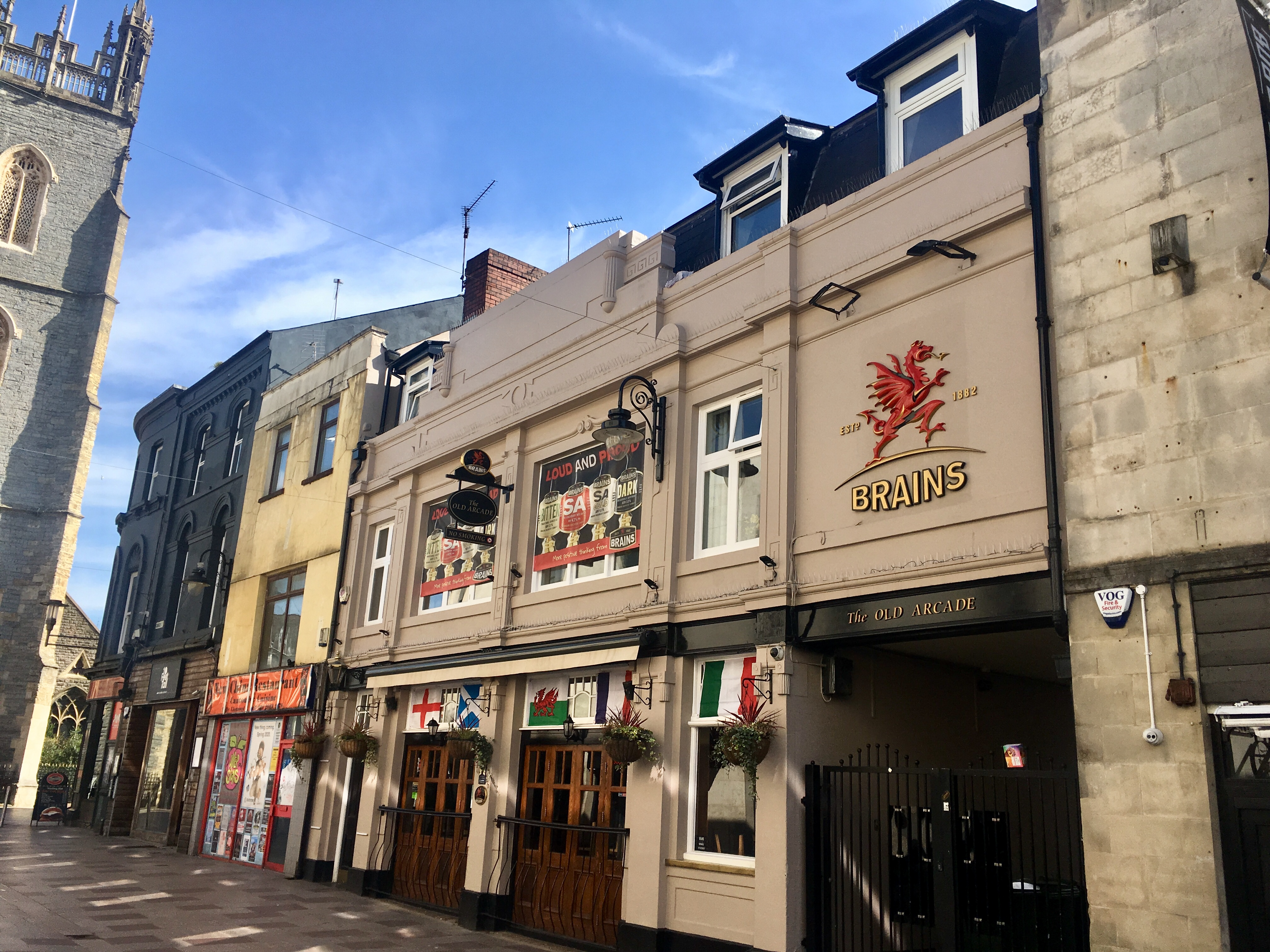
The Old Arcade pub on Church Street in Cardiff

Ownership remains in the Brain family; until 2009 the chairman was Chris Brain, and since that date the company has been led by John Rhys, the great-great-grandson of the company's founder Samuel Arthur Brain.

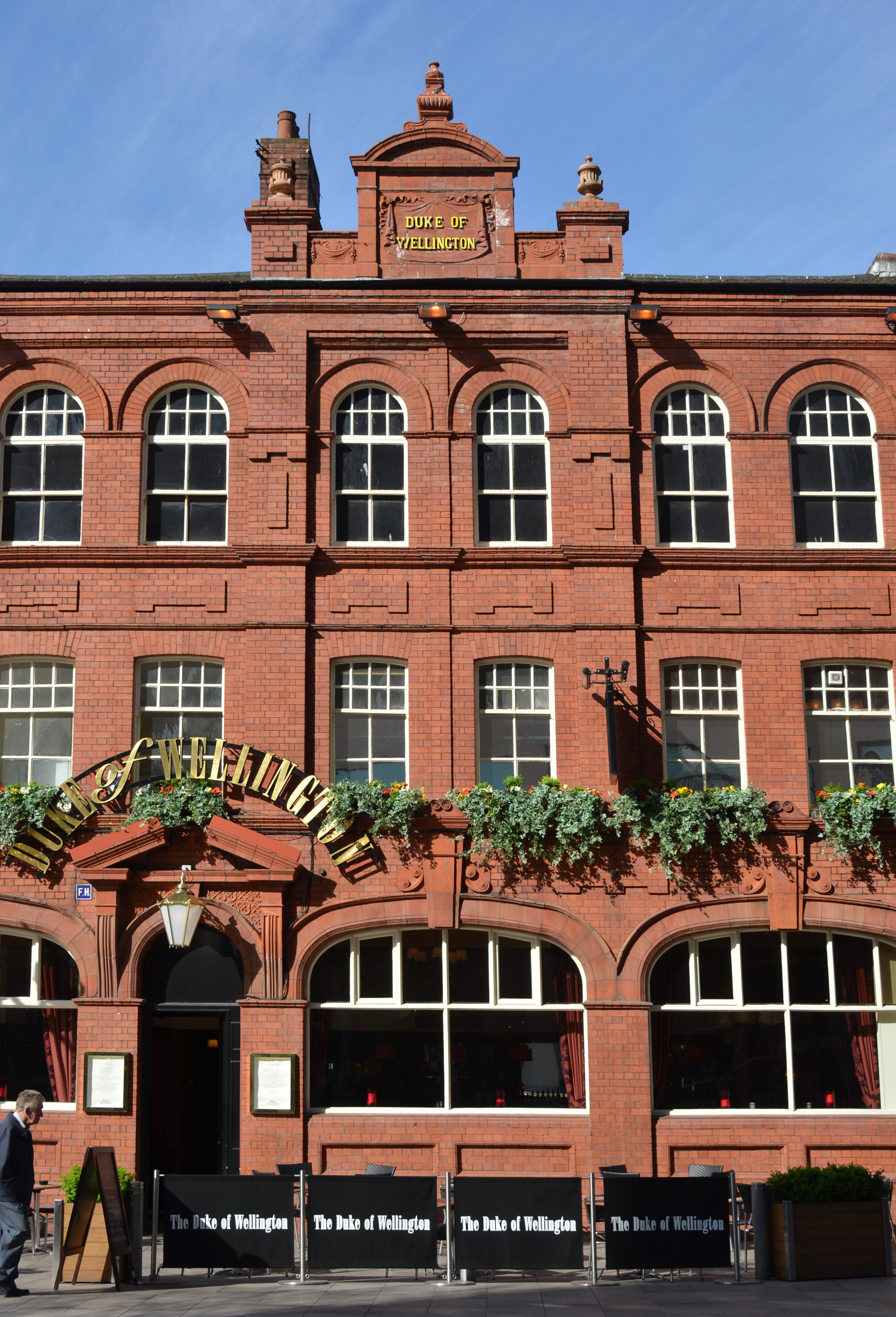
The Duke of Wellington pub on The Hayes in Cardiff

In March 2019, the new Dragon Brewery, at the Pacific Business Park in Tremorfa, was opened by Prince William, Duke of Cambridge, who was taken on a tour of the new facility by head brewer Bill Dobson.

In December 2020, Brain's handed over the running of its 156 pubs via a 25-year lease-back deal to Marston's Ninety-nine Brain's pubs were later put up for sale.

In May 2022 it was announced that Brain's had sold the freehold and leasehold of 95 of their pubs to Song Capital, with the proceeds used to pay off existing debts.

In December 2023, Brain's announced that, following the sale of their pubs, they had recovered from the debt that forced the sale following the pandemic.

=== Coffee ===
In September 2011 the company diversified into coffee shops, buying the Cardiff-based coffee house chain, Coffee#1. In mid-2018, S.A. Brain announced that they wished to sell a majority stake in Coffee#1, after a strategic review. In January 2019, Caffè Nero bought a 70% stake in the business, which at that time had 92 outlets.

In February 2022 it was announced that Brain's had sold their remaining stake in the business to Caffe Nero.

== Beer brands ==
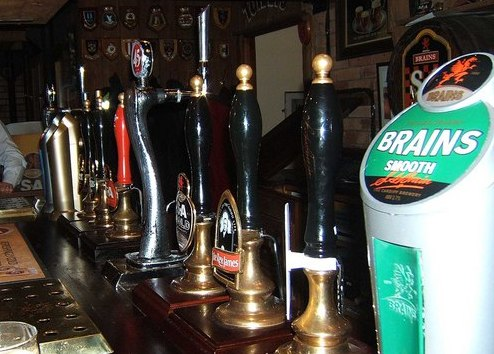
Beer taps with badges of some of the Brains range

=== Brains brand ===
Brains SA, the company's flagship brand, is a light-coloured malty best bitter which is colloquially known as "Skull Attack". Its formulation has undergone several revisions since the beer was launched in the early 20th century; the most recent revision was launched in early 2006 and increases the quantity of hops in the brew.

Brains Dark is a dark mild ale with an emphasis on roasted malts. There is also a 'smooth' variant.

Brains Bitter is the brewery's standard bitter and the most commonly available in Cardiff. Many Brains' pubs serve only bitter from a cask. When served pasteurised and nitrogenated it is termed Brains Smooth.

Brains IPA, an unusually malty example of the India Pale Ale style, is usually seen on cask only in the valleys outside Cardiff, although some pubs stock it as keg beer or in bottles in Cardiff proper.

SA Gold, a golden ale. According to a release note sent out to Brains pubs in early 2006, it was part Brains' attempts to branch out into both the English and youth markets, areas in which Brains was visibly struggling. Its official launch was June 2006, but many houses retired it in favour of the bi-monthly guest ale rotation. The beer is hopped with Cascade, Target and Styrian Golding hops.

The Rev. James is a 4.5% ABV dark best bitter carried over from the Buckley's range after the two breweries merged.

Brains Black is a 4.1% ABV stout launched on St David's Day 2010.

Barry Island IPA originally launched in June 2012 as part of the Brains Craft Brewery range, Barry Island IPA is an American style IPA brewed using a trio of American Hops. In 2019 it got a new look and became part of the core range.

Bayside Lager is a 4.3% lager launched in August 2020. It is a crisp and light lager and currently only available in draught form, although it is available in mini-keg online.

=== Buckley's brand ===
Brains bought the Llanelli-based Crown Buckley in 1998. It continues to brew three Buckley's beers, all at its Cardiff brewery: Buckley's Bitter, Buckley's IPA and Reverend James best bitter.

=== Hancock's brand ===
Hancocks HB is a 3.6% session bitter first brewed by Hancock's brewery. Formerly Wales' biggest brewer, the brewery was founded by William Hancock (father of Frank, Froude and William Hancock) and bought by Bass in 1968. Brains bought Hancock's in 1999, but initially Bass kept the rights to the brands. Production later came back to Cardiff.

== Seasonal beers ==
Seasonal beers' include St David's Ale', which is brewed to celebrate St David's Day and is available in February and March. Taff End is available in June and July and celebrates sponsorship of the Glamorgan County Cricket Club. Brains' Bread of Heaven, named after a traditional Welsh rugby anthem, was launched in 2005 in commemoration of the sponsorship, and is mostly sold during the Six Nations Championship and autumn internationals.

Hen Wlad Fy Nhadau (Land Of My Fathers) was launched in 2006 to commemorate the 150th anniversary of the Welsh national anthem. It is a golden ale brewed with Welsh honey.

== Marketing ==
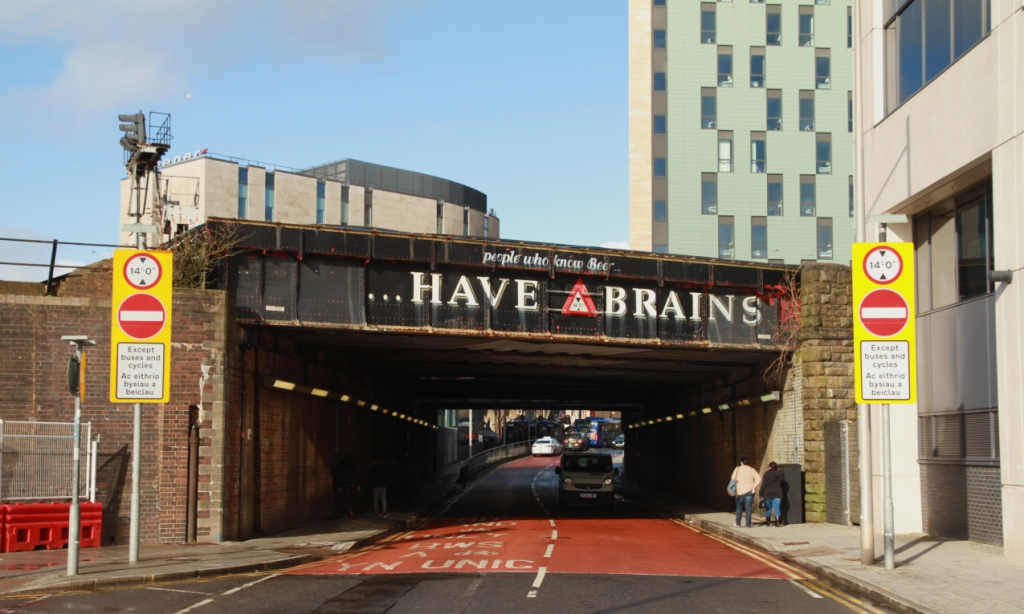
Railway bridge over Penarth Road, Cardiff: one of several painted with Brains advertising slogans

Brains sponsored a number of railway bridges over roads in Cardiff to have its advertising slogans painted on them. They include "It's Brains you want!" in Clare Road and Leckwith Road and "People who know beer... have Brains" in Penarth Road.

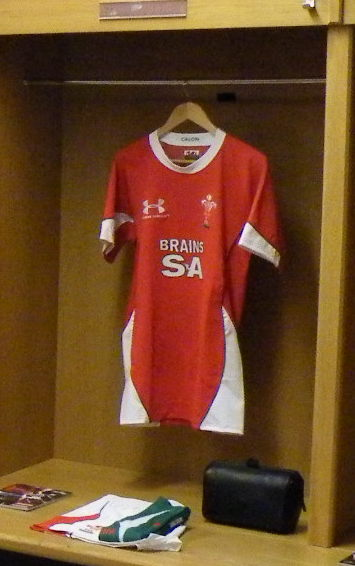
The Wales national rugby union team's dressing room with the Brains SA logo on the shirts

Brains was the shirt sponsor for the Wales national rugby union team from 2004 until 2010. As French law forbids alcohol sponsorship logos from appearing on rugby jerseys, when the team played in France the branding was changed. In 2005, "Brains" was replaced with "Brawn", in 2007 it was changed to "Brawn Again", and in 2009 it was replaced with "Try Essai", a pun on the invitation to "try SA".

== The Old Brewery Quarter ==
In 2003, Brain's vacant Old Brewery was redeveloped into the 85,000 sq ft (7,900 m^{2}) "Old Brewery Quarter" .It is a mixed development of 55,000 sq ft (5,100 m^{2}) of leisure space around an open-air piazza in the heart of Cardiff's growing city centre, together with 42 long-leasehold loft style apartments and penthouses.

The development has attracted a range of bar and restaurant operators including Chiquito, La Tasca, Lava Lounge, Nando's, Pancake House, Starbucks, Thai Edge and the S.A. Brain's owned flagship venue, the Yard Bar and Kitchen.

Chronology of Brain's Breweries
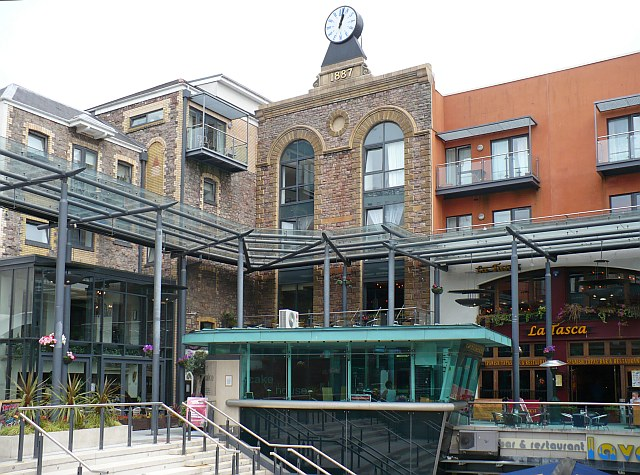
The Old Brewery (1882–2003)
The image was taken after the brewery was converted into a mixed-use development of shops, restaurants and flats.

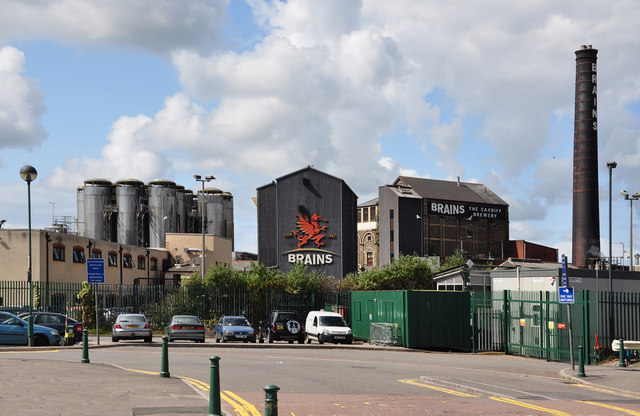
The Cardiff Brewery (2003–2019)
on the former Hancock's site that Brain's bought from Bass in 1999. The site is being redeveloped and is called Central Quay.

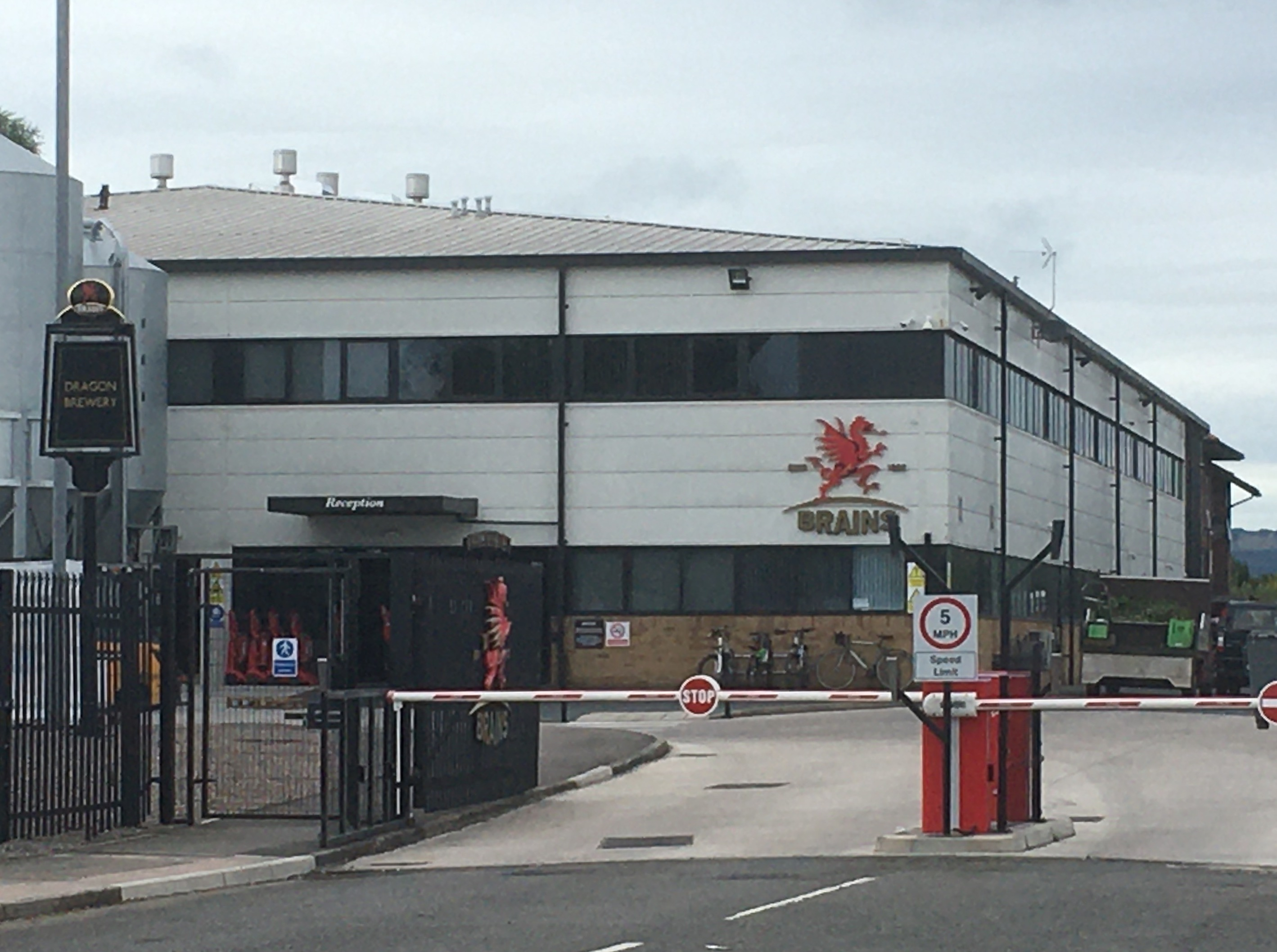
The Dragon Brewery (2019–present),
which opened on 16 March 2019 and is the current Brain's brewery.
