= Harris + Hoole =

British coffeehouse company

Harris + Hoole Ltd.

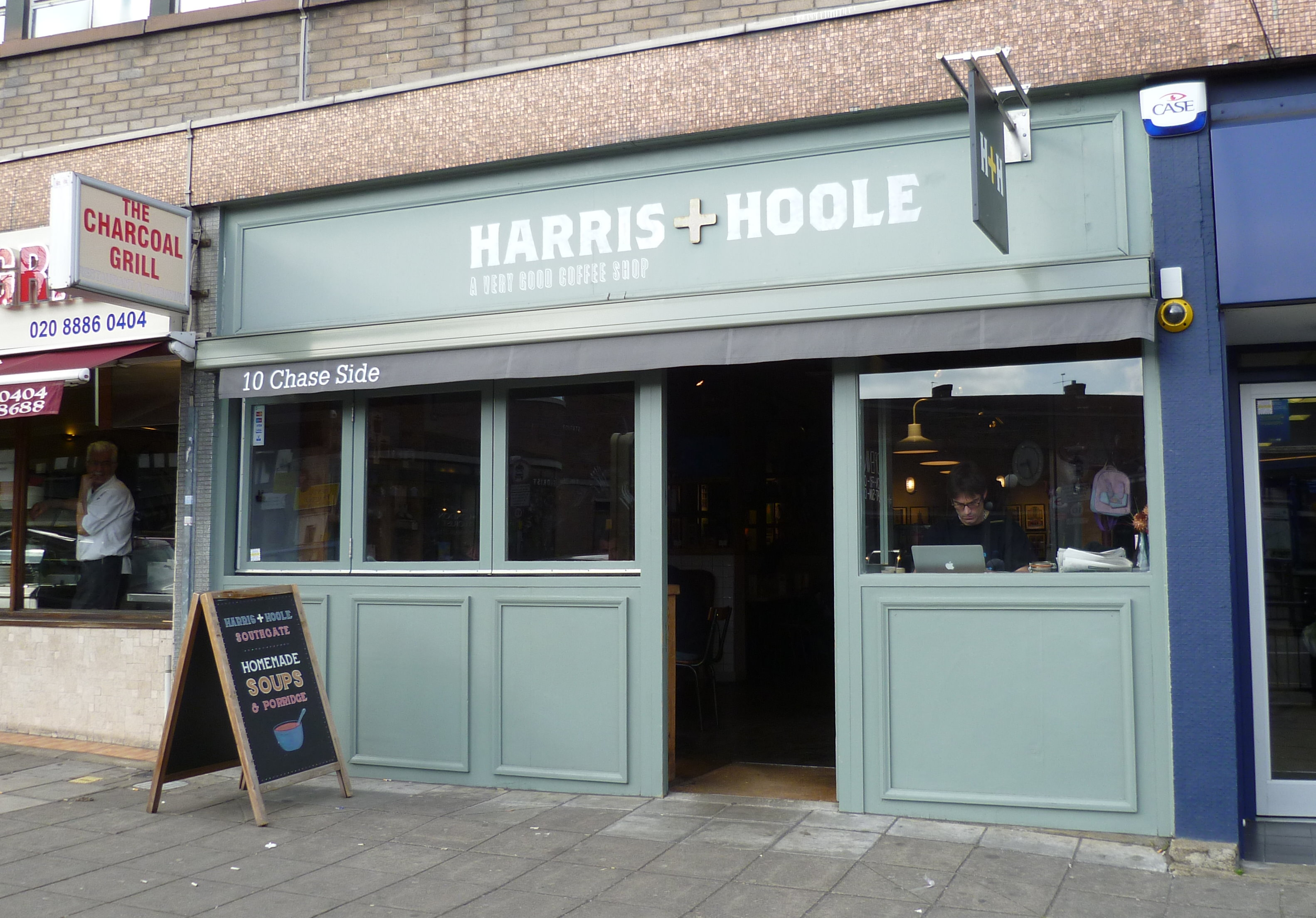
- A Harris + Hoole coffee shop in London
- Company type: Limited company
- Industry: Hospitality
- Founded: 2012
- Founders: Andrew Tolley; Nick Tolley; Laura Tolley
- Headquarters: London, England, UK
- Number of locations: 39 (2020)
- Area served: United Kingdom
- Key people: Andrew Sanders, Head of Harris and Hoole
- Products: Coffee, tea, soft drinks
- Owner: Caffè Nero
- Website: www.harrisandhoole.co.uk

Harris and Hoole (stylised as Harris + Hoole) is a British coffeehouse company headquartered in London and wholly owned by Caffè Nero. It was established in 2012 by Andrew, Nick and Laura Tolley, with investment from the British supermarket chain Tesco. The Harris + Hoole name comes from two coffee-loving characters in Samuel Pepys' diary.

In February 2016, Tesco purchased the remaining 51% holding in the company that it did not already own to take full control of the business. It sold the company to Caffè Nero Group Ltd in June 2016 for an undisclosed sum.

Harris and Hoole Ltd is wholly owned, through a long chain of intermediary companies – including UK-based Nero Group Holdings Ltd and its parent company Luxembourg-based Rome Intermediate Holdings Sarl – by the holding company Saratoga Limited based on the Isle of Man.

== History ==
The business was launched in 2012 by Nick, Laura and Andrew Tolley, with the retailer Tesco taking a 49% stake in the business. Tesco's investment in the company was controversial, as Harris + Hoole appeared to be an independent chain competing with the major companies Starbucks and Costa Coffee. Tesco owned 49% of the company, with Andrew, Nick and Laura Tolley owning the remaining 51% of shares. The Tolleys quit the running of the business in July 2015, in order to concentrate on their Taylor St Baristas chain.

In April 2015, Ethical Consumer ranked Harris + Hoole the lowest in an assessment of the social and environmental impacts of coffee shops. According to Ethical Consumer the company did not provide information on any ethical, environmental or supply chain policies, and used a direct trade model of sourcing from farmers which did not give the same kind of price support as Fairtrade. In response Harris + Hoole stated that their direct trade supplier sourced high quality coffee and aimed to create sustainable livelihoods for small scale farmers.

Tesco purchased the 51% holding in the company it did not already own in February 2016. On 23 June 2016 Tesco announced the sale of the company to Caffè Nero in order to focus on its core UK supermarket business.

== Sites ==
In March 2014, the company announced it planned to increase its number of shops to 60. In August that year, it announced that six unprofitable shops would be closed, leaving 41 in operation. As of September 2020, the chain has 39 coffee shops.
