= Samuel Brain =

Founder of Brain's Brewery, Wales (1850-1902)

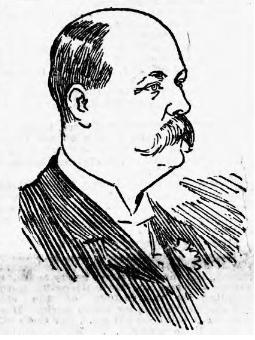
Drawing of Alderman Brain published in The Weekly Mail with his obituary article on 21 February 1903

Samuel Arthur Brain (4 May 1850 – 19 February 1902) was a brewery entrepreneur in Cardiff, Wales, founder of Brain's Brewery. He was also a JP and local councillor, becoming an alderman and Mayor of Cardiff.

== Background ==
Brain was born in Bristol on 4 May 1850, to Samuel Brain, a timber merchant, and his wife, Emma who were both Welsh. He married in 1872 the daughter of Mr J. Thomas, the owner of Cardiff's Old Brewery.

== Brain's Brewery ==
By 1882, Brain was running the Phoenix Brewery in Working Street, Cardiff. In December 1882 with the help of his uncle Joseph Benjamin Brain, he purchased the long-established Old Brewery, St Mary Street, from his brother-in-law, John G. Thomas. The business went from producing 100 barrels of beer a week for its 11 licensed public houses, to producing 1,000 barrels of beer and owning 80 public houses in 1900. In 1897 the business became a limited company, S. A. Brain & Co. Ltd, which paid £350,000 for the brewery. Samuel Brain became chairman and managing director.

== Politics and public service ==
Prior to his heavy involvement in business, Brain was a member of the Glamorgan Artillery Volunteers, becoming a sergeant. He later became captain of the No. 7 (Cardiff) Company and ultimately a major in the No. 11 (Barry) Company before his death.

Brain was persuaded to stand for elected office in 1885 and became a Conservative councillor on Cardiff Town Council for the Canton ward. After ward boundary changes in 1891, Brain was elected councillor for the Grangetown ward, despite it being a 'Radical' supporting, working class district. As an alderman of the county borough, he chaired the Cardiff County Borough Council finance committee. In November 1899 he was elected Mayor of Cardiff, serving for 12 months.

== Death ==
Brain died on 19 February 1903 aged 52, at his home on Plymouth Road, Penarth. He had been taken ill in London on 11 February and it was believed he had later suffered a blood clot on the brain. He was buried at St Augustine's Church, Penarth, on the 23 February 1903. An estimated 15,000 people lined the streets of Penarth, with a funeral procession including representatives of Cardiff Council, Penarth District Council, Cardiff Conservative Association, Cardiff Licensed Victuallers Association, the Glamorgan County Police (on horse and on foot), the Glamorgan Imperial Yeomanry, 300 of the Glamorgan Volunteer Artillery and a Royal Field Artillery gun carriage.
