= Gerry Ford (businessman) =

London-based American businessman (born 1957)

Gerry Ford (born 4 November 1957) is an American businessman. He is the founder and chief executive officer (CEO) of Caffè Nero, the third-largest coffee chain in the United Kingdom.

== Early life ==
Gerry Ford is the son of an American university professor of education. He accompanied his father on sabbaticals to European countries. He grew up in Silicon Valley.

Ford has a BA from Stanford University, a MALD degree from The Fletcher School at Tufts University, an MBA from INSEAD, and a PhD from Oxford University.

== Career ==
His first job was as a financial analyst for Hewlett-Packard. He cites Bill Hewlett and Dave Packard as role models.

He came to the UK to work in venture capital at Apax Partners, where he stayed for three years. He co-founded Paladin Partners, an equity company, in 1991.

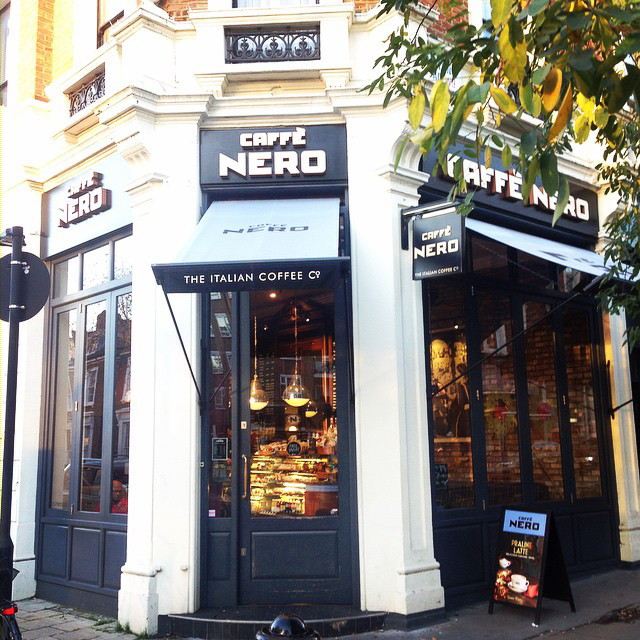
Caffè Nero in Maida Vale

=== Caffè Nero ===
Caffè Nero had been established as an Italian coffee concept in South Kensington in 1990 by Ian Semp; the company with five central London branches was sold to Paladin soon in same year 1990.

Paladin Partners established Caffè Nero in 1990 in South Kensington, with five branches. At the time most people drank coffee from instant coffee bought in the supermarket. As of January 2024, Caffè Nero has over 1,000 branches in 11 countries.

In March 2001 the company joined the London Stock Exchange. He took the company off the stock exchange in 2007. The company's headquarters are in Covent Garden. In 2020, Ford said that he had spent 70% of his life in Europe, and that this is where he developed a passion for and understanding of coffee and coffee houses.

== Personal life ==
Ford lives in Kensington. He is married to Amanda and has two sons.
