= Caffè Nero =

European style coffee house brand

Caffè Nero Group Ltd.

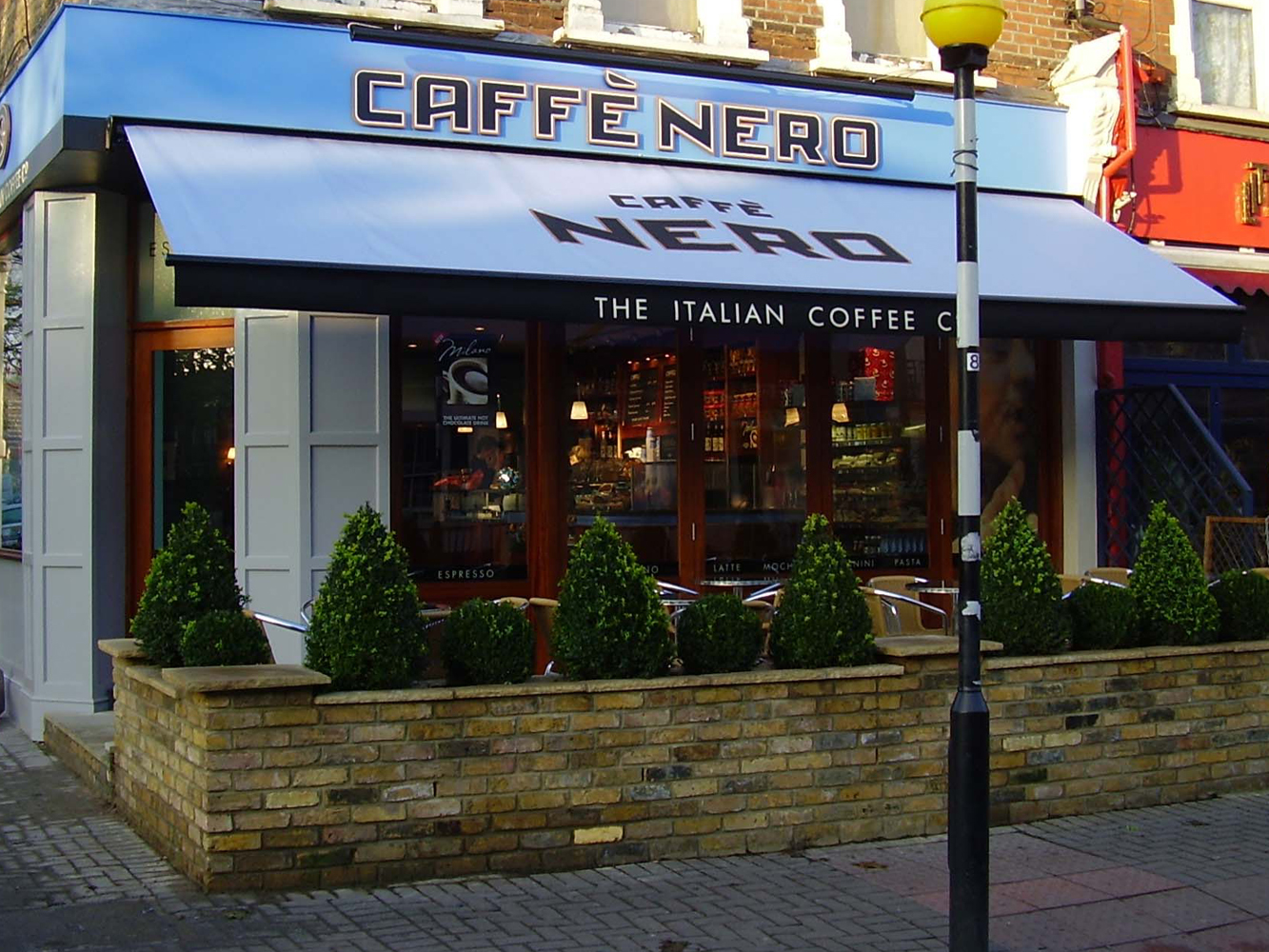
- Wandsworth Bridge Road Caffè Nero
- Type: Private company limited by shares
- Industry: Coffee shops
- Founded: 1997
- Founder: Ian Semp
- Headquarters: London, England
- Number of locations: ▲1,017 (2019)
- Key people: Gerry Ford (Chairman, and CEO)
- Products: Espresso based coffees; Frappé; Tea; Savoury; Sweet goods
- Revenue: ▲£227.9 million GBP
- Number of employees: ▲5,000
- Subsidiaries: Harris + Hoole; Coffee #1; Aroma Coffee; Coffee 200°; Compass Coffee
- Website: caffenero.com

Caffè Nero (Italian for 'Black Coffee') is a premium coffee brand under The Nero Group – the largest independent coffeehouse group in Europe – headquartered in London, England. The brand, as it is recognised today, was established in 1997 by Gerry Ford. Caffè Nero runs over 1,000 coffee houses in eleven countries: the UK, Ireland, Sweden, Poland, Cyprus, Croatia, Turkey, the UAE, Oman and the United States. In 2009, Caffè Nero bought and opened its own coffee roastery in Battersea, south London, which supplies the coffee to all its coffee houses and coffee brands worldwide.

Caffè Nero Ltd is majority owned through intermediary companies, including UK-based Nero Group Holdings Ltd and Luxembourg-based Rome Intermediate Holdings Sarl, by Founder and CEO Gerry Ford. The company successfully dismissed a hostile takeover attempt by EG Group during the COVID-19 pandemic.

== History ==
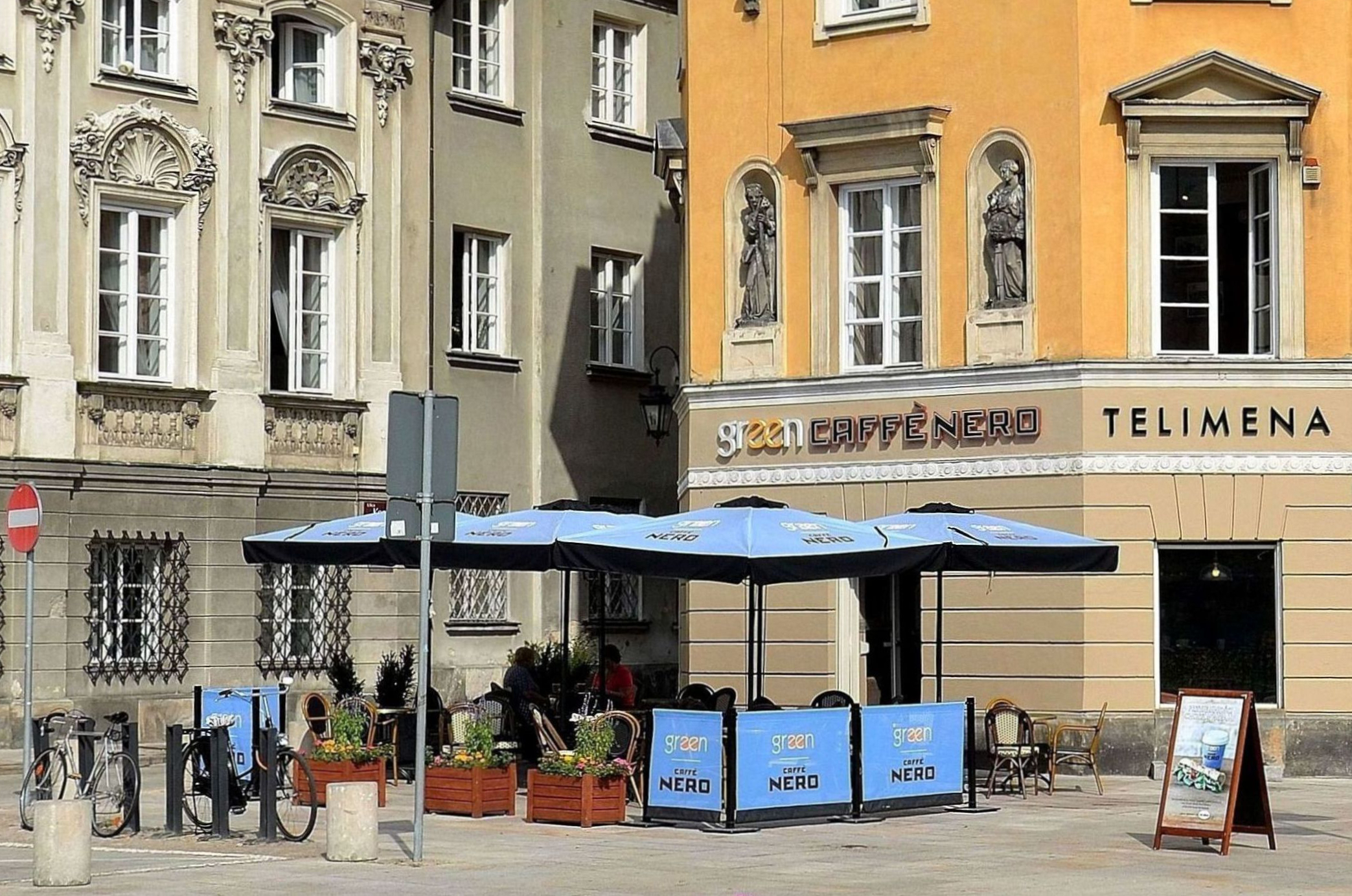
Café in Warsaw, Poland, where it is branded as 'green Caffè Nero'

Caffè Nero, the family-owned-and-operated brand as known today, was established in 1990 by Ian Semp. Gerry Ford purchased the five London-based outlets from Semp in 1997. Ford introduced the signature coffee house blend Classico, which has gone on to receive awards for its quality. The Classico blend is still served in every store today, alongside various single-origin and speciality blend coffees.

In March 2001, Caffè Nero joined the London Stock Exchange under the symbol CFN. In early 2007, the company was the subject of a management buy-out by the newly formed Rome Bidco Ltd and taken private. The company expanded to Turkey in 2007, the UAE in 2009, Poland in 2012, Cyprus in 2013, Ireland and the United States in 2014, Croatia in 2017, Oman in 2018 and Sweden.

In 2013, Caffè Nero's coffee was rated best-tasting among five major UK brands by experts at the independent consumer magazine, Which?.

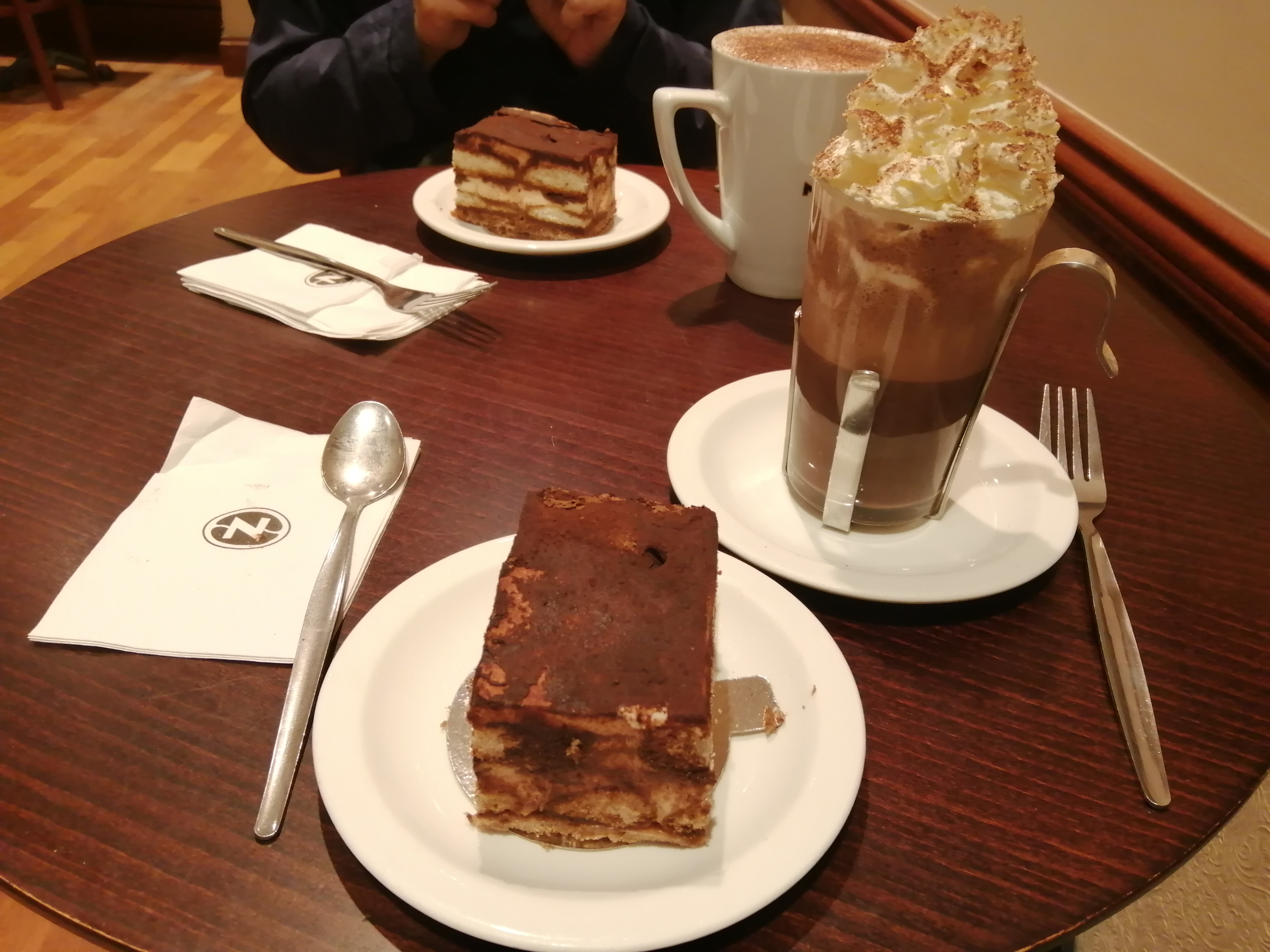
Tiramisu and Hot Chocolate at Caffè Nero, Crawley.

In 2014, Caffè Nero began expanding into the United States with its first location in Boston. The company positioned its offering as a European-style coffee house, distinct from the fast-service model associated with major American chains. According to its founder, Gerry Ford, the move aimed to introduce a premium coffee experience based on continental European traditions. Ford, who was born in the United States and later relocated to the United Kingdom, stated that Caffè Nero saw potential in the higher-end segment of the U.S. market, which he considered less saturated.

In June 2016, the Caffè Nero Group completed the purchase of the Harris + Hoole business from Tesco, with 43 sites, and in January 2019 the Group expanded further by completing the purchase of the majority shareholding of the 100-strong coffee chain Coffee#1 located in Wales, South West England and the Midlands from SA Brains. The deal gave Caffe Nero a 67% majority stake in the business; in February 2022, Caffè Nero purchased the remaining 33%.

In 2019 they partnered with the beverage company Fever-Tree to sell two variations of the beverage espresso and tonic across its outlets.

In 2019 it set up drop-in centres and dedicated helplines for members of staff needing support with remaining in the UK and with workers' rights to support staff during Brexit.

In 2020, like many businesses in the hospitality sector, Caffè Nero suffered from poor trading conditions because of the COVID-19 pandemic. From March 2020, Caffè Nero began offering free drinks to NHS staff. This offer continued through the lockdown period.

Due to the second lockdown in November 2020, the company proposed entering a company voluntary arrangement (CVA) with its creditors. Ford hoped that successful renegotiation of rent agreements with landlords, and a reduction in overall costs, would enable the company to rebuild its business when the pandemic ended; more than 90% of creditors voted in favour in November 2020. The CVA was approved the day after Caffè Nero confirmed it had rejected an unsolicited takeover approach from the brothers Mohsin and Zuber Issa, who are behind the EG Group, stating that they had "clear intention" to disrupt the CVA "as a precursor to opportunistically acquiring the company at a later date."

In September 2021, the high court dismissed the challenge against the CVA, brought by a landlord with the backing of the Issa brothers, with Mr Justice Green ruling that the company had "acted in good faith, in accordance with their professional duties and reached a perfectly reasonable decision that it was not in the best interests of the creditors to postpone the CVA process".

In January 2022, Caffè Nero completed a £330m refinancing to give it a platform for future growth and development as well as the ability to resume its new store-opening programme as the business continued its recovery from the effects of the pandemic.

In February 2022, Caffè Nero committed to sourcing 100% cage-free eggs globally by 2026.

Despite challenging trading conditions during the COVID-19 pandemic, Caffè Nero saw a strong trading recovery following the lift of lockdown. UK sales grew by 65 per cent in the financial year ending May 2022. Worldwide group sales grew by 70 per cent. It also partnered with delivery providers to deliver coffee and food items to its customers.

In August 2022, Caffè Nero was awarded a Princess Royal Award For Outstanding Workplace Training in recognition of the impact of its workplace leader development courses.

In January 2023, the company announced that it had returned to pre-pandemic trading levels during the first half of the financial year and saw like-for-like sales during the festive period grow by 9.5% year on year. The company served 7.8 million customers during that time.

In spring 2024, Caffe Nero announced the opening of its first drive-through store, located at Stansted Airport. The £1.2m site offered drive-through and drive-to services and included charge points for electric cars.

In October 2024 Caffè Nero bought Nottingham based 200 Degrees Coffee making 200° the fifth brand to join the group. It also completed the purchase of London-based FCB coffee during the same month. The purchase was its sixth brand acquisition, taking its total number of stores to 790. In December 2024, Caffè Nero opened a branch within John Lewis' White City store. Additionally, it opened five of its Best of Both concept cafes in selected Waitrose stores. The Best of Both concept combined Caffè Nero's coffee with Waitrose's food.

Caffe Nero reported strong sales growth for the first half of the 2024 fiscal year. This sales performance was followed by record sales during the UK's festive period. In December 2024, Caffè Nero achieved two record sales weeks and its highest ever single day of sales with £1.5m, the equivalent of its total sales during its first full year of trading.

In early 2026, the company acquired the 17 store Compass Coffee, a Washington DC based chain, in an auction for $4.76 million, after the chain filed for Chapter 11 bankruptcy.

== Nero Book Awards ==
In May 2023, Caffè Nero launched an annual book award. The four categories are fiction, non-fiction, debut fiction and children's literature. It is open to authors based in the UK and Ireland. Paul Murray's The Bee Sting won the inaugural gold prize for book of the year.

In its second year, Bill Bryson chaired the judges. The gold prize judging panel also included Booker Prize winning author and Royal Society of Literature president, Bernardine Evaristo, alongside the journalist Emily Maitlis. Sophie Elmhirst's Maurice and Maralyn was announced as the winner of the Nero book of the year, winning the £50,000 prize.

== Corporation tax ==
As of 2014 Caffè Nero had not paid any corporation tax in the UK since 2007 on sales of £2 billion and had been subject to criticism, although the BBC reported that "there is no suggestion that Caffe Nero has done anything illegal" and that "Caffe Nero has previously rejected accusations that its complex corporate structure involving various holding companies is designed to avoid corporation tax."

== See also ==
- List of coffeehouse chains
