= The Fragrance Shop =

British perfume retail chain

TFS Buying Limited
- Logo used since 2011
- Industry: Retail
- Founded: 1994
- Founder: Sanjay Vadera
- Headquarters: Manchester
- Number of locations: 200+ (2026)
- Products: Perfume, Aftershave, Fragrance
- Website: https://www.thefragranceshop.co.uk

TFS Buying Limited (trading as The Fragrance Shop) is a British fragrance retailer founded in 1994 by Sanjay Vadera. The company is based in Manchester.

== History ==
In September 2013, the retailer announced its own-brand perfume, Indulge Fragrances.

In September 2018, the retailer announced a concession trial with supermarket chain Sainsbury's.

In July 2021, the retailer announced it had opened its 200th store.

Throughout 2023, the retailer increased expansion plans, including a flagship store on Oxford Street.

In 2024, the Fragrance Shop constructed a fragrance wall in its Manchester headquarters, showcasing 3,000 perfumes and breaking the Guinness World Record for largest display of perfumes.

In 2025, it was reported the retailer were looking to open their first international location in Dublin.

In 2025, the retailer launched a new perfume brand, Fraegra, co-founded by Dylan Vadera and Viyan Vadera. That year, for Christmas shopping, The Fragrance Shop partnered with Uber Direct for delivery of their products directly to consumers.
