= Black Sheep Coffee =

British coffeehouse company

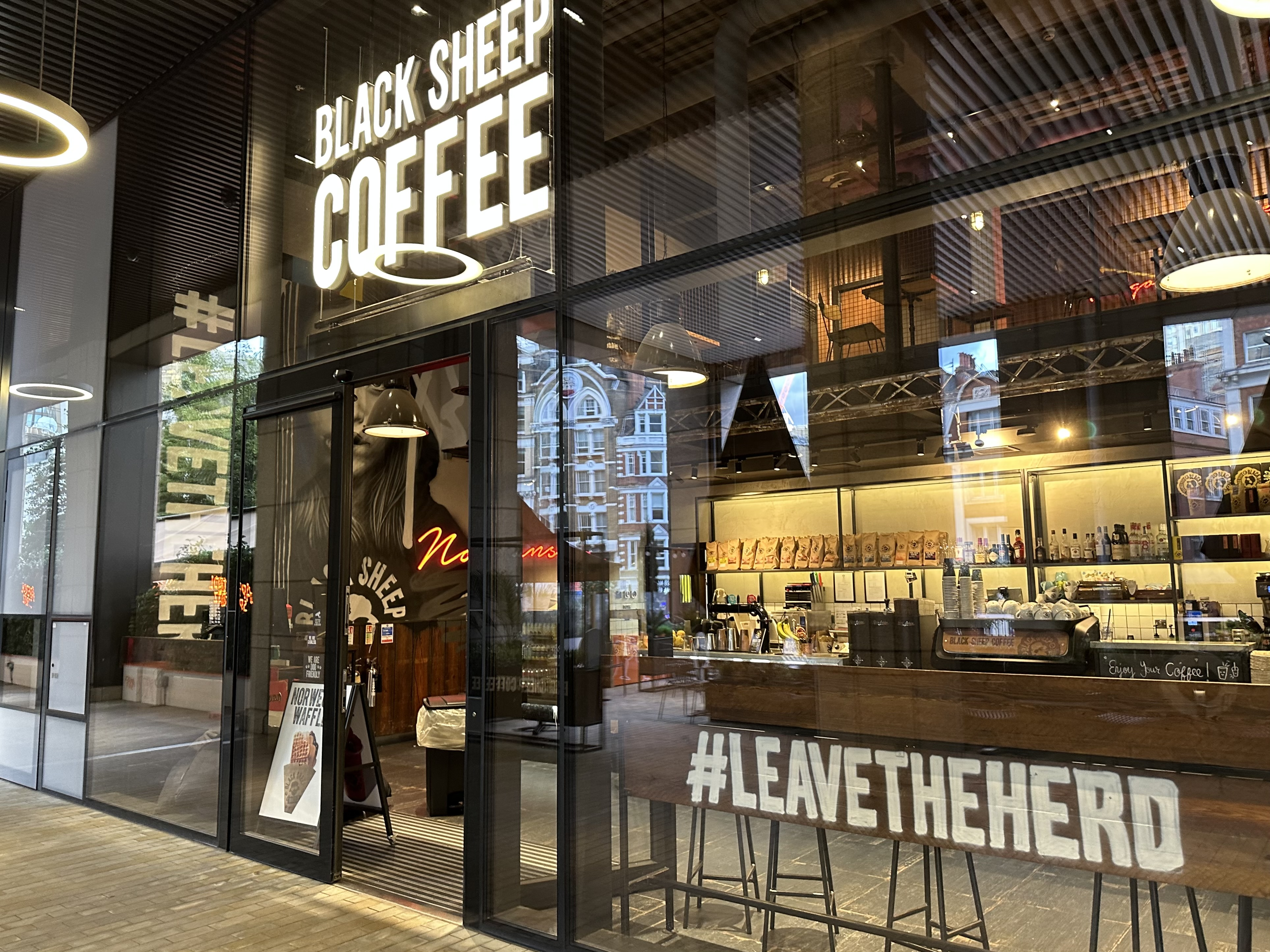
- A Black Sheep Coffee branch in Bishopsgate, London
- Industry: Coffee shop
- Founded: 2013; 13 years ago; London, England
- Founders: Gabriel Shohet and Eirik Holth
- Headquarters: Stockwell, London, England
- Area served: Worldwide
- Products: Coffee, tea, sandwiches, sweet snacks and iced drinks
- Website: blacksheepcoffee.co.uk

Black Sheep Coffee is a British coffeehouse chain headquartered in London, England.

== History ==
Black Sheep Coffee was founded in 2013 by Gabriel Shohet and Eirik Holth, who had been flatmates at the University of St Andrews. In 2014, they raised £23,000 on the crowdfunding site Kickstarter.

In June 2019, Black Sheep Coffee raised £13 million, bringing the total raised to £19 million, all from private investors, and valuing the business at £109.2 million. Later that year, it took over eight stores from rival Taylor St Baristas, which was entering administration.

In 2021, Black Sheep received investment from basketball player Kristaps Porziņģis to support expansion into the United States. In 2022, the UK government became a shareholder in the company when it was backed by the Future Fund, a scheme to support companies affected by the COVID‑19 pandemic.

Trade press reported that Black Sheep Coffee more than doubled revenue from £10.7 million in 2021 to £21.3 million in 2022, while remaining loss‑making as it expanded its estate. By March 2023, the chain had more than 50 locations in the United Kingdom. In March 2025 it raised a further £11.5 million of liquidity through a mixture of debt and equity to support growth and provide additional working capital.

As of September 2025, Black Sheep Coffee remained majority‑owned by its two founders, rather than by private equity investors.

== Products ==
Black Sheep Coffee is known for using robusta coffee beans in its coffee, at a time when much of the specialty coffee industry focused on 100% Arabica beans. The company sells its roasted beans for home use through its shops and online store.

Its shops offer a range of barista‑prepared coffees, teas and iced drinks alongside smoothies, pastries, bagels, toasties, sandwiches and Norwegian waffles. Some locations serve alcohol in the evening, including cocktails such as espresso martinis.

== Social responsibility ==
In 2015, Black Sheep Coffee introduced a "Free Coffee Board" or "coffee board" scheme at its first shop in Fitzrovia, London, allowing customers to buy or donate a drink that can later be redeemed by someone who cannot afford one. The scheme, described in local and London media, has been framed as a way of involving customers in supporting homeless people and reducing social exclusion in the cafes where it operates.

The company has also promoted the use of compostable takeaway packaging and cups, supplied by specialist providers, as part of its environmental positioning.

== Locations ==
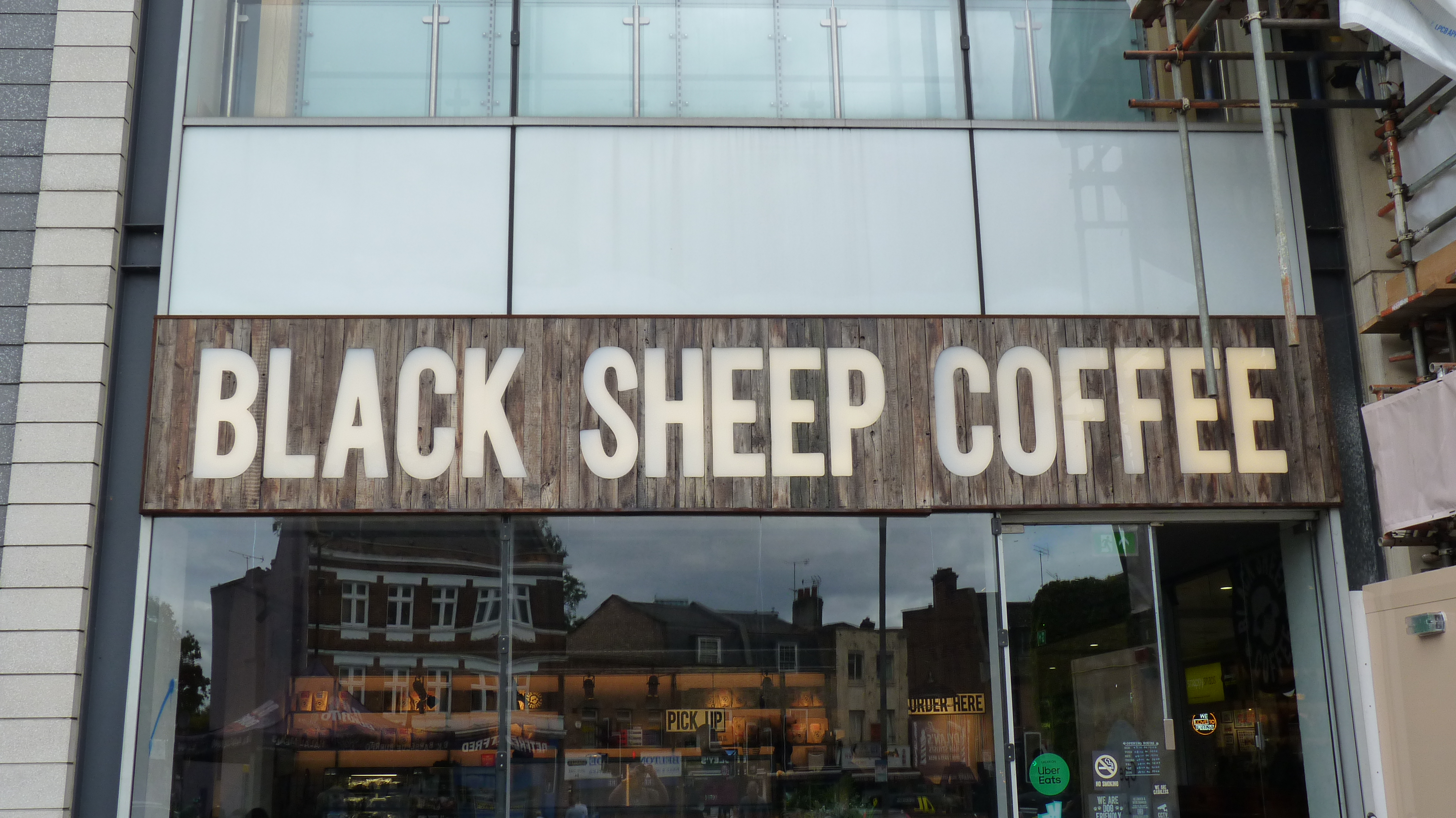
Coffee shop in East Putney

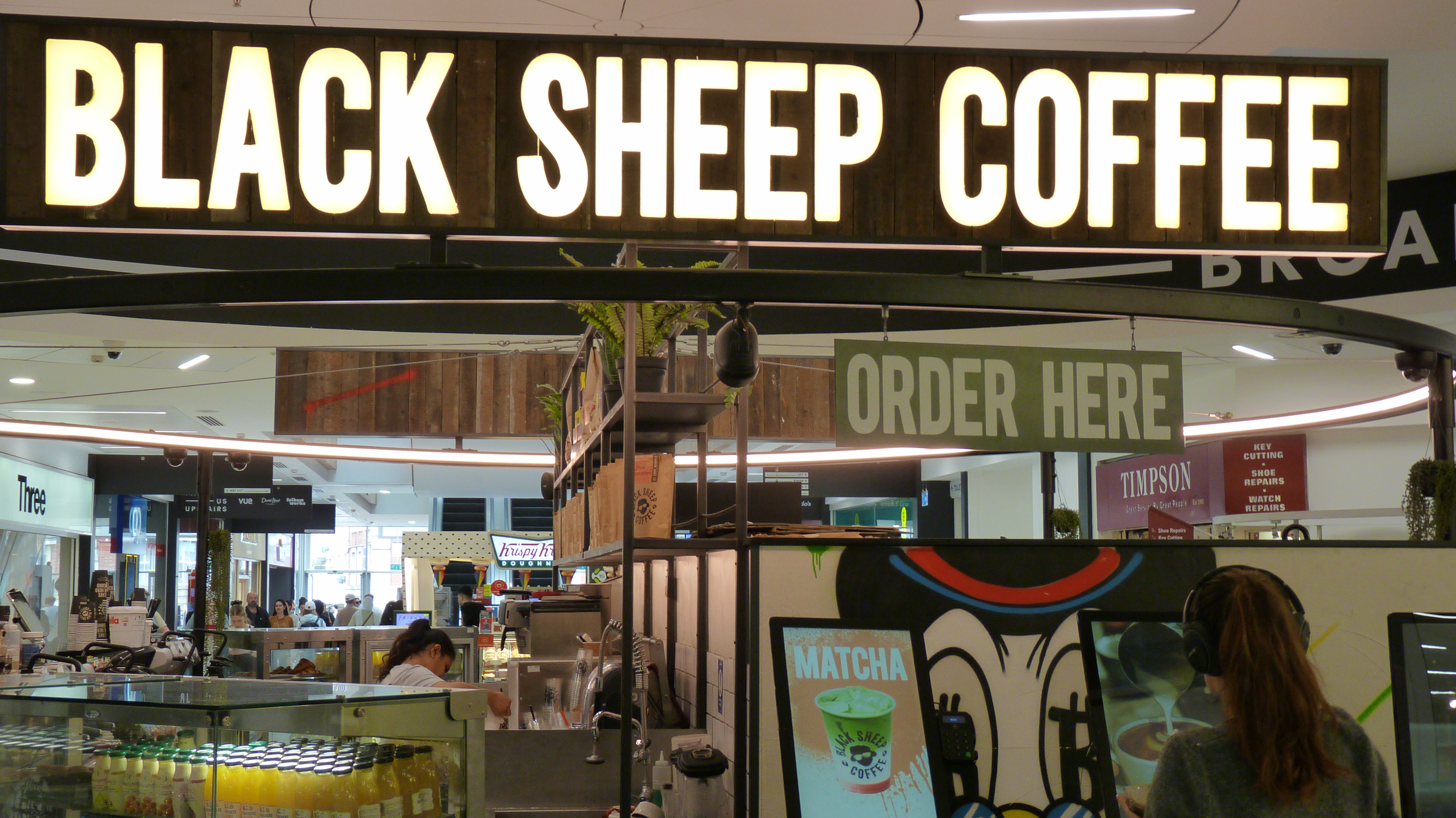
Outlet at Fulham Broadway

Black Sheep Coffee's shops are mostly concentrated within London, England, where it is headquartered, but they also have a significant presence in Scotland, where its founders were flatmates. As of November 2026, 51 of its shops are located within London, with 28 in Scotland.

Black Sheep Coffee shops worldwide
| Country | Number of locations |
|---|---|
| United Kingdom | 128 |
| United Arab Emirates | 5 |
| United States of America | 6 |
