= Geology of the Gower Peninsula =

Overview of the geology of Gower, Wales

The geology of the Gower Peninsula in South Wales is central to the area's character and to its appeal to visitors. The peninsula is formed almost entirely from a faulted and folded sequence of Carboniferous rocks though both the earlier Old Red Sandstone and later New Red Sandstone are also present. Gower lay on the southern margin of the last ice sheet and has been a focus of interest for researchers and students in that respect too. Cave development and the use of some for early human occupation is a further significant aspect of the peninsula's scientific and cultural interest.

== Overview of the geological history of the region ==
The collision of the micro-continent of Avalonia with the Laurentian continent during the middle Palaeozoic caused the Caledonian orogeny which led to the formation and rapid erosion of sizeable mountain ranges across what is now the north of Britain. The Old Red Sandstone seen in Gower, as elsewhere in South Wales and beyond, is the debris brought south by rivers as these mountains eroded rapidly during the Devonian period. From the start of the Carboniferous period, South Wales lay beneath a shallow tropical sea in which over a 30 million year period, a succession of lime rich sediments accumulated, manifest today as the Carboniferous Limestone of Gower and other parts of the region. Subsequently deltas extended across the area first from the north and then the south, leaving a thick pile of mud and sand and pebbles, traditionally recognised as the Millstone Grit Series, though referred to today as the Marros Group in South Wales. The expansion of tropical forests across the region at the end of the Carboniferous period and their periodic demise through sea level fluctuations left the coal seams of the South Wales Coalfield, a basin which extends through the northern part of the peninsula. At this time, a further continental collision had started to the south; South Wales was on the northern margin of this mountain building event, the Variscan orogeny, evidence for which is seen in the relatively intense faulting and folding of the rocks along the Glamorgan Coast, through Gower and into Pembrokeshire.

A period of uplift and weathering followed, much of the detail of which remains speculative in Gower and elsewhere in Wales, before the region was once again intermittently inundated by the sea. A series of marine erosion platforms, as seen in the present-day landscape of Gower, were carved at some time during this period, prior to the onset of a series of ice ages during the last 2.6 million years, the Quaternary period. The southern edge of the last ice sheet lay across Gower. Cave development took place in this period and the human influence on the landscape has become more dominant from the first evidence of human occupation of caves on what is now the peninsula's south coast, through to the Industrial Revolution commencing in the 18th century.

== Devonian ==
The Old Red Sandstone which characterises the Brecon Beacons inland is also present in Gower. The lowermost strata are exposed at the back of Rhossili Bay beneath Rhossili Down. Overlying these are the brown sandstones with thin mudstones of the Brownstones Formation. This formation is unconformably overlain by the Upper Old Red Sandstone, represented in Gower by the Pennard Conglomerate Formation. Outcrops of both are found in a narrow outcrop along Cefn Bryn and at Rhossili Down, Llanmadoc Hill and Hardings Down. There is a further exposure of the conglomerate at Ryer's Down.

== Carboniferous ==
=== Carboniferous Limestone ===
The early part of the Carboniferous period (359 - 330 million years ago) saw the deposition of a considerable thickness of limestones of differing characteristics in Gower and the wider region. Many of the formations into which the Pembroke Limestone Group is divided, and which are in use across the country, take their name from localities in Gower due to the superb exposure within the southern coastal cliffs which more readily enables details of their stratigraphy to be worked out. The Carboniferous Limestone Supergroup is represented in Gower by the following named divisions (in stratigraphical order, i.e. youngest/uppermost at top):

- Pembroke Limestone Group
  - Oystermouth Formation
  - Oxwich Head Limestone Formation
  - Hunts Bay Oolite Sub-group (formerly a 'group')
    - Stormy Limestone Formation
    - Cornelly Oolite Formation
  - High Tor Limestone Formation
  - Caswell Bay Mudstone Formation (formerly member of above)
  - Gully Oolite Formation (formerly Caswell Bay Oolite)
  - Black Rock Limestone Sub-group (formerly a 'group')(a.k.a. 'Penmaen Burrows Limestone')
    - Friars Point Limestone Formation
    - Brofiscin Oolite Formation
    - Barry Harbour Limestone Formation
- Avon Group (formerly the Lower Limestone Shale Group or Cefn Bryn Shales)

The larger part of the sequence is limestone, some of it ooidal, some of it bioclastic, whilst mudstones characterise the Oystermouth Formation (formerly known as the Upper Limestone Shale) and the Avon Group (formerly known as the Lower Limestone Shale). Confusingly, a large number of different names for parts of this sequence are encountered in the geological maps and literature of Gower and wider South Wales, reflecting the state of knowledge at the different times when rocks were surveyed.

The limestone occurs at or near the surface, south of a line drawn from Oystermouth west-northwest through Gower to Whiteford Sands. it is however buried beneath superficial deposits, glacial till in many inland areas and coastal deposits in the northwest. The finest and most extensive exposures are along the south coast from Mumbles Head to Worms Head but often wooded inland exposures exist westwards from Llanrhidian towards the coastal exposures at Hills Tor and Burry Holms.

The coastal cliffs between Overton Mere near Port Eynon and Fall Bay are formed in the High Tor Limestone, as are the 'three cliffs' at Three Cliffs Bay.

=== Marros Group ===
Overlying the limestone are the rocks of the Marros Group, formerly known as the Millstone Grit Series. Though present elsewhere in the region, the Twrch Sandstone Formation is absent in Gower, leaving the Aberkenfig and Bishopston Mudstone formations as the only two within this group represented locally. Towards the top of the Bishopston Mudstone, a number of sandstones are present, collectively referred to as the Llanelen Sandstones Member. Marros Group rocks occur as a mile wide band stretching from West Cross on the coast just north of Oystermouth, through Barland Common just north of Bishopston and thence via Pengwern Common to Llan-Elen and Cilifor Top where these rocks are exposed. There is a further outlier within the syncline at Oxwich Bay, extending inland as far as Knelston.

=== Coal Measures and Pennant Sandstone ===
The end of the Carboniferous period saw the deposition of the mudstones, sandstones and of course coal seams of the South Wales Coal Measures Group and the thick sandstones of the overlying Warwickshire Group. The Lower Coal Measures occur in a mile wide band running WNW from Sketty beneath Upper Killay to Wernffrwd though are little exposed. The Middle and Upper Coal Measures run in a parallel narrower band from beneath Swansea University to the coast at Crofty. Further north again, the stratigraphically lower parts of the Pennant Sandstone, a division of the Warwickshire Group form slightly higher ground along the margin of peninsular Gower such as that at Three Crosses.

== Structure ==
Gower is within the northern part of the Variscan orogen, that is its rocks were affected by the Variscan orogeny which took place in late Carboniferous/early Permian times. The main structural trend is ESE-WNW with a series of folds and thrust faults present across the peninsula. The main axis of the east–west aligned South Wales Coalfield syncline passes just to the north of the Gower where it is named as the Pont Lliw and Llanelli synclines east and west of the Loughor estuary respectively. The syncline 'tightens' westwards, resulting in the northward dip of the rocks of much of the peninsula towards that axis, being steeper than further east in the main part of the coalfield. The dip is reversed to the south of the Cefn Bryn anticline which runs ESE-WNW through Gower, whilst further folds, particularly in the southwest, affect the strata locally. A series of north-northeasterly directed thrust faults are associated with the fold structures, together bringing about a degree of crustal shortening as would be expected with the lateral compression of the crust effective during the continental collision.

== Triassic ==
A small outlier of a red conglomerate from this period underlies part of the village of Port Eynon.

== Quaternary ==
=== Pleistocene ===
Glacial till from the late Devensian glaciation is widespread in the interior. Sand and gravel representing ice-contact glaciofluvial deposits are found around Sketty and Oystermouth with isolated pockets of the same deposits scattered across other parts of Gower. Raised beach and cave deposits and erosional benches within the cliffs relate to varying sea-levels through the Pleistocene and have been the subject of a lot of research. A continuing topic of academic debate is the position of the ice margin during the last ice age with several models having been presented over the years. A ridge of weathered material which extends along the plateau surface in the southwest has been postulated to be an end-moraine of the Anglian Glaciation though doubt persists as to its age.

Besides serving as a Neolithic dolmen, Arthur's Stone (Welsh: Maen Ceti) is sometimes interpreted as a Twrch Sandstone glacial erratic dropped by 'Welsh ice' high on Cefn Bryn during the last ice age, after being transported south by at least 20 kilometres (12 mi). Estimates of the late Devensian ice thickness on Gower vary between 200 and 300 metres (660 and 980 ft).

=== Holocene ===
Along the coast are extensive dune systems, post-glacial accumulations of blown sand, notably at Hillend Burrows, Llangennith Burrows and Broughton Burrows around Rhossili Bay and further north at Whiteford Burrows. Further sand deposits occur at Port Eynon and again at Oxwich Burrows, Michaelston Burrows and Pennard Burrows around Oxwich Bay. Though affected by urban development there are also sand deposits along the east coast from Black Pill eastwards to Swansea, behind the modern tidal flats. Extensive salt marshes along the north coast represent substantial build-ups of marine mud, clay and silt. Inland narrow bands of alluvium floor the narrow incised valleys with wider extents at Oxwich Bay and Llangennith Moors.
