= List of Sites of Special Scientific Interest in Swansea =

Map of Swansea within Wales

This is a list of the Sites of Special Scientific Interest (SSSIs) in the Swansea Area of Search (AoS).

== Sites ==
- Barland Common Stream Section
- Berry Wood
- Bishop's Wood
- Blackpill, Swansea
- Bracelet Bay
- Burry Inlet and Loughor Estuary
- Caswell Bay
- Cefn Bryn Common
- Coedydd Parkmill a Cwm Llethrid
- Cors Crymlyn - Crymlyn Bog
- Courthouse Grasslands
- Fairwood, Pengwern and Welshmoor Commons
- Glais Moraine
- Gower Coast - Rhossili to Port Eynon
- Graig Fawr, Pontardulais
- Horton, Eastern and Western Slade
- Ilston Quarry
- Langland Bay (Rotherslade)
- Minchin Hole
- Morfa a Chraig Cwm Ivy-Cwm Ivy marsh and Tor
- Nant y Crimp
- Nicholaston Wood
- Oxwich Bay
- Oystermouth Old Quarry
- Penllergaer Railway Cutting
- Pennard Valley
- Penplas Grasslands
- Penrice Stables and Underhill Cottage
- Pwll Du Head and Bishopston Valley
- Rhossili Down
- Rose Cottage, Llethrid
- Sluxton Marsh, Whitemoor
- Whiteford Burrows, Landimore Marsh, Broughton Bay
