= List of villages on the Gower Peninsula =

Settlements on the Gower Peninsula, Wales

Gower Peninsula
- Principal area: Swansea
- Preserved county: West Glamorgan
- Country: Wales
- Sovereign state: United Kingdom
- Dialling code: 01792
- Police: South Wales
- Fire: Mid and West Wales
- Ambulance: Welsh

The Gower Peninsula (Welsh: Gŵyr) in the City and County of Swansea, Wales, contains over twenty villages and communities. Most of the peninsula is a designated Area of Outstanding Natural Beauty.

== Villages ==
=== Bishopston ===
Bishopston (Welsh: Llandeilo Ferwallt, or historically Llanmerwallt or Llancyngur Trosgardi) is an inland village, 6 miles (9.5 km) west-southwest of Swansea and near the beaches of Caswell Bay, Brandy Cove and Pwll Du. One of the larger villages in Gower, it has its own rugby club, South Gower Rugby Football Club, and its own primary and comprehensive schools. (Bishopston is part of Swansea's Bishopston ward.)

Bishopston church, at the head of Bishopston Valley, is dedicated to Saint Teilo, who gives the village its Welsh name. The church contains a plain, massive font of Romanesque type, and its tower holds two 18th-century bells. In the churchyard are the remains of an old stone cross.

=== Cheriton ===
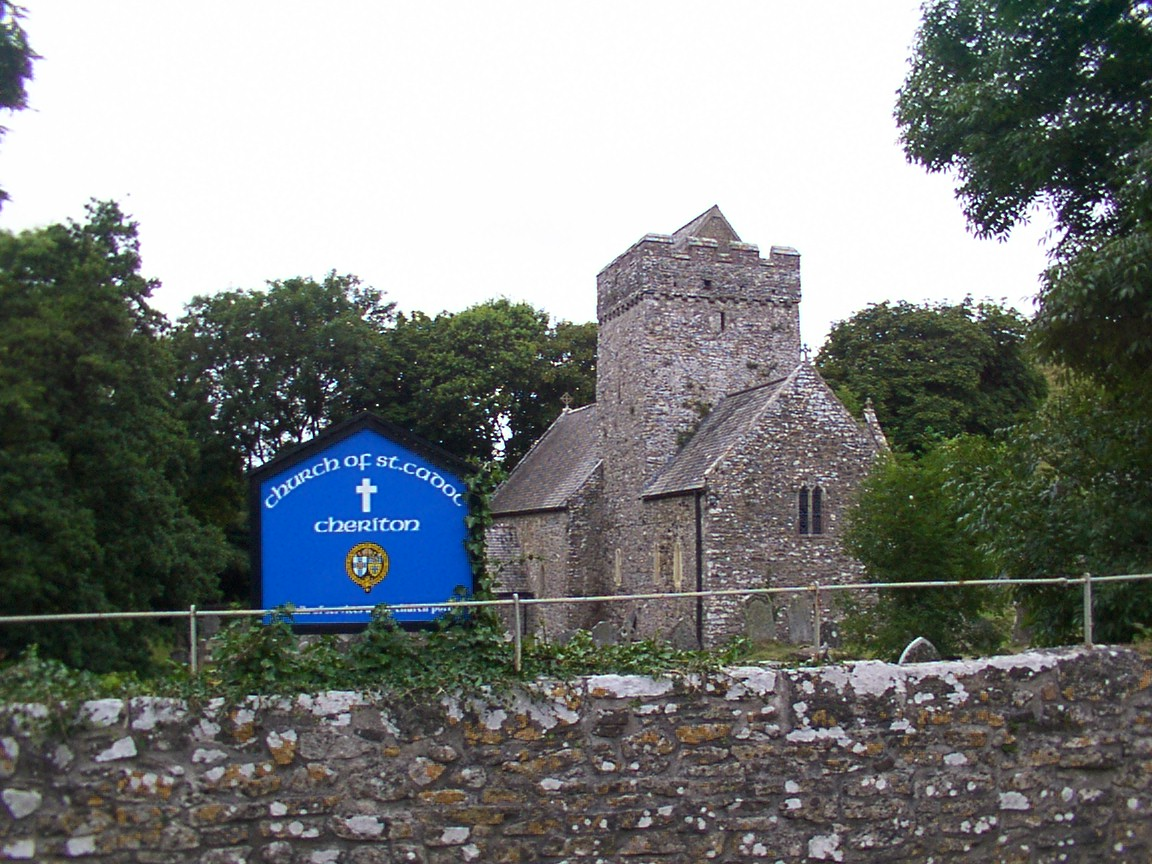
St Cadoc's Church

Cheriton, near the north coast, is a tourist destination where summer visitors stay whilst exploring the beaches in the local area. The 13th-century church of St Catwg (or Cadoc) is Grade I listed. The psychoanalyst Ernest Jones is buried in its churchyard. The author and cricketer William Collins was born at Cheriton.

Footpaths lead south-east to Stembridge and south-west to Llangenydd.51.61506°N 4.24035°W

=== Crofty ===
Crofty, on the north coast, is a small cockling village, situated between Penclawdd and Llanmorlais. 51°38′18.00″N 4°07′33.00″W

=== Gowerton ===
The inland village of Gowerton (Welsh: Tregŵyr), about 4 miles north west of Swansea city centre, is a gateway to Gower. Its original name was Ffosfelin; it has also been known as Gwter Felen. (The village falls within the Gowerton electoral ward of Swansea.)

In 1980, the Welsh National Eisteddfod was hosted on the 'Elba' area of the village. The Eisteddfod stone (Gorsedd stones) is located on the round-about opposite the garage on the road to Penclawdd.

=== Ilston ===
Ilston (Welsh: Llanilltud Gŵyr) is an inland village. It has its own community council. The population of the community in the United Kingdom Census 2001 was 538. The name of the village (Welsh: Llanilltud) is thought to have originated from Saint Illtud. The village is home to a brook, a 13th-century parish church (which has a 15th-century bell inscribed with a prayer to St Thomas) and a Wildlife Trust of South & West Wales limestone quarry. The community is surrounded by common land used as grazing land, woodlands and fields.

See also: Ilston Book

=== Llangennith ===
Llangennith (Welsh: Llangynydd), in north-west Gower, has a scattering of houses and one pub – the King's Head. It sits at a crossroads: Moor Lane leads west to a caravan park near Rhossili Bay; and Burrows Lane leads north to a caravan park overlooking Broughton Bay.

The 12th-century village church, St. Cenydd's Church, is the largest in Gower, and was founded by St. Cenydd, who in the 6th century made a hermitage here, which was destroyed by Vikings in 986. The folk singer, Phil Tanner, is buried in its churchyard.

A painting of Worm's Head from Llangennydd was made by Cedric Morris. A painting of Llangennith Burrows by John Nash is held in the Government Art Collection.

=== Llanmadoc ===
Llanmadoc (Welsh: Llanmadog) is in the north west of Gower. The village is named after the churchyard of St Madoc (or Maidoc), who founded his hermitage or monastery here in the 6th century. The 13th-century building was restored in 1865, but retains a Romanesque font and a Romano-British tombstone. Llanmadoc Hill, formed of Old Red Sandstone, is a landmark of west Gower and affords wide views from the top. An evocative painting of the Hill, by Cedric Morris, may be seen at the Glynn Vivian Art Gallery, Swansea. A painting of Llanmadoc was also made by John Nash. The Medulli were the likely Celtic tribal ancestors of Madoc. Haplogroup R1b (Y-DNA) is consistent with the regions of Llanmadoc, Wales and Médoc, Bordeaux, France and the Celtic migrations from the South East to the North West, and likely predates St. Madoc. The population was 365 in 2011.

Close by communities include Cheriton and Landimore. Nearby beaches include Broughton Bay and Whiteford Sands. It is in the community of Llangennith, Llanmadoc and Cheriton.

=== Llanmorlais ===
Llanmorlais, on the north coast, was a cockling village. The name Llanmorlais is not a true Llan place name, but a corruption of the village's old name, Glan Morlais, which refers to the banks of Morlais Stream. (The village is in Penclawdd electoral ward of Swansea.) In 2014, it was rated one of the most attractive postcode areas to live in Wales.

=== Llanrhidian ===
Llanrhidian is a north Gower estuarine village, sloping down to salt marshes. (It is in the Gower electoral ward of Swansea and the community of Llanrhidian Lower.)

The village gets its name from Saint Rhidian. Its church is dedicated to St Illtyd and St Rhidian. The present building was constructed in the 13th century, with a chancel and tower added in the 14th century. In the porch may be seen a 9th-century stone, bearing simple carvings of human figures and animals. A standing stone on the village green may be the remains of a village cross.

The village is served by an Esso filling station (including a shop, the post office is currently closed), two public houses (The Welcome to Town and The Dolphin Inn), a primary school and a community hall.

=== Murton ===
Murton is in the community of Bishopston and is also a ward for elections to Bishopston Community Council. Murton lies between Bishopston and the village of Newton.

Murton is home to Murton Methodist Church a Wesleyan Methodist Church dating back to 1828, which celebrated the centenary of its current building in 1997. Murton also hosts Murton Rovers AFC Football team.

=== Oxwich ===
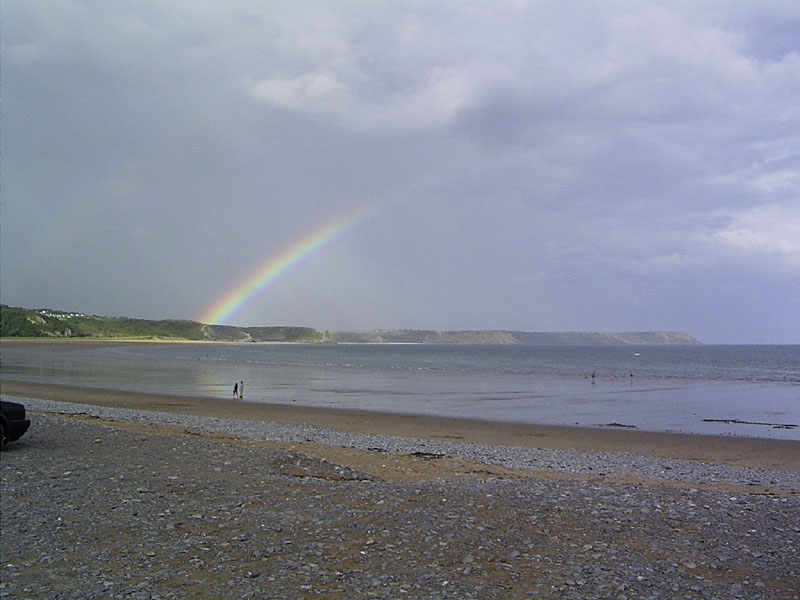
Oxwich Bay, Gower, South Wales

Oxwich is in the far south of Gower. Attractions include the Oxwich Burrows, the Tudor Oxwich Castle, Penrice Castle and Oxwich Bay. The ancient church is dedicated to Saint Illtyd. Legend has it that the stone baptismal font was placed there by the saint himself.

=== Parkmill ===
Parkmill is an inland village between Penmaen and Ilston, on the northern side of the A4118 road, the main road between Swansea and Port Eynon, in a wooded valley. It once lay within Parc le Breos, a deer park established in the 1221–32 CE by John de Braose, Marcher Lord of Gower.

=== Penclawdd ===
Penclawdd (Welsh: Pen-clawdd) is in the north of the peninsula. It is one of the larger villages in Gower. Part of the village is perched on a high location, enjoying panoramic views over the Loughor estuary and Gower country, while the main part of the village stretches along the edge of the estuary. It is plentiful in birdlife, and wild horses roam the estuary. Penclawdd is known for its local cockle industry, which goes back for many years to Roman times.

It is in Swansea's Penclawdd electoral ward.

=== Pennard ===
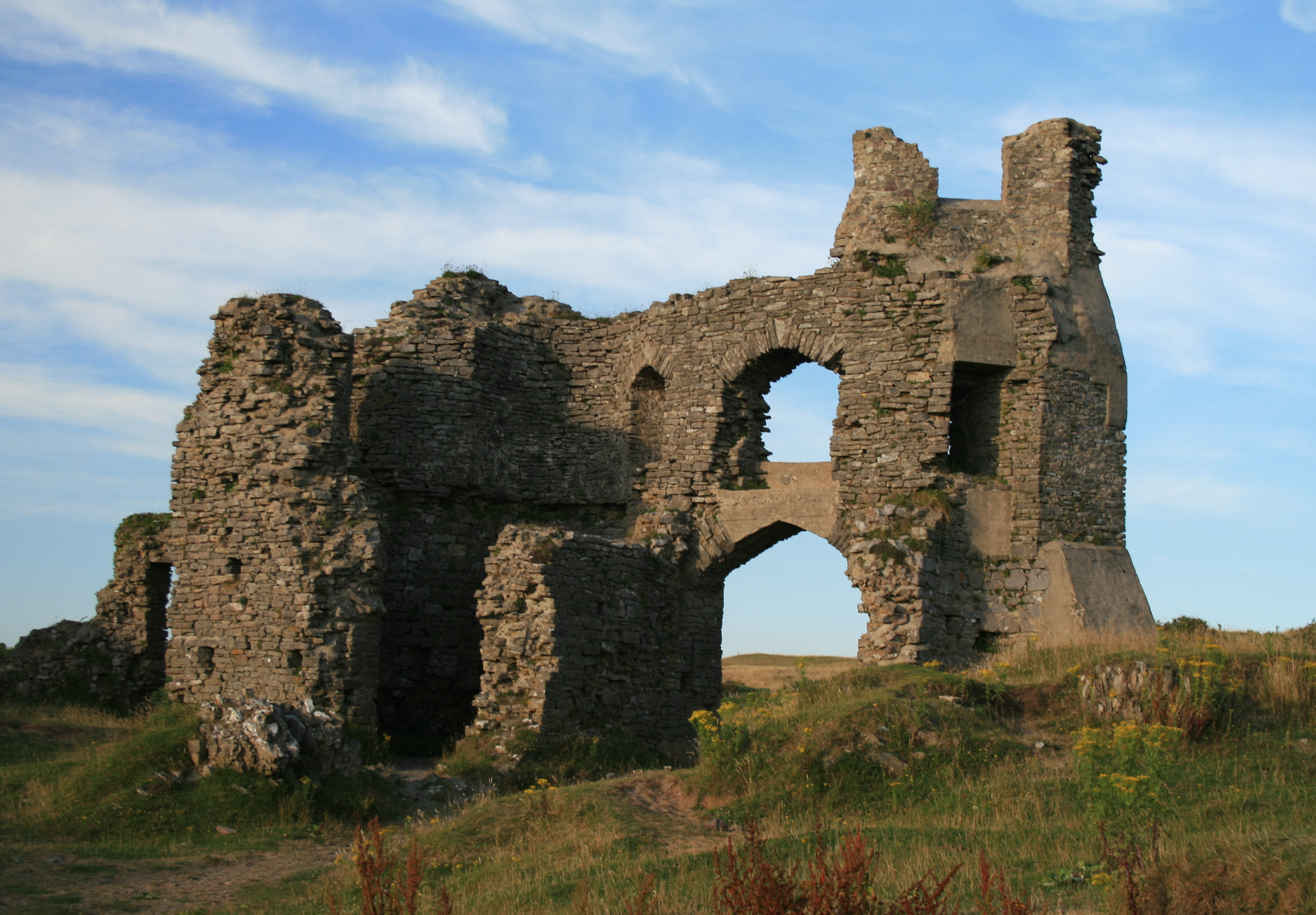
Pennard Castle, on the Gower Peninsula, South Wales

Pennard (Welsh: Llanarthbodu) is on the south of the peninsula, about 7 miles south west of Swansea city centre. It falls within the Pennard ward of Swansea. It has a church, health centre, library, a primary school and a golf course. It contains the ruins of Pennard Castle. The poets Vernon Watkins (1906–1967), Harri Webb (1920–1994) and Nigel Jenkins (1949–2014) are buried at St Mary's church.

=== Penmaen ===
Penmaen (Welsh: Pen-maen) is an inland village – a scatter of houses around the A4118 road at the foot of the slopes of Cefn Bryn. There are a number of archaeological sites in the area. It contains Parc-Le-Breos, a 19th-century hunting lodge, that was once the deer park of William de Breos, Lord of Gower, but today serves as a hotel and pony-trekking centre.

Penmaen Castle began as a small timber castle. Later it was replaced by a stone structure. Excavations in 1960 and 1961 led by Leslie Alcock found evidence that the castle was in use in the 12th and 13th centuries; the first phase was likely built by the Normans. The timber gateway was destroyed by fire and later replaced by a drystone walled gate tower. Alcock suggested that stylistically this phase of the castle may have been built by the Welsh.

Penmaen Burrows, a sandy headland west of Three Cliffs Bay, is part of the National Trust's Penrice Estate, bought with Enterprise Neptune funds in 1967. The headland had been inundated by sand, probably in the 14th century, burying the now-ruined stone church. It was excavated in 1861 and remains sunk into the sand and overgrowth.

Close to the ruined Church is a Neolithic chambered tomb, with a substantial capstone, now partly collapsed but still supported on at least 6 upright stones. Sand inundations hampered the attempts at excavation in 1861, 1882 and 1893, and still make it hard to appreciate what the original landform would have been like. It was probably on a false summit of the headland.

It is thought that the now lost village of Stedwarlango also lies buried somewhere under the Penmaen Burrows.

A pencil and watercolour painting of Penmaen Burrows was made in 1951 by John Nash.

=== Port Eynon ===
This small, south coast village, extending from Port Eynon beach to the top of a hill, has two fish and chip shops at the sea front, a youth hostel, a pub, a coffee shop and a restaurant.

To the north-west lies Overton village, with footpaths to Overton Mere, a rocky beach. Half a mile to the east of the main beach stands the village of Horton.

=== Reynoldston ===
Reynoldston is an inland village. It has its own elected community council.

It had one of the longest functioning community broadband schemes in Britain; which started in 2003 and finished at the end of 2008 following the availability of ADSL.

=== Rhossili ===
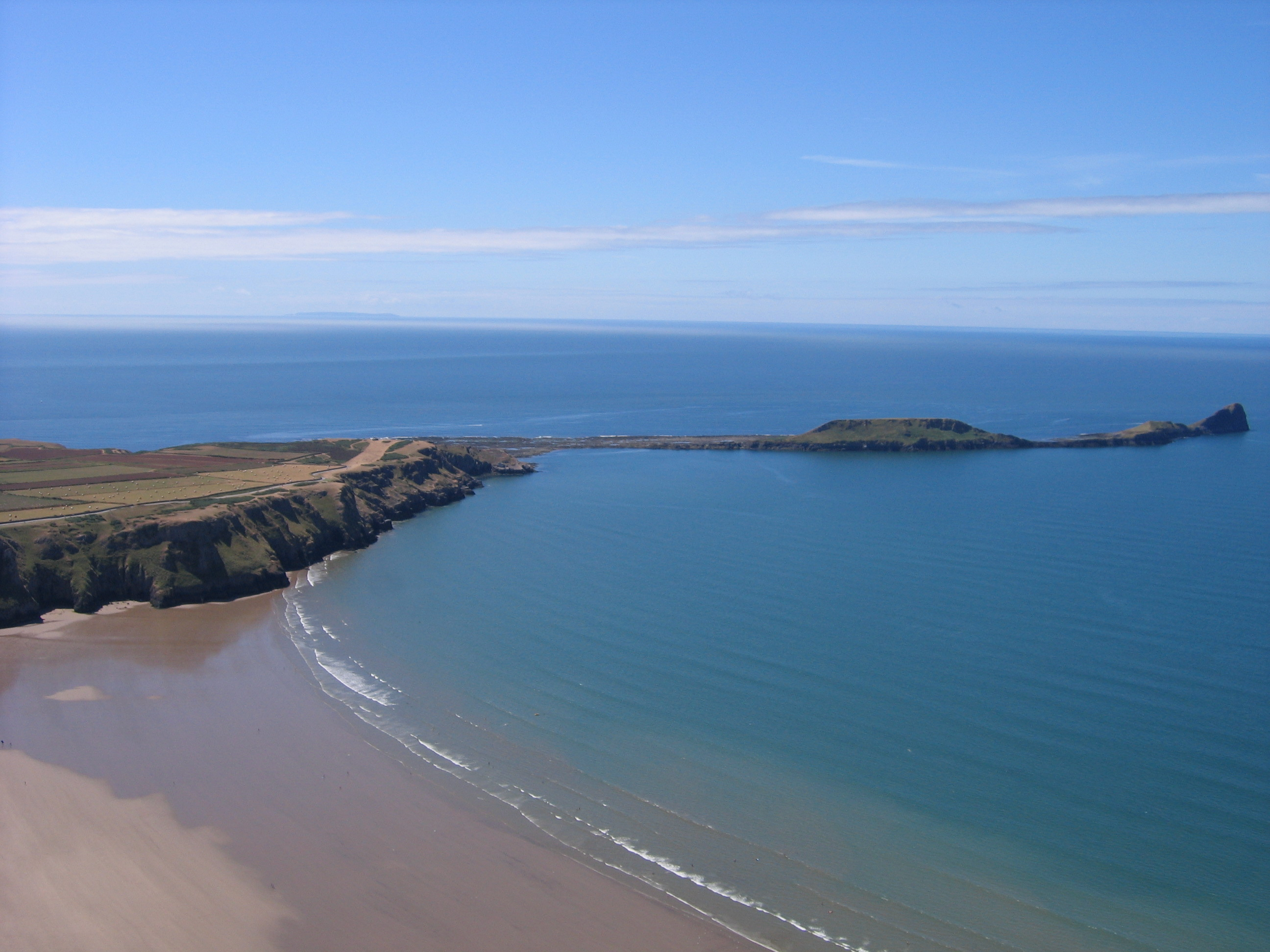
Worm's Head at Rhossili

Rhossili (Welsh: Rhosili) is on the southwestern tip of the peninsula. Since the 1970s it has fallen within the boundaries of Swansea. The village has a community council and is part of the Gower parliamentary constituency, and the Gower electoral ward.

=== Slade ===
Slade is situated near the south coast, north west of Oxwich Bay. Points of interest include Eastern Slade Farm, a dairy farm and campsite.

The nearby Slade Bay includes a small beach, and is a breeding ground for fish such as rays, dogfish, common dab and bass.

=== Three Crosses ===
Three Crosses (Welsh: Y Crwys) is an inland village at the north east of the peninsula. Situated at a crossroad on the road from Swansea city centre (10 km) to Penclawdd (5 km), it grew up in the early 19th century to serve small shallow collieries in the area. These collieries had disappeared by the early years of the 20th century, and since then Three Crosses has developed as a 'dormitory village' for Swansea. Three Crosses is home to Capel Y Crwys, a large independent chapel. The village is currently home to one village shop (Country Stores) and one public house, The Poundffald. The Joiners Arms was another public house in the village but closed permanently in 2019 due to staff shortages.

It has its own Community Council. Three Crosses community, in the City and County of Swansea, was formed in 2012 from the Three Crosses ward formerly in Llanrhidian Higher community.

=== Upper Killay ===
Upper Killay (Welsh: Cilâ Uchaf) is an inland village and community. It has its own elected community council. The Clyne Valley cycle track passes through the village. Upper Killay is a gateway to Gower from the east. It lies to the south of Dunvant. The main road through the village passes over a cattle grid to the west, which marks the start of Fairwood Common. The village has its own rugby team, Swansea Uplands RFC. Their clubhouse and playing fields are to the south of the village, on Fairwood Common. There is a primary school in Upper Killay, named Cila Primary School. The school has a nursery. There is a park next to the community centre and a village shop. Fairwood Hospital, an elderly care facility, closed in 2010. The community population was 1,331 as of the 2011 census.

Notable residents include Andrew Jones (filmmaker).

== Small settlements ==
- Burry Green is a hamlet on the junction between the north Gower road (from Swansea to Llangenith) and the road south to Port Eynon and Rhossili on the south Gower coast. The latter road forms the shortest road link between Rhossili and Llangenith. It is a little over a mile north west of Reynoldston, and is not far from the Burry Stream, which runs north into the Loughor estuary. The large village green faces the north-eastern slopes of Cefn Bryn, the second-highest point in Gower. Footpaths lead north across Ryers Down to Cheriton.
- Caswell village rises above Caswell Bay, one of the most popular bays in south Gower.51.57115°N 4.01787°W
- Horton is a south Gower village, situated just north east of Port Eynon off the A4118 road. Steep lanes descend to sea level, where there are dunes and firm sands, and where visitors may enjoy good bathing, canoeing, fishing and walking. Footpaths lead west to Port Eynon, and east to Slade Bay, Lucas Bay, Oxwich Point and Oxwich. 51°33′12.00″N 4°12′06.00″W
- Kittle is an inland village, near to Bishopston, spreading north and south of the Pennard Road. (It is in Swansea's Pennard electoral ward.) 51°35′03.00″N 4°03′35.00″W
- Knelston (Welsh: Llan-y-tair-mair) is an inland settlement on a conspicuous rise one mile south-west of Reynoldston. (It is in the Gower ward.)51°34′46.00″N 4°12′53.00″W In neighbouring fields may be found ruins of a 12th-century church of St Taurin, and three standing stones.
- Landimore is a north Gower hamlet, descending to salt marshes east of Cheriton. It is in the Gower ward between Llanmadoc and Llanrhidian. On the slopes of a hill to the west are traces of Landimore Castle (also known as Bovehill Castle).
- Langland village, near the south Gower coast, adjoins the Langland Bay beach resort. It is in the Newton and Oystermouth wards.51°34′11.00″N 4°00′12.00″W
- Llandewi or Llanddewi is an inland hamlet, on the road linking the north Gower villages of Llangenith, Llanmadoc and Llanrhidian with the south Gower villages of Port Eynon and Rhossili. It is in the Port Eynon community council area, approximately 2 miles south west of Reynoldston and 3 miles north of Rhossili. The church of St. David was built by Henry de Gower between 1328 and 1347. Its tower contains an 18th-century bell. 51°34′46.00″N 4°13′25.00″W
- Llethryd (or Llethrid) is an inland farming settlement, near the centre of Gower, around the B4271 road out of Swansea, just over halfway between Upper Killay and Llanrhidian, and on the western edge of Pengwern Common. Here the road descends steeply into a little wooded valley, through which flows the stream of Parkmill Pill. About 200 yards south of the road lies the entrance to the vast Llethryd Tooth Cave.
- Middleton lies on the south-west edge of Gower, on the outskirts of Rhossili village and not far from Rhossili Bay. It has a much-used village hall. Lanes lead south to Fall Bay and Mewslade, and north across Rhossili Down to Llangenydd.
- Nicholaston is a farming community near the south coast of Gower, on the road between Penmaen and Oxwich. It is in the Gower ward. The isolated church of St Nicolas was built in the 14th century, but was thoroughly reconstructed in 1894. Its alabaster pulpit incorporates sculptures of the 19th-century theologians Keble, Liddon and Pusey.
- Oldwalls, on the north Gower road, a little west of Llanrhidian, consists of a small number of houses and a holiday accommodation site.
- Overton in south Gower is a secluded hamlet situated 1/3 of a mile west of Port Eynon. It is in the Gower ward. Footpaths lead south to the pebbly beach of Overton Mere, and west along the cliffs to Paviland, The Knave and Rhossili.
- Oxwich Green in south Gower is a farming settlement on the road between the villages of Oxwich and Slade.
- Penrice, a hamlet in south Gower, inland from Oxwich Bay, is approachable by steep, narrow roads. On its village green – once a social centre of Gower – stands St Andrew's Church, Penrice and the stone base of a former cross. The painter Alfred Janes has a memorial in the churchyard. Penrice Park contains an 18th-century country-house and the remains of a Norman castle – both known as Penrice Castle.
- Pitton is a sheltered settlement in south-west Gower, near Rhossili, centred on Great Pitton Farm, one of the oldest farms in Gower. It is in the Gower ward. In the 18th century some villagers were involved in smuggling. Lanes lead south from Pitton Hill to the sea at Mewslade, and north across Rhossili Downs to Llangenith.
- Pilton Green consists of a few houses on the road connecting the villages of Scurlage and Rhossili.
- Scurlage in southern Gower lies at the junction of roads leading to Port Eynon or Rhossili. It has a caravan site and a sports field that is home to South Gower A.F.C. football team. Some walls of Scurlage Castle may be seen.
- Southgate is on the cliffs of south Gower, within the Pennard community of Swansea. It is near Pennard golf links. Footpaths lead to Pobbles and Three Cliffs Bay.
