= Gower (electoral ward) =

Coordinates: 51.5883°N 4.1955°W

Gower ward
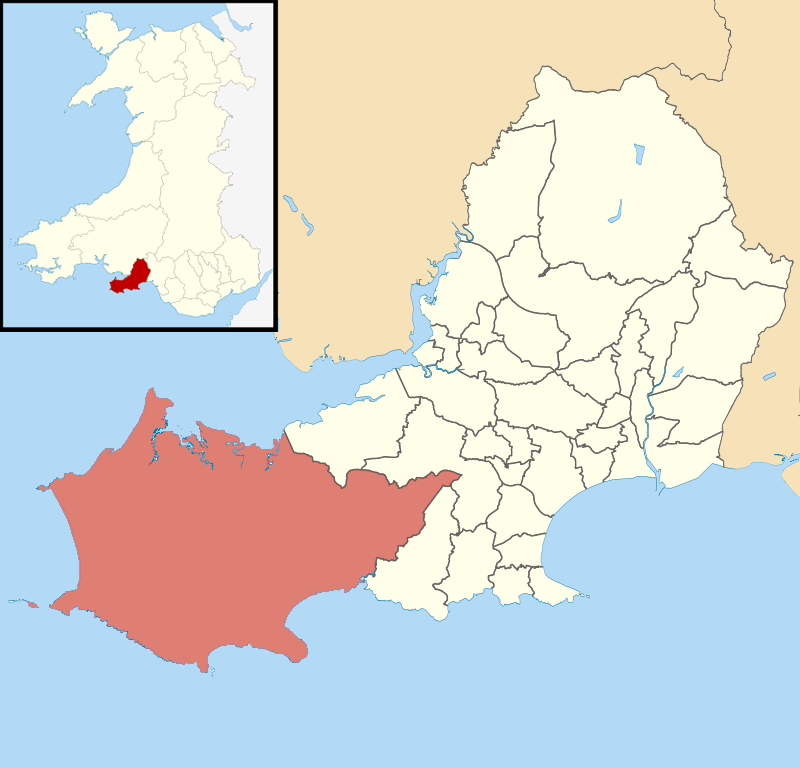
- Location of pre-2022 Gower ward within the City and County of Swansea
- Area: 113.20 km^{2} (43.71 sq mi) (2001 census)
- Population: 3,696 (2011 census)
  - Density: 33/km^{2} (85/sq mi)
- Principal area: Swansea
- Preserved county: West Glamorgan
- Country: Wales
- Sovereign state: United Kingdom
- UK Parliament: Gower
- Senedd Cymru – Welsh Parliament: Gŵyr Abertawe
- Councillors: Richard David Lewis (Liberal Democrat)

Gower (Welsh: Gŵyr) electoral ward is an electoral ward in Britain. It is a ward of the City and County of Swansea, and comprises the western part of the Gower Peninsula. It lies within the UK Parliamentary constituency of Gower.

The electoral ward consists of some or all of the following villages and areas: Cheriton, Horton, Knelston, Landimore, Llandewi, Llangennith, Llanmadoc, Llanrhidian, Middleton, Oldwalls, Overton, Oxwich Green, Oxwich, Penrice, Port Eynon, Reynoldston, Rhossili, Slade, Scurlage.

It also includes the communities of Ilston, "Llangennith, Llanmadoc and Cheriton", Llanrhidian Lower, Penrice, Swansea, Port Eynon, Reynoldston and Rhossili.

Neighbouring wards are Penclawdd to the north east, Fairwood to the east and Pennard to the south-east.

== 2022 boundary changes ==
Following recommendations by the Local Democracy and Boundary Commission for Wales the community of Ilston was transferred from the Gower ward to the Pennard ward, effective from the 2022 local elections.

== 2012 local council elections ==
Local council elections for Gower were held on 3 May 2012, along with wards in 21/22 local authorities in Wales. The turn-out for Gower was 47.51%. The results were:

Candidate	Party	Votes	Status
Richard David Lewis	Liberal Democrat	826	Liberal Democrat hold
Ray Collins	Labour	358	
Robert Fisher	Conservative	232	

== Senedd ==
Gower Ward is part of the Gŵyr Abertawe seat which returns six Member of the Senedd to the Senedd.
