= Broughton Beach =

Broughton Beach may refer to:

- Broughton Bay in Wales, UK
- Broughton Beach, a park in Portland, Oregon, US
