= Pil (placename) =

Welsh language placename element

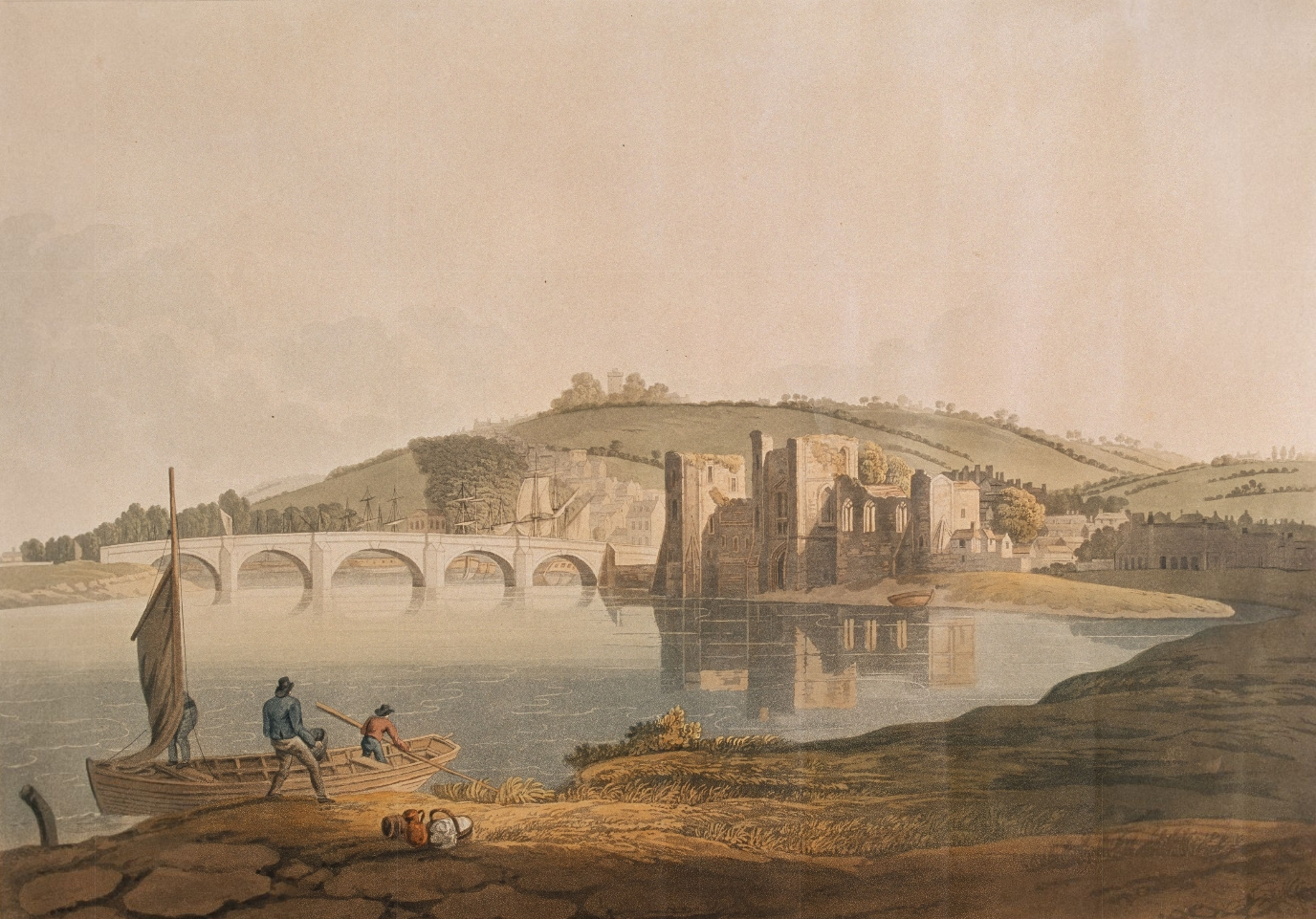
Newport in Monmouthshire (1813) by Edward Pugh, showing the castle, bridge and ships docked at Arthur's Pîl (or Town Pîl) beyond.

Pîl (also rendered as Pill, Pil or Pyll) is a Welsh placename element. The name is defined as the tidal reach of a waterway, suitable as a harbour, and is common along the Bristol Channel and Severn Estuary. The highly localised distribution suggests it may have been part of a common maritime culture on the waterways within the tidal reach of the Severn Sea.

The name is today most commonly associated with the village of Pyle in Glamorgan, and the small village of Pill in Somerset.

== Usage ==
In Welsh toponymy and hydronymy the word is often mistaken for another word "pwll" ("pool"). However, there is no proven link between the words and the two are often found within the same localities (Caerleon has both a Pwll Mawr and a Pîl Mawr either side of the Roman port). It is thought that Pîl developed a secondary meaning of 'refuge', as the name also appears in more inland areas (such as Pilleth in Powys).

== Proliferation ==
Instances of the name are found as far north as Pilling in Lancashire and as far south as South Pill and Pillmere in Saltash, Cornwall. However, the name is most associated with the Severn Sea, from Pembrokeshire in the west to Somerset and Gloucestershire in the east. Robert Macfarlane interpreted the word as denoting "a tidal creek or stream...capable of holding small barges", while Rick Turner noted the word was part of a common lexicon, shared across the Gwent, Somerset and Gloucestershire Levels.

== History ==
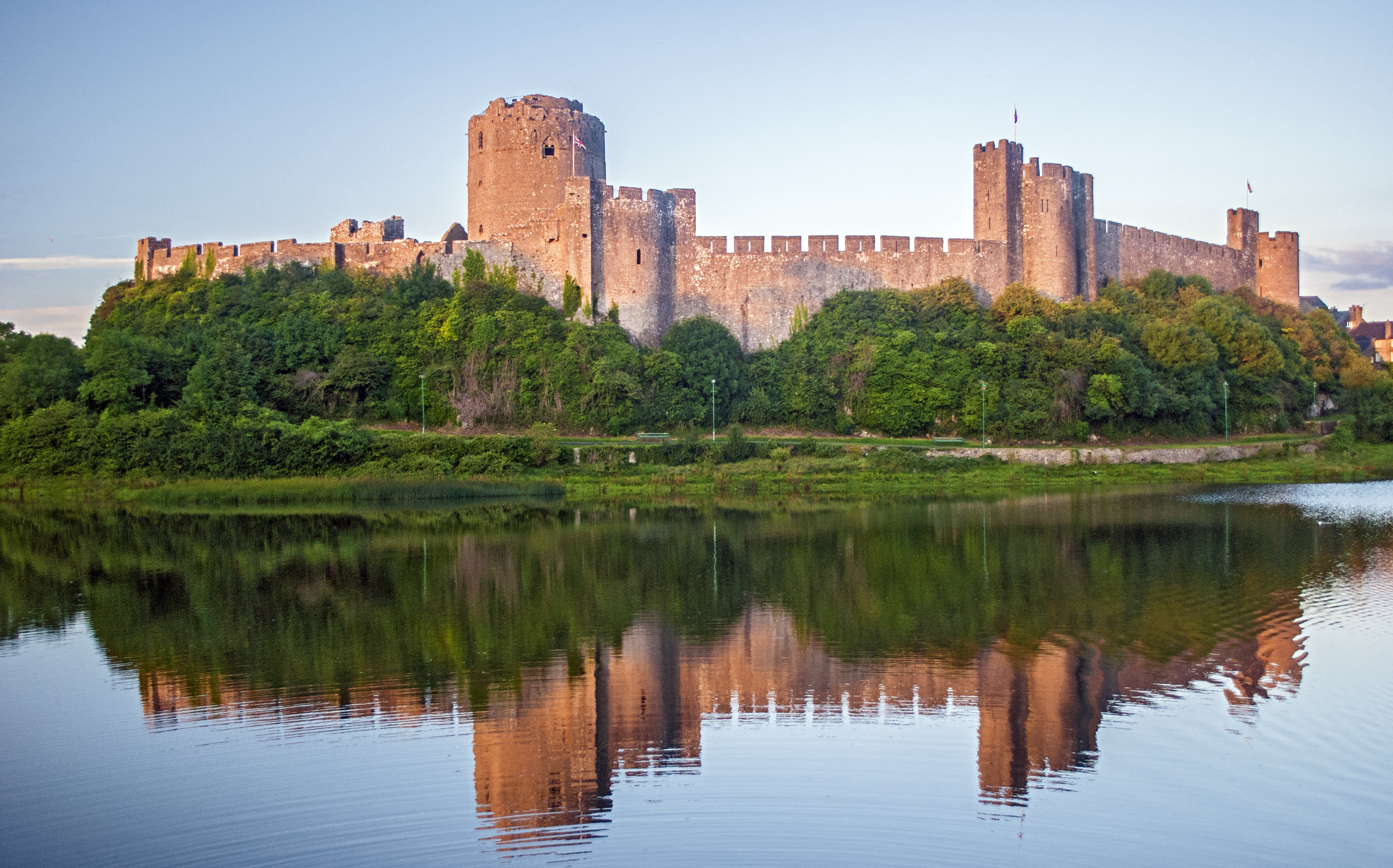
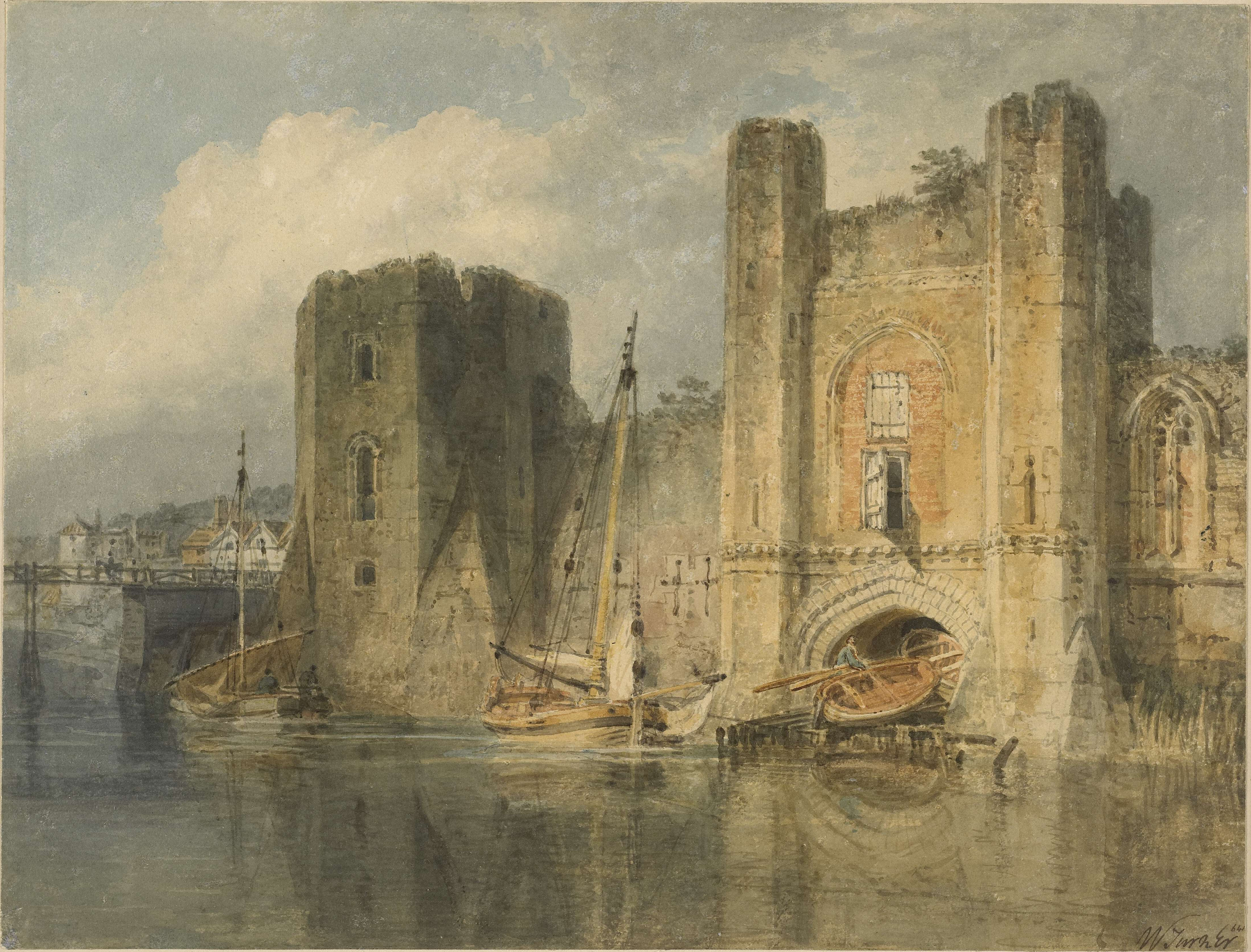
The Norman castles at Pembroke (left) and Newport (right) were built adjacent to pîls and both settlements would develop through their maritime trade.

The prevalence of this element indicates its significance in the development of medieval communities along the Severn. This is perhaps most evident on the River Usk, where Pîls were located both at the old Roman port of Caerleon and at the new Norman castle further south. The city of Newport would develop around a number of Pîls, such as Gwynllyw's Pîl (said to have been the base of piracy by Gwynllyw, the future patron saint of Newport and Newport Cathedral), Arthur's Pîl (or Town Pîl), the site of the 2002 archaeological discovery of the Newport ship (now the Riverfront Arts Centre) and Jack's Pîl.

The word was defined in the Archæologia Britannica, a 1707 work by the Welsh linguist Edward Lhuyd. Nineteenth century Welsh writers would often define the term in line with William Owen Pughe's 1803 definition as "a small inlet of the sea filled by the tide". Many of these writers would point out its contemporary status as a colloquial or oral term still in use throughout the south of Wales. Pughe also noted the rarity of the term in other parts of Wales, stating that Camlas was often used for similar places in north Wales.

== List of place names with the element ==
=== Bristol ===
- Broad Pill, Shirehampton
- Elbury Pill, Avonmouth (No longer extant)
- Morgans Pill
- New Pill
- Stup Pill Rhine
- Wimpenny Pill

=== Carmarthenshire ===
- Main Pill
- Railsgate Pill
- Pil Dafen, a tidal stream in the National Wetlands Centre at Llanelli

=== Ceredigion ===
- Pil Lodge

=== Cheshire ===
- Dawpool

=== Cornwall ===
- Bodmin Pill, River Fowey
- Caffamill Pill, River Fowey
- Cliff Pill, River Fowey
- Frenchman's Pill, Helford River
- Manely Pill, River Lerryn
- Mendy Pill, River Lerryn
- Mixtow Pill, River Fowey
- Pill Cove, Helford Passage
- Pill Creek, River Fal
- Pill Farm, Lostwithiel, River Fowey
- Pont Pill, River Fowey
- South Pill, Saltash
- Terras Pill Bridge, also known as Terras Bridge, Sandplace.
- Wooda Pill, River Lerryn
- Woodgate Pill, River Fowey

=== Devon ===
- Pilton

=== Glamorgan ===
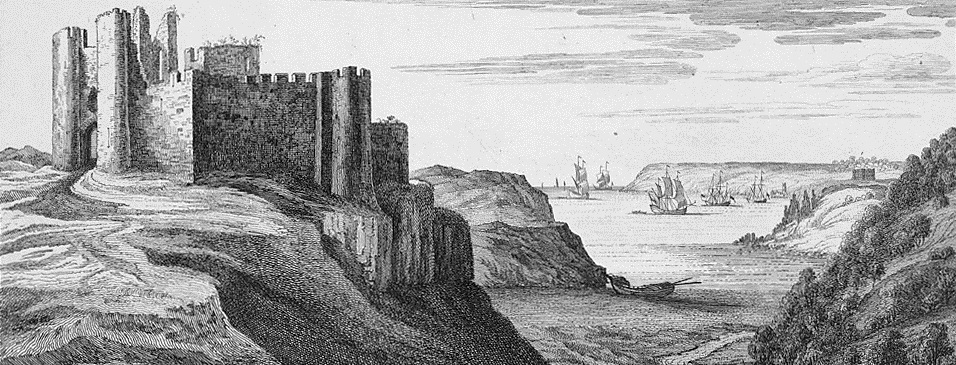
A sketch of Pennard Castle in 1741, showing numerous ships in Pennard pill.

- Blackpill, Swansea
- Burry Pill, Gower
- Cogan Pill, Penarth (no longer extant)
- Court Sart Pill, Neath
- Giant's Grave Pill, Neath
- Great Pill
- Jones' Pill, a Pil "on the shore of Portmanmoor", East Moors, Cardiff (no longer extant).
- Melincryddan Pill, Neath
- Nicholaston Pill, Gower
- Pen y Pil, a school and area above the Pil-du-Reen
- Pennard Pill, a watercourse at Three Cliffs Bay
- Pil-du-Reen, a waterway in Trowbridge, Cardiff
- Pilgot-Fawr, on the river Ely, in the Penarth Road area of Grangetown (near the point where Stadium Close meets Penarth Road today, no longer extant).
- Pil y Cynffig
- Pill, the name of a farm in Rumney, near the Severn shore.
- Pwll-Mawr, an area of Rumney, Cardiff. It is first recorded as "the Great Pill" In a charter of 1218, and is named for a Pill at the mouth of the Rhymney estuary.
- Pyle
- Red Jacket Pill, now a Lake on the Neath and Tennant Canal

=== Gloucestershire ===
- Berkeley Pill
- Brims Pill, Newnham
- Bullo Pill, Newnham
- Cake Pill
- Chestle Pill
- Conigre Pill
- Hill Pill
- Pilning
- The Pill, a Waterway running through the village of Pilning and the Pilning Wetlands
- Waldings Pill

=== Gwent ===
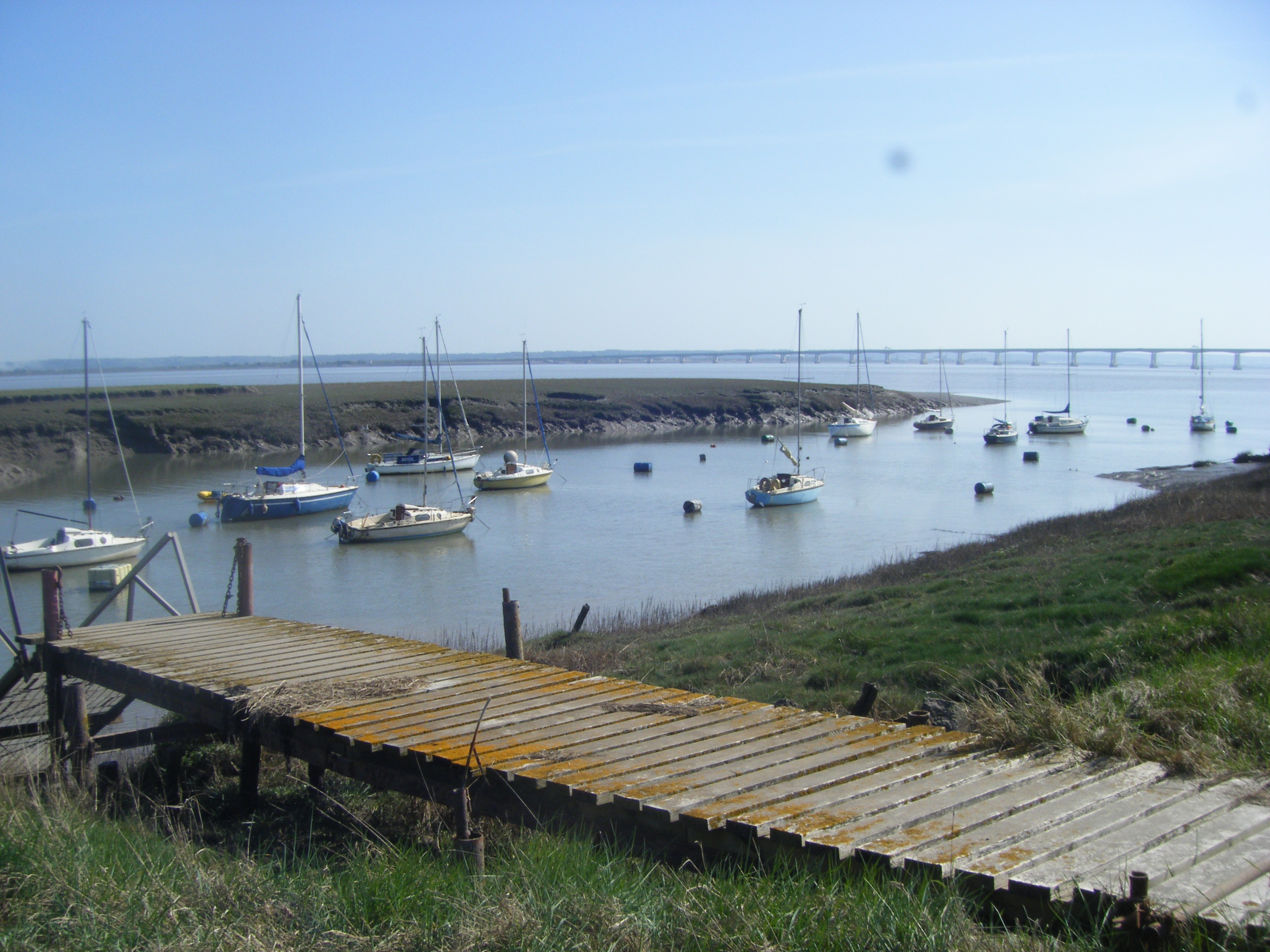
St. Pierre Pill was the site of a much larger harbour associated with legends of St Tewdric. It remains in use today as the Chepstow and District Yacht Club.

- Arthur's Pill or Town Pill, Newport (no longer extant)
- Caldicot Pill (south of a road named The Pill, Portskewett)
- Chapel Pill
- Collister Pill Reen
- Crindau Pill
- Elver Pill
- Goldcliff Pill
- Jack's Pill, Newport
- Julians Pill, the inlet at the Newport Uskmouth Sailing Club
- Liswerry Pill Reen
- Maes-glas Pill
- Magor Pill (also a street and farm between Magor Pill and the town of Magor)
- Mathern Pill
- Mireland Pill Reen
- Pillgwenlly, Newport (The Pil itself is no longer extant).
- Pillmawr, West of Caerleon, also the name of a village.
- Pillbach, between Pillmawr and the port at Caerleon, on the northern bank of the Usk.
- Park Pill, west of Pillmawr.
- Peterstone Pill
- St. Pierre Pill
- Small Pill, Peterstone Wentlooge
- Spytty Pill, Newport
- Towyn Pill Reen
- Tynypil, Peterstone Wentlooge
- Undy Pill
- West Pill Reen

=== Lancashire ===
- Pilling
- Skippool

=== Merseyside ===
- Berket Poole
- Bromborough Pool
- Wallasey Pool

=== Pembrokeshire ===
- Castle Pill, near Milford Haven, which gives its name to Pill Road.
- Cosheston Pill, Pembroke Dock
- Edward's Pill
- Ford Pill
- Garon Pill, Lawrenny
- Goldborough Pill
- Hubberston Pill, the waterway separating Milford Haven and Hakin, from which Pill Priory is named.
- Jacob's Pill
- Kingswood Pill
- Layers Pill
- Llangwm Ferry Pill
- Llangwm Pill,
- Millin Pill
- Minwear Pill (opposite Slebech Hall on the Eastern Cleddau)
- Monkton Pill, Pembroke
- Pennar Mouth Pill, Pembroke
- Pill Fort
- Pill Priory
- Pill Susan
- Quoits Water Pill, Pembroke
- Radford Pill
- Sprinkle Pill
- Westfield Pill, Neyland.
- West Llanion Pill, Pembroke Dock

=== Somerset ===
- Chapel Pill (no longer extant)
- Combwich Pill
- Huntspill
- Huntspill River
- Kilve Pill
- Kingston Pill
- Pill, Somerset
- Pill Bridge, Ilchester
- Pill Copse, a wood in Blue Anchor named for the Pill River
- Pill River, Chapel Cleeve
- Pilton, Somerset
- Pims Pill Reach
- Portishead Pill (no longer extant)
- Pylle
- Stroud Pill
- Uphill

== See also ==
- Celtic onomastics
- Celtic toponymy
- List of generic forms in place names in the United Kingdom and Ireland
- Toponymy in Great Britain
- Welsh place names in other countries
- Welsh toponymy
