= Slade Bay =

Bay on the Gower Peninsula, Wales

Coordinates: 51.54756°N 4.1827°W

Slade Bay - marked on Ordnance Survey maps as "The Sands" - is a sandy beach near the village of Slade, on the Gower Peninsula in South West Wales. It is set in a relatively inaccessible location - being reachable only on foot and climbing over some large rocks. At the back of the beach, worked fields and steep gorse-clad cliffs are visible.
