= Pill Fort =

Coordinates: 51.708709°N 5.022629°W

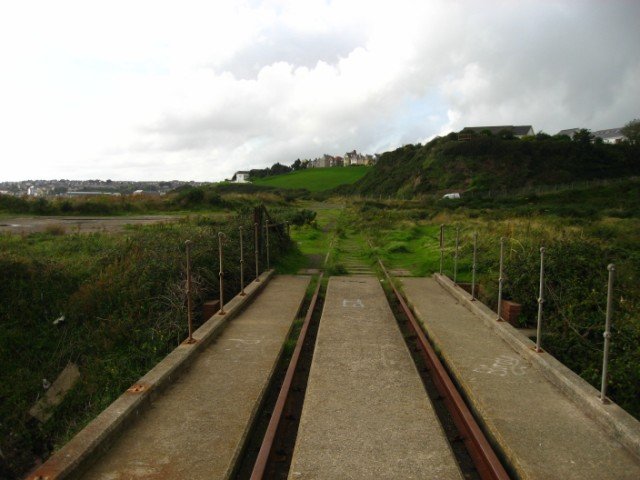
Site of the fort, the earthen embankment clearly visible to the right of the picture

Pill Fort was a sconce fort located on the northern shore of Milford Haven, Pembrokeshire. It was built by Royalist forces in order to prevent Parliamentarian forces landing at Pembroke Castle, and to protect Royalist forces landing from Ireland.

The site was chosen on the west side of the eastern inlet surrounding the site of the later town, known as a Pill. Construction was according to a plan by Richard Steel, an engineer from the King's headquarters in Oxford. It was built on raised headland at the junction of the Pill and the waterway, and at a cost of £400. Known locally as the Gunkle, it may have been the site of an Iron Age fort. It was the only fort built during the Civil War in Pembrokeshire. Although there is no definite description of the fort, similar structures consisted of four earthen bastions surrounded by a ditch. The walls were of palisade, and the canons sat on the bastions. Accommodation and catering facilities were contained in tented constructions in the middle of the enclosure. The bell tower at Steyton church was used as an observation post and musket tower.

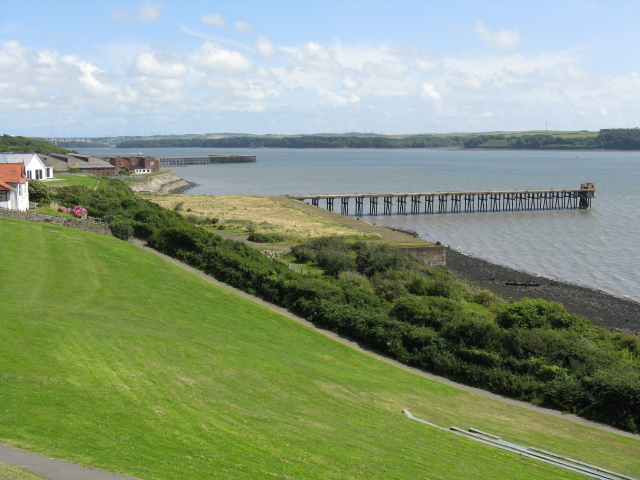
Site of the fort, to the left of the picture, overlooking the Haven estuary

On 23 February 1644 a Parliamentary force of three ships arrived in the Haven, and Colonel Rowland Laugharne assumed command of all forces at Pembroke. Two Royalist ships took shelter in the Pill. Parliamentary forces moved canons into position on the eastern side of the Pill in addition to those on ships in the Haven, and a bombardment of the fort began. Land forces arrive from the north of the fort via Steynton, and a truce was called and the fort surrendered. It was manned by Parliamentarian forces for the remainder of the conflict, and dismantled prior to the outbreak of the Second Civil War in 1648. The earth embankments were noticeable until at least the 1930s, but in 1990 the area was bulldozed and is now built over.
