= Rhidian =

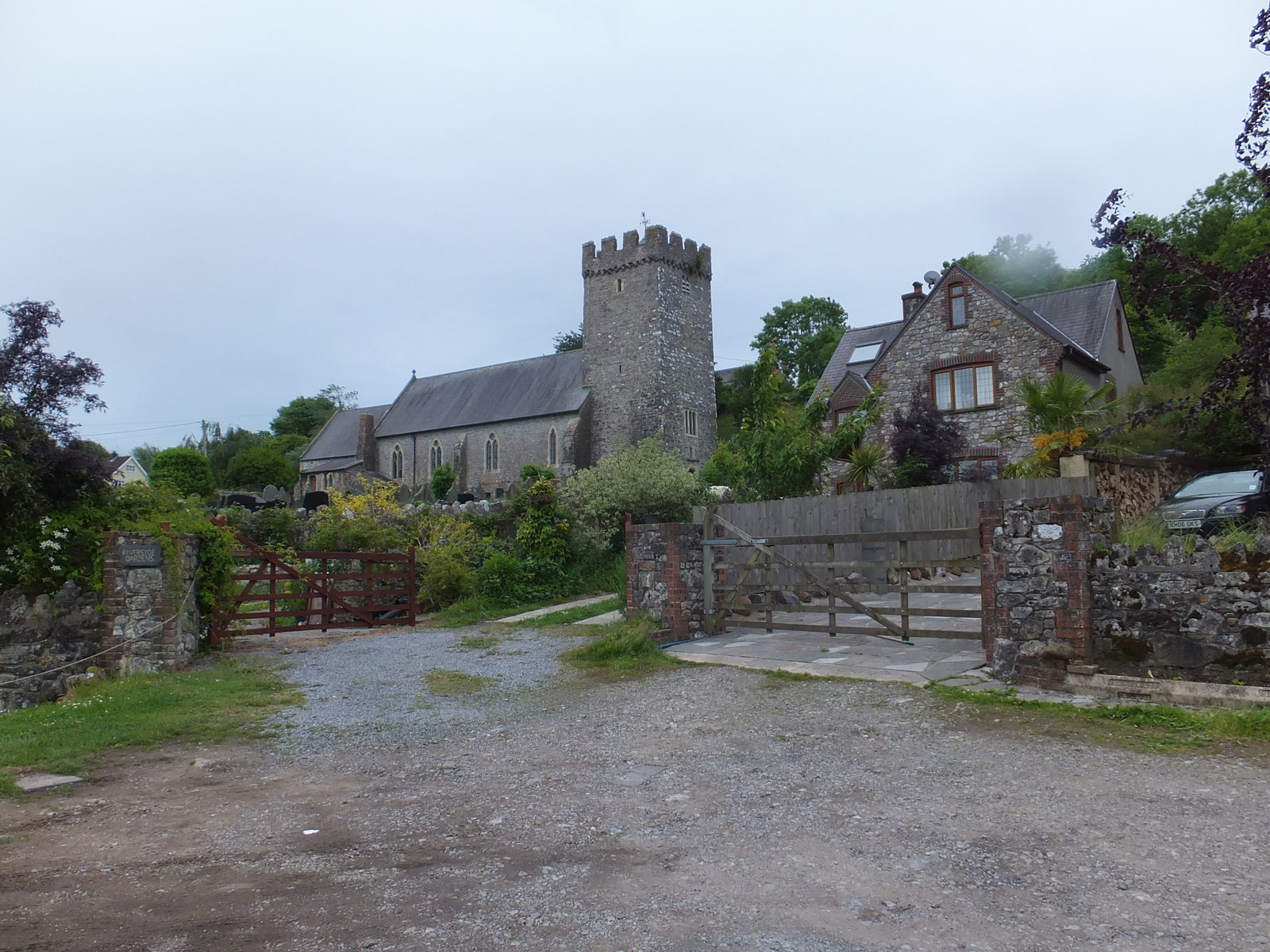
Llanrhidian church and cottages

Rhidian was a 6th-century Welsh Pre-congregational Saint who is often associated with St Illtyd.

Rhydian might be a corruption of 'Tryrulhid’, who was St Illtyd's wife. However, there are also legends about a male Celtic monk, by this name, who went on pilgrimage to St Davids.

Rhidian is the patron saint of Llanrhidian in Wales.
