= Project Neptune (National Trust) =

Project of the National Trust relating to British coastlines

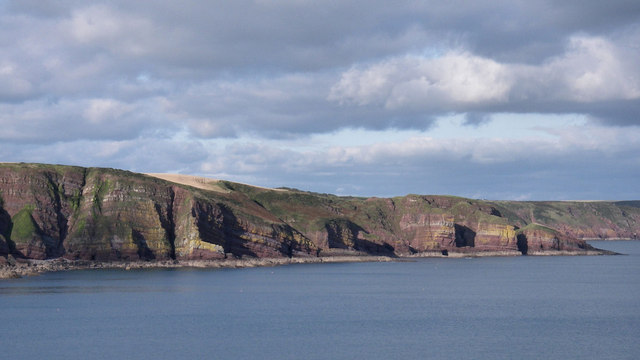
Greenala Point, Pembrokeshire; the cliffs and coastal slopes have been purchased by the National Trust as part of 'Project Neptune'

Project Neptune, also known as Enterprise Neptune, is a long-term project of the National Trust to acquire or put under covenant a substantial part of the Welsh, English and Northern Irish coastline. In 1999 it was relaunched as the Neptune Coastline Campaign. It is named for the Roman god of the sea.

== History ==
The Project began in May 1965 with the acquisition of Whiteford Burrows in the Gower Peninsula. The aim was to protect the coastline from being developed or industrialised.

By 1973 the project had reached its original £2 million fundraising target and looked after 338 miles (544 km) of coastline. It had its £1 million bid for Land's End turned down in 1981. By 1986 the National Trust had raised £8.75 million through Project Neptune.

The Project looked after 710 miles (1,140 km) of British coastline by 2009. At that time, it was focussed on the maintenance of the coastline that it already owned, particularly with regard to coastal management.

By its 50th anniversary in May 2015 the Trust had acquired 574 miles (924 km) of coastline through the project, bringing its total holding to 775 miles (1,247 km). For the anniversary, John Cooper Clarke contributed the opening verses of a poem; members of the public were asked to complete the poem.

Later in 2015, the area owned by the project increased to 780 miles (1,260 km), some 10% of the total UK coastline, covering an area of 48,800 hectares (121,000 acres).

== Extent and landmarks ==
The Project owns some of the UK's most iconic coast, including land near the Giant's Causeway in Northern Ireland, 5.5 miles (8.9 km) of the White Cliffs of Dover and The Needles.

It includes four World Heritage Sites and nine lighthouses.

=== Acquisitions ===
Year added	Location	Notes
1965	Whiteford Burrows, Swansea	
1975	The Needles, Isle of Wight	
1980s	Studland Bay, Dorset	
1990	Souter Lighthouse, Sunderland	
2005	Wembury, Devon	
2012	The White Cliffs of Dover, Kent	1-mile stretch acquisition
2015	The Great Orme, Conwy	
2017	The White Cliffs of Dover, Kent	700,000 square metres (170 acres)
2020	Sandilands, Lincolnshire	
2023	Tintagel, Cornwall	
2025	Purbeck, Dorset	
