= Llanmadoc Hill =

Highest point
- Elevation: 186 m (610 ft)
- Prominence: 103 m (338 ft)
- Listing: HuMP
- Coordinates: 51.6087°N 4.2681°W

Naming
- Language of name: Welsh

Geography
- Location: Swansea, Wales
- OS grid: SS 430924
- Topo map: OS Landranger 159 / Explorer 164

Llanmadoc Hill is a 186-metre-high hill at the northwestern corner of the Gower Peninsula west of Swansea in South Wales. The summit at the western end of the east–west aligned ridge is crowned by a trig point; at its eastern end are a series of complex earthworks known as The Bulwark. Numerous other prehistoric cairns adorn the hill's broad summit ridge. The hill's position above the village of Llanmadoc within 2 km of Gower's northwest coast enables wide panoramas to be enjoyed over the western end of the peninsula and the surrounding Loughor estuary, Rhossili Bay and Carmarthen Bay.

== Geology ==
The hill is formed from an anticlinal east–west ridge of Old Red Sandstone, the core of which is the hard sandstone of the Lower Old Red Sandstone Brownstones Formation and the northern and southern flanks of which are the overlying quartz conglomerates of the Upper Old Red Sandstone. The lower flanks of the hill are mantled by glacial till.

== Access ==
Almost the entire hill is mapped as open country under the Countryside and Rights of Way Act 2000 thus providing relatively unfettered access on foot for members of the public. There is in addition a very dense network of public footpaths and bridleways criss-crossing the hill and linking to the minor roads which surround the hill on all sides. The National Trust own and manage the eastern ridge above the village of Cheriton up to The Bulwark.
