= Mewslade Bay =

Bay in Wales

Coordinates: 51.559°N 4.282°W

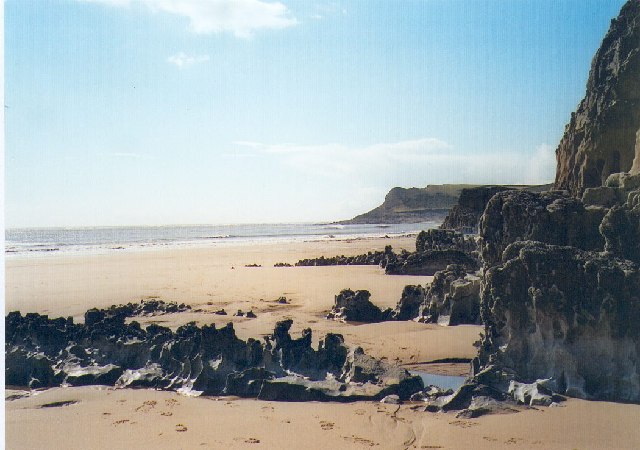
Mewslade Bay

Mewslade Bay is a small sandy beach facing SSW in the west of the Gower Peninsula, Wales. It lies south of Middleton and southwest of Pitton, from which footpaths lead to the beach.

At low tide the beach is joined to the smaller Fall Bay to the west. Thurba Head is at the east end of the beach, and beyond it the small rocky Butterslade beach.

The beach is popular with surfers, but is almost completely submerged at high tide. The main access is a fairly rocky, partly wooded path which is often muddy in places.
