= Capel Y Crwys =

Chapel in Three Crosses, Swansea, Wales

Coordinates: 51.627°N 4.065°W

Capel y Crwys

Capel y Crwys is an Independent chapel located on the Gower Peninsula in the village of Three Crosses, Swansea. It is the largest chapel on the Gower earning itself the colloquial name of Gower's "Cathedral". With a history of over two centuries it continues today with a popular membership and involvement in the local community. The chapel is a member of the Union of Welsh Independents

== History ==
The first chapel was built on the site in 1788 and it was rebuilt in 1831. The current chapel building was built in 1877 to the design of John Humphrey, and extended in 1912. The chapel is a Grade II listed building. The village of Three Crosses has a history of nonconformism dating back to 1689.

Originally a Welsh language chapel, it gradually became predominantly English-speaking.

== Organ ==
The chapel houses a 1911 Blackett & Howden pipe organ.
