= Broughton Bay =

Beach in Wales

Coordinates: 51.61357°N 4.28483°W

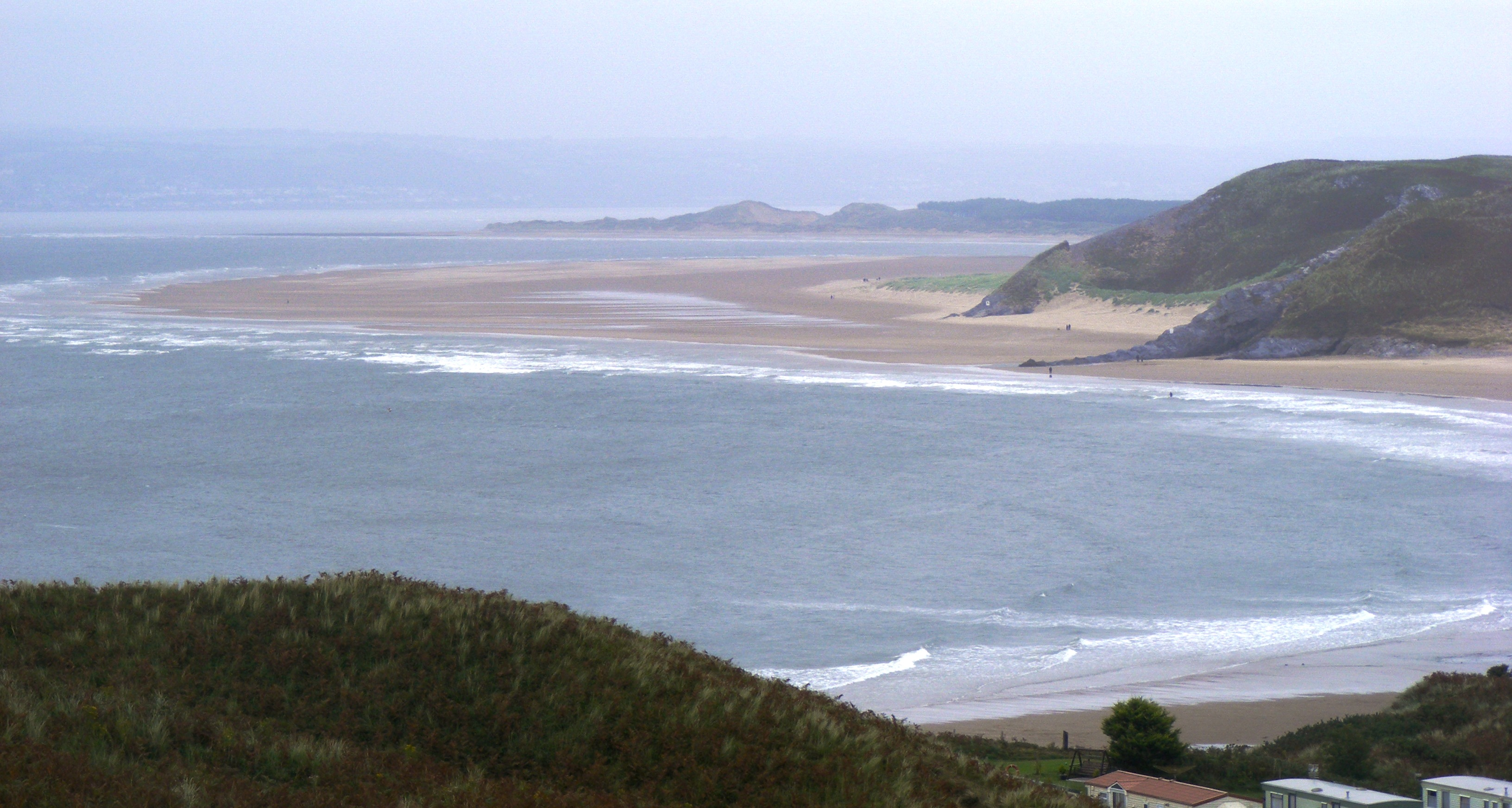
Broughton Bay

Broughton Bay is a beach of the Gower Peninsula, South Wales, located at the north western tip. The bay is backed by sand dunes further inland. Access to the adjacent Whiteford Sands beach to the west is only available at low tide.

The bay is not suitable for swimming or other water sports due to its proximity to the Loughor estuary. The waters experience very strong currents from the Loughor estuary with powerful waves, high tides and shifting sand banks. When a strong south westerly wind is blowing, dedicated windsurfers can be seen on the waters near the bay.

Nearby villages include Llangenith, Llanmadoc and slightly further is Llanrhidian. These villages are located near the access points to the beach via short lanes. There are caravan parks at each end of the bay, but the beach tends to remain quiet even during summertime, partially because there is no life guard on duty.
