= Llangennith =

Village in Wales

Coordinates: 51.601°N 4.273°W

Llangennith: Welsh: Llangenydd/Llangynydd
- Location within Swansea
- OS grid reference: SS4291
- Community: Llangennith, Llanmadoc and Cheriton
- Principal area: Swansea
- Preserved county: West Glamorgan
- Country: Wales
- Sovereign state: United Kingdom
- Post town: SWANSEA
- Postcode district: SA3
- Dialling code: 01792
- Police: South Wales
- Fire: Mid and West Wales
- Ambulance: Welsh
- UK Parliament: Gŵyr Abertawe
- Senedd Cymru – Welsh Parliament: Gower

Llangennith (Welsh: Llangenydd/Llangynydd) is a village in the City and County of Swansea, South Wales. It is located in the Gower. Moor Lane leads westwards to a caravan park near Rhossili Bay and Burrows Lane leads northwards to a caravan park overlooking Broughton Bay. The village has a scattering of houses, centred on St Cenydd's church, and the King's Head pub.

== History ==
Llangennith clusters around a central village green and the church of Saint Cenydd (also Kyned/Cynydd) - the largest in Gower - which was founded in the 6th century, in the days of the undivided Church. According to legend, the church was established as a hermitage by St Cenydd; but in 986 the early buildings were destroyed by Vikings.

The present structure dates from the 12th century - it was consecrated in 1102 - when Norman war-lords were building castles and churches all over Gower, as elsewhere in Britain. The large fortified square tower is unusually placed north of the nave in which is a filled in, low, eastern arch, likely associated with a small priory which was attached through the Middle Ages. The church is the reputed burial place of Iestyn ap Gwrgant, the last ruler of the Welsh kingdom of Morgannwg, who is said to have become a religious at Llangennith after being deposed by the Norman Robert Fitzhamon in 1090. The church contains the mutilated effigy of a 13th-century knight known locally as 'the Dolly Mare' and believed to represent a member of the de la Mere family who held lands nearby and a significant Norman font. The church interior was restored and remodelled in the 1880s, and the interior floor raised by several feet to counteract damp. The remodelling was relatively restrained and the church retains many original features.

A recently rediscovered mediæval niche in the chancel arch displays a significant carved slab of around the 9th century, featuring intricate Celtic knots. This is legendarily the former gravestone of St Cenydd and, until the nineteenth-century remodelling, was set flat in the chancel floor.

On the village green opposite the church gates is the reinforced mouth of a natural spring, St Cenydd's Well, on the upper capstone of which are carved faint traces of a cross.

A short stroll south of the church is the ruined medieval village of Coety Green.

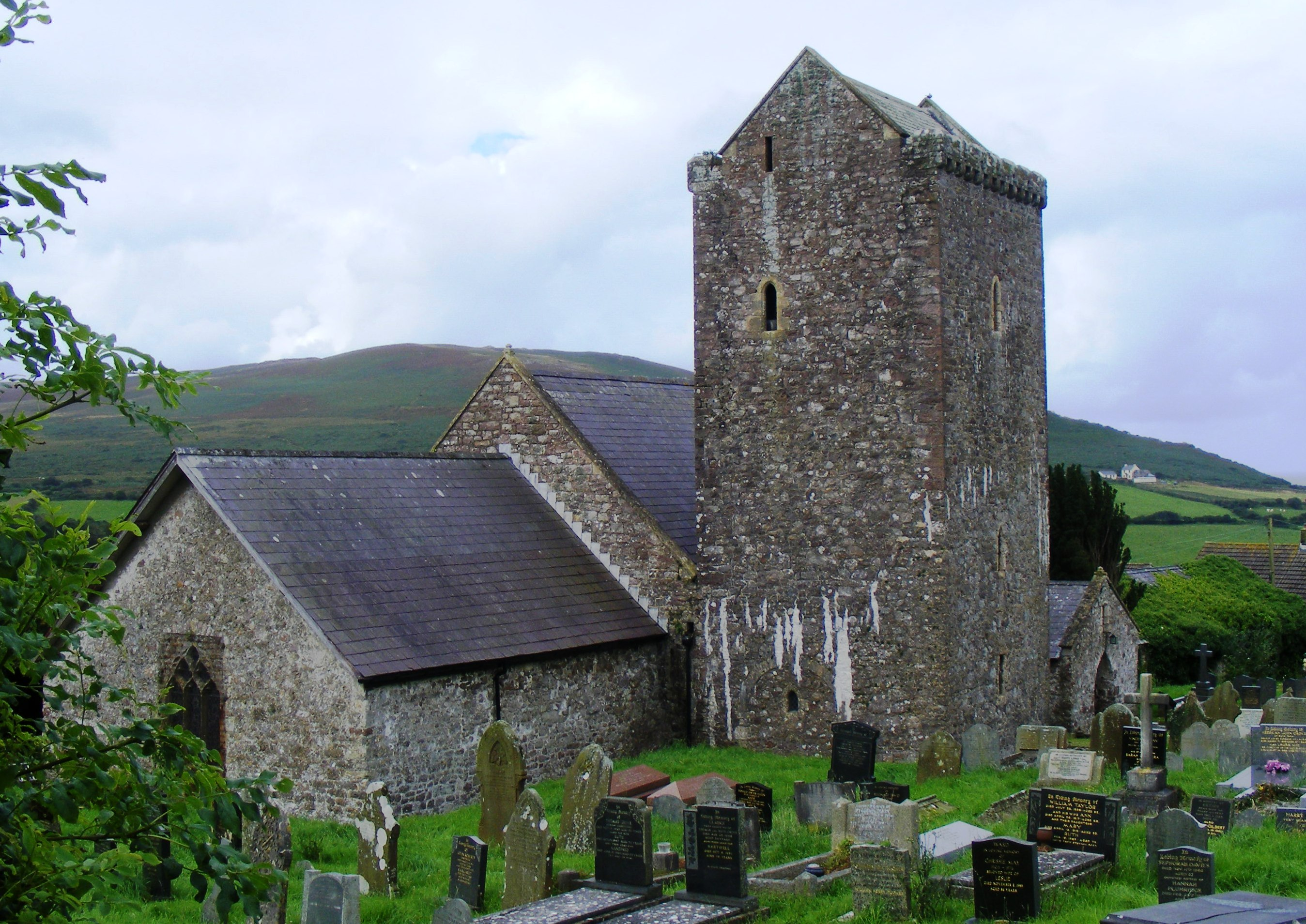
St. Cenydd's Church

Llangennith was at one time the most infamous, rough-and-ready village on the peninsula, its villagers referred to in Gower dialect as 'Llangenny Oxen', always the first to rush to any shipwreck, particularly those in Rhossili Bay, and feuding with neighbouring villagers over any plunder they could find.

During World War I, when the British government introduced daylight saving, the villagers held a public meeting - and graciously voted to fall in line for a trial period of one month.

In the churchyard are buried the Gower folk-singer, Phil Tanner, who died in 1950; and Anthony Eyre DFC (1918–1946).

== Physical features ==
The beach is now mainly a centre for surfers and forms the north half of Rhossili Bay beach; the bay stretches for over three miles. Llangennith is a popular surfing location mainly because of consistent swells that accumulate in passage over the Atlantic Ocean. Several surfing schools exist providing lessons during the summer.

The beach is backed by sand dunes, and at the north end is the island of Burry Holms. There are gentle walks north-west to the coast over the sand dunes of Llangennith and Broughton Burrows. Sights to watch out for include Blue Pool, a rock pool which, in the right sea and sky conditions, takes a deep blue colour; the natural archway called Three Chimneys.

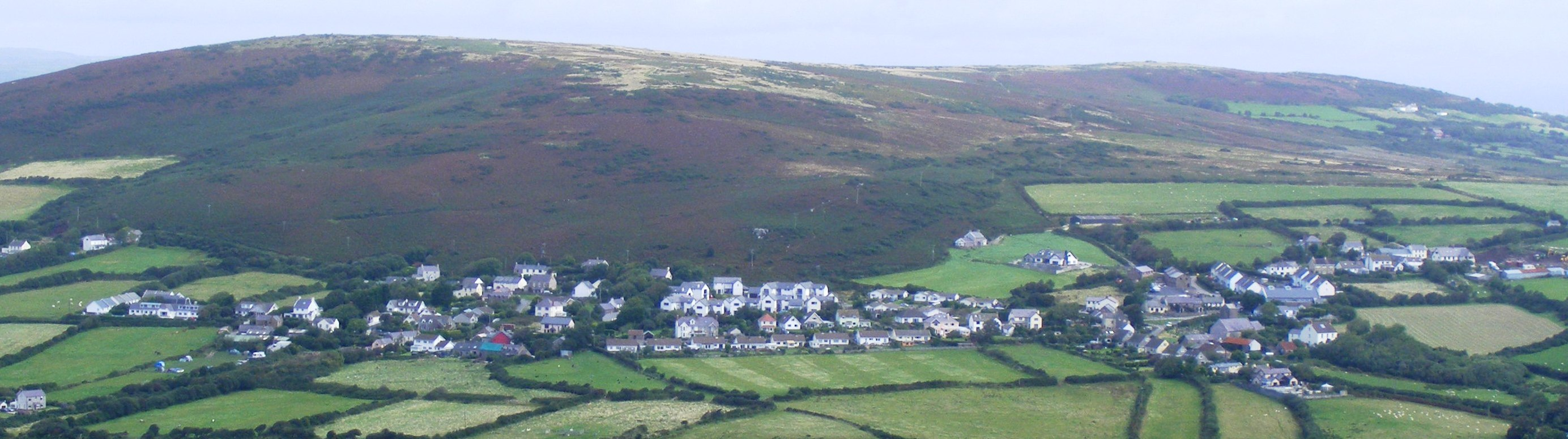
Llangennith taken from Rhossili Down

== Notable residents ==
- Cenydd - saint
- Tracy Edwards - yachtswoman
- Ryan Jones - Wales Rugby International
- Phil Tanner (1862–1950) 'The Gower Nightingale', folk singer
- Euros Lyn - Television director
