= Three Cliffs Bay =

Bay on the Gower Peninsula, Wales

Coordinates: 51.56856°N 4.11516°W

Three Cliffs Bay: Welsh: Bae y Tri Chlogwyn
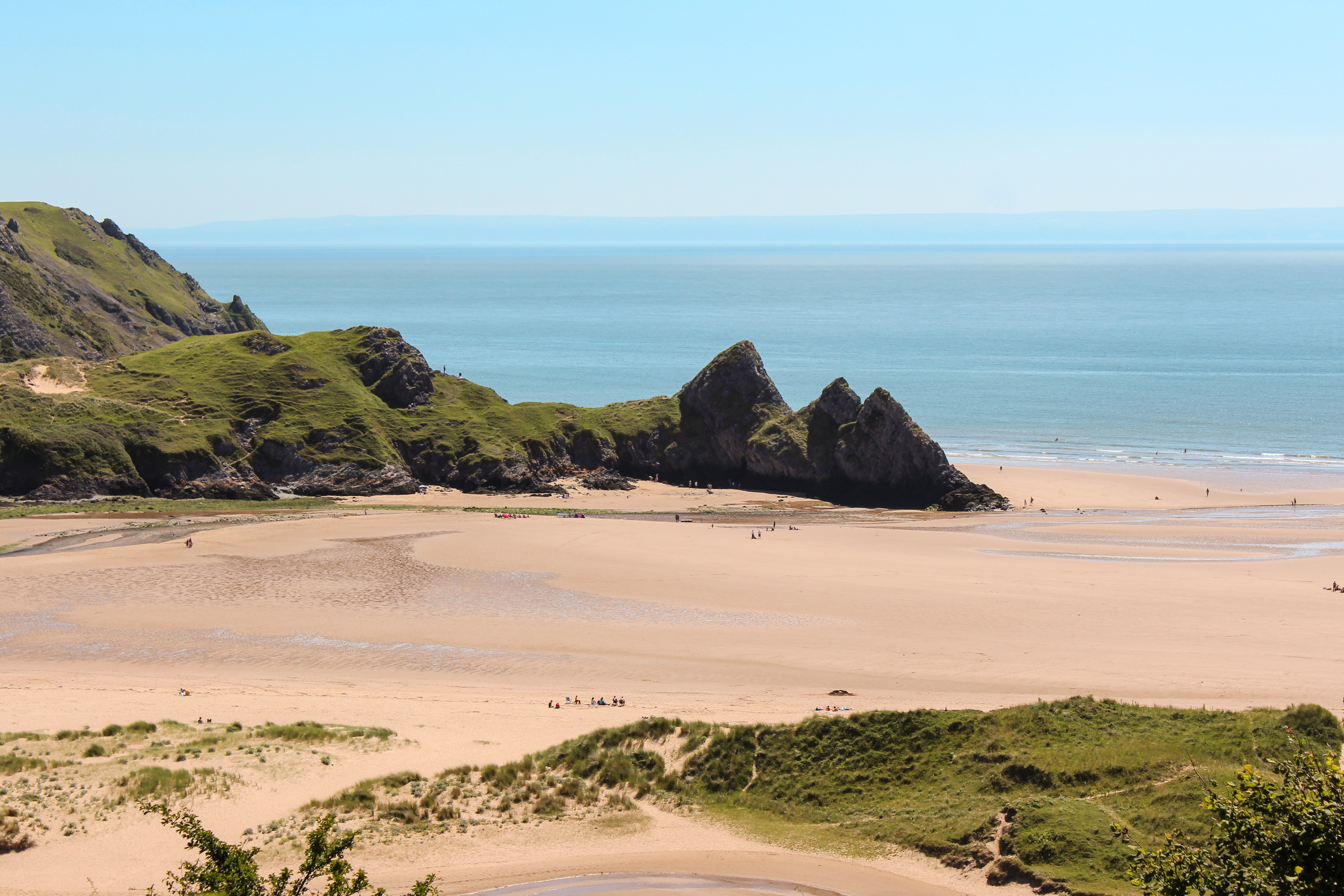

- Location within Swansea
- Principal area: Swansea
- Country: Wales
- Sovereign state: United Kingdom
- Police: South Wales
- Fire: Mid and West Wales
- Ambulance: Welsh

Three Cliffs Bay (Welsh: Bae y Tri Chlogwyn) (grid reference SS535876), otherwise Three Cliff Bay, is a bay on the south coast of the Gower Peninsula in the City and County of Swansea, Wales. The bay takes its name from the three sea cliffs that jut out into the bay. Pennard Pill, a large stream, flows into the sea in the middle of the bay.

== Description ==
Inland about 500 yards (450 m) from the main beach on high ground above Pennard Pill is Pennard Castle. It was built in the early 12th century, and is imbued with legends of fairies. It is also the only locality in Britain known for yellow whitlow grass (Draba aizoides).

Individual beaches that make up this bay have their own names, including Pobbles Bay to the east of the Three Cliffs, and Tor Bay to the west. The beaches are separated at high tide but are accessible to each other at low tide on foot over the sands. Paths lead north to Pennard Burrows, east to Pobbles, and west to Tor Bay. Pobbles and Tor Bay are also accessible from the beach at low tide. Three Cliffs Bay is effectively part of the inlet of Oxwich Bay. At low tide, Three Cliffs Bay forms a continuous sandy beach with Oxwich Bay beach to the west. They only exist as separate beaches at high tide.

The sea cliffs are limestone, about 20 m (65 ft) high, and are a popular destination for rock climbers with 20 climbs in the lower grades, including Scavenger (VS 4b) - often considered a national classic. The largest of the Three Cliffs is easily climbed if approached from the grassy base. The beach is an important asset for locals and visitors and routinely qualifies for Blue Flag status. Dogs are allowed on the beach all year.

== Use in media ==
In June 2006 the BBC Holidays at Home programme declared Three Cliffs Bay to be the best beach in the United Kingdom. In a similar programme broadcast on ITV the following year, the view over Three Cliffs Bay was nominated for "Britain's Best View".

Three Cliffs Bay appears in a music video for Red Hot Chili Peppers made by Swansea film company, Studio8. It was used in the opening titles of the 80's TV sitcom Me and My Girl featuring Richard O'Sullivan and Joanne Ridley.

Three Cliffs Bay has been used in Channel 4's Skins and was shown in an ITV advert: 'The Brighter Side'.

Season two of the BBC One television series The Night Manager features the Three Cliffs Bay area and a nearby local cottage.

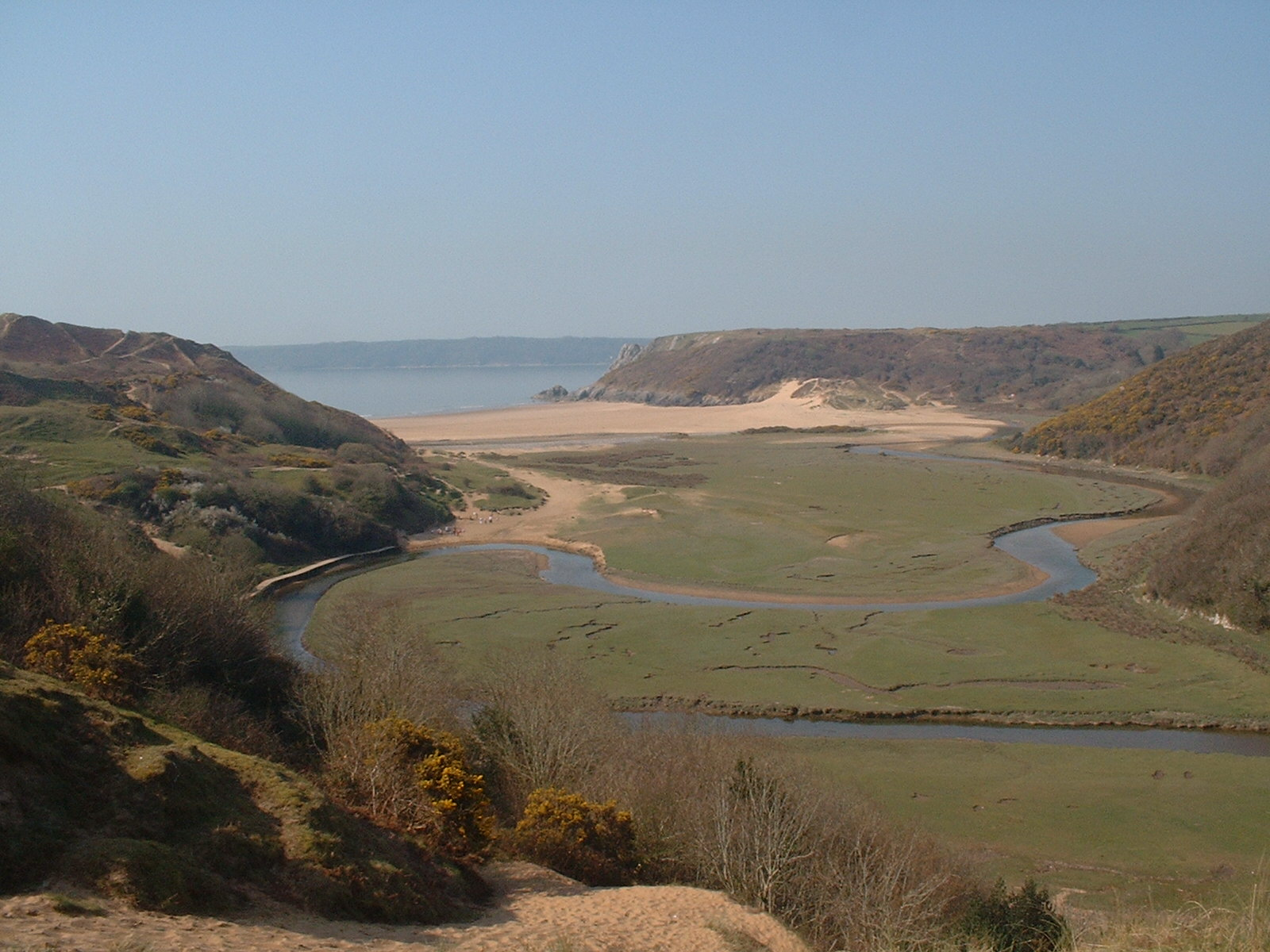
Three Cliffs Bay on the Gower Peninsula of South Wales

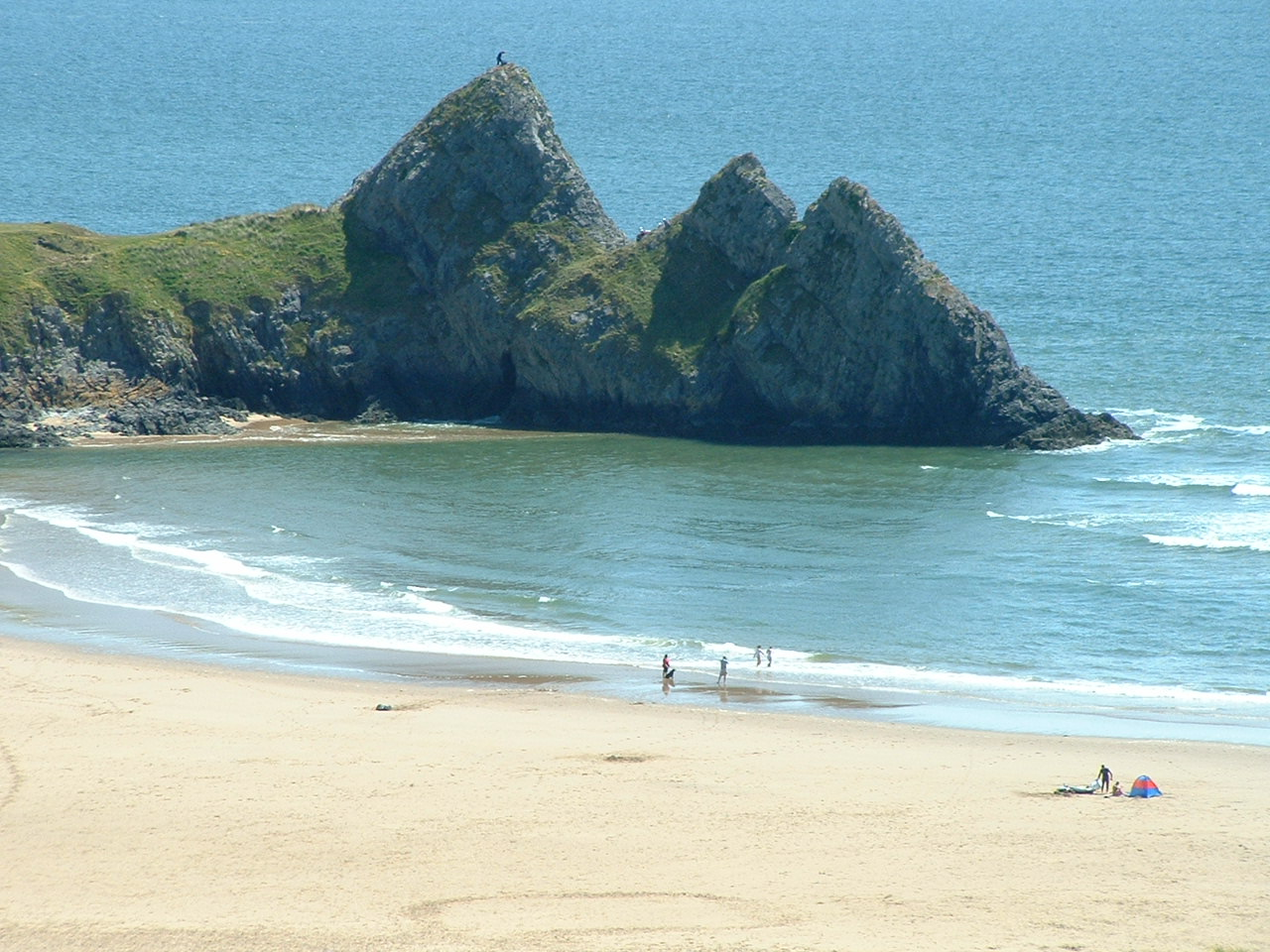
The formation of three peaks which give Three Cliffs Bay its name

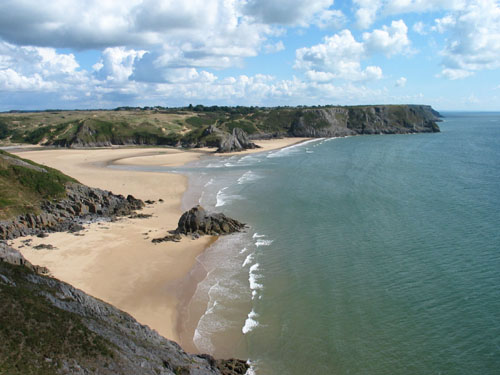
Three Cliffs Bay from the west

Pennard Castle
