= Port Eynon =

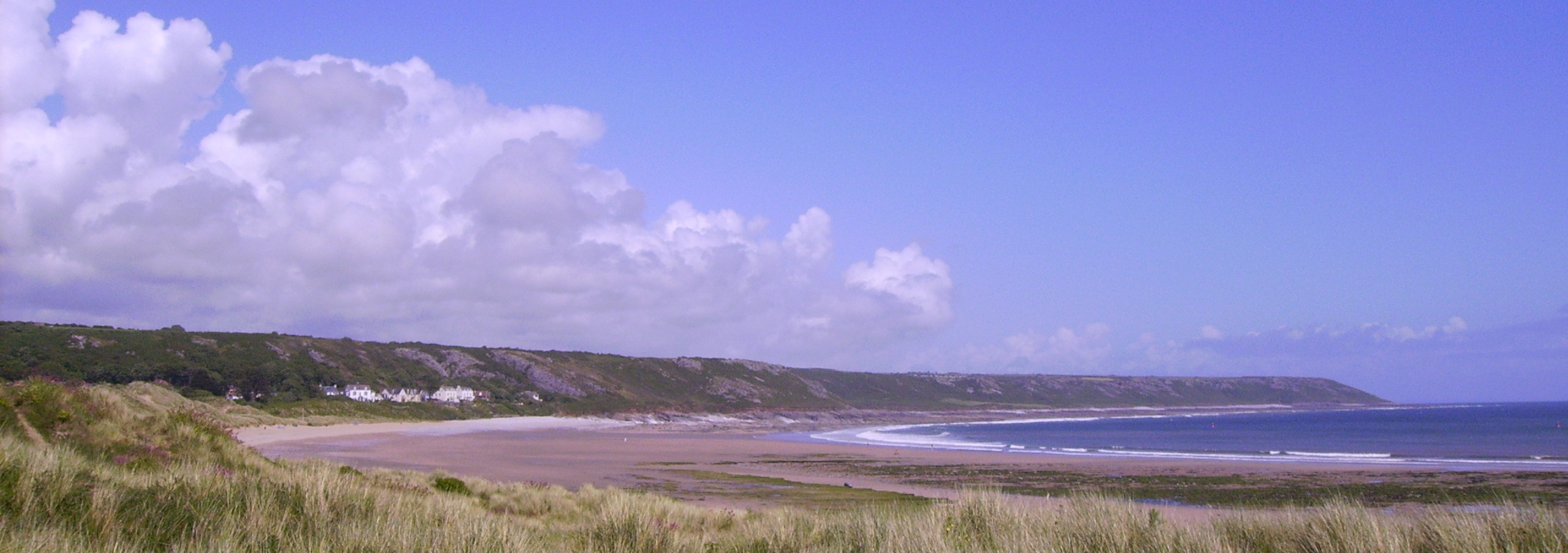
- Port Eynon Bay

- Location within Swansea
- Population: 574 (2001 census)
- OS grid reference: SS461852
- Principal area: Swansea
- Preserved county: West Glamorgan
- Country: Wales
- Sovereign state: United Kingdom
- Post town: SWANSEA
- Postcode district: SA3
- Dialling code: 01792
- Police: South Wales
- Fire: Mid and West Wales
- Ambulance: Welsh
- UK Parliament: Gower
- Senedd Cymru – Welsh Parliament: Gŵyr Abertawe
- List of places UK Wales Swansea 51.545°N 4.220°W Map of the community

Port Eynon (also spelt Port Einon, Porth Einon in Welsh; marked on Ordnance Survey maps as Port-Eynon) is a village and community within the City and County of Swansea, Wales, on the far south tip of the Gower Peninsula within the designated Area of Outstanding Natural Beauty. The A4118 from Swansea city centre terminates here.

The community has its own elected community council, and had a population of 597 in 2011. The community includes the hamlet of Llanddewi.

== Village ==
The village itself is fairly small and extends from the beach to the top of the hill. Port Eynon village has two fish and chip shops and a gift shop at the sea front, a Youth Hostel, two pubs, and a cafe /surf shop. The Youth Hostel is a converted lifeboat house, situated on the south end of the bay, near the salt house. A neighbouring village, Overton, is to the north west of Port Eynon and footpaths from Overton lead to Overton Mere, a stony and rocky beach. Also, the village of Horton is at the east end of the main beach, approximately half a mile from Port Eynon. Public transport is good throughout the season, and buses link the beaches so one can walk to a beach and catch the bus back. Port Eynon is on the Wales Coastal path and is well signposted from Rhossili and Oxwich.

== History ==
Port Eynon is thought to be named after Prince Einion of Deheubarth or an 11th-century Welsh Prince named Eynon. Eynon is a surname in Wales and the church graveyard in the village shows gravestones with this surname. It is believed that the prince built Port Eynon castle which no longer exists.

Culver Hole, an ancient, pre 16th century Dovecote, a Grade II listed scheduled monument, is located on the headland on the west side of Port Eynon point.

Smuggling is thought to have been a common engagement of the local residents in the 17th century to 19th century.

A derelict "salt house" used for extracting salt from sea water is located a quarter of a mile from the village, just off Port Eynon Point.

In the second half of the 18th century, through to 1919, a lifeboat was operated from Port Eynon. On several occasions, the lives of lifeboatmen were lost at sea on rescues. On 1 January 1916 the lives of three young men were lost in when the lifeboat went to the assistance of SS Dunvegan which was shipwrecked off Oxwich point. A memorial to these men exists in the village churchyard. Copies of news articles on the disaster can be seen on the wall of the local fish and chip shop in Port Eynon.

== Port Eynon Bay ==
Port Eynon Bay is a popular beach resort beside the village of Port Eynon. Port Eynon Point is the most southerly point of the Gower Peninsula. Both Port Eynon and Horton beaches have suffered from denudation of their sand cover, possibly caused by dredging activities in the Bristol Channel, though in recent years the sand cover has greatly improved.

== Notable residents ==
- The singer and actor Walter Glynne (1870–1945) lived and died here.
