= Rhossili =

Village and community in Swansea, Wales

Rhossili: Welsh: Rhosili
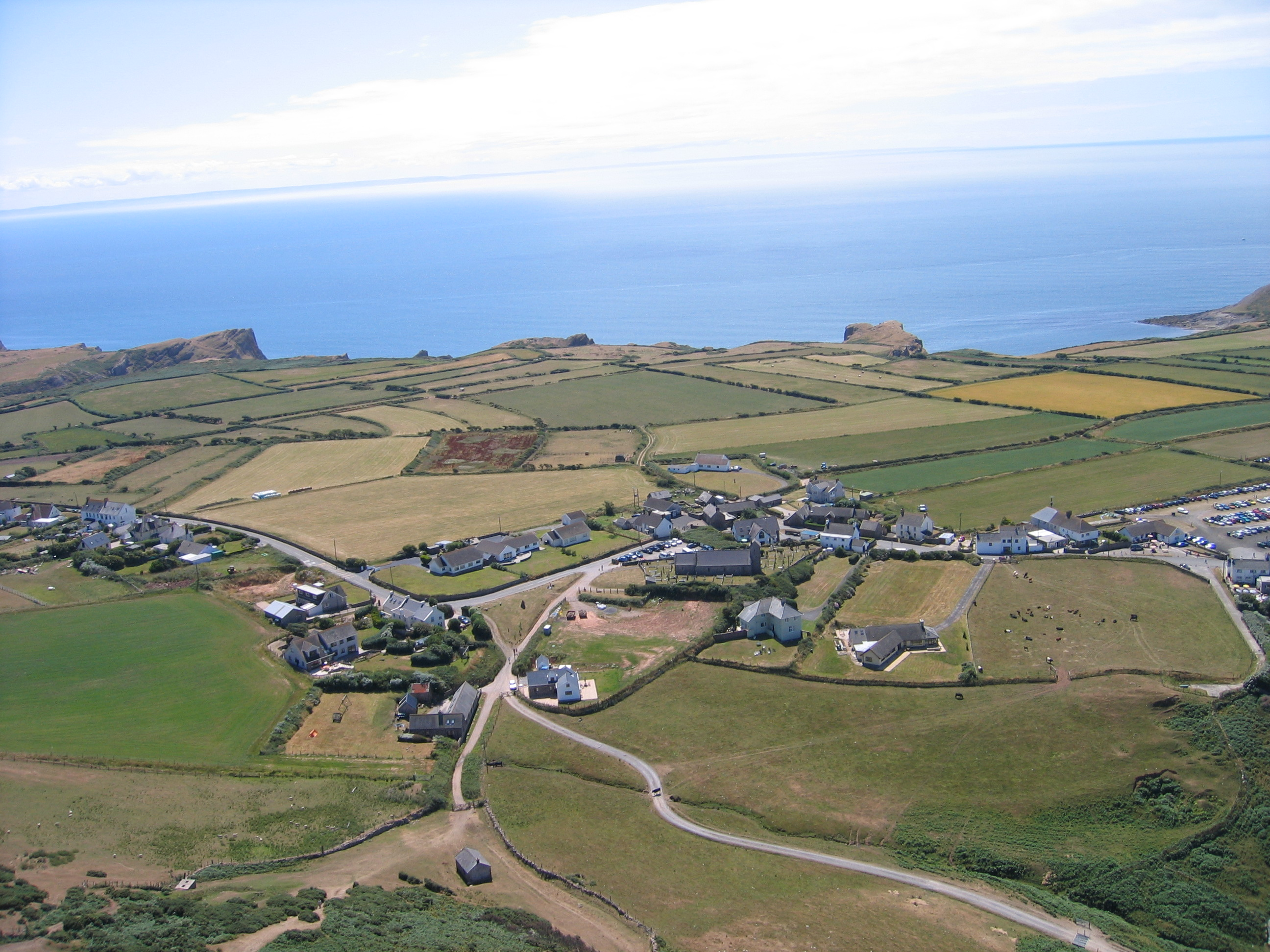

- Location within Swansea
- Population: 278
- OS grid reference: SS417881
- Community: Rhossili
- Principal area: Swansea
- Country: Wales
- Sovereign state: United Kingdom
- Post town: Swansea
- Postcode district: SA3
- Police: South Wales
- Fire: Mid and West Wales
- Ambulance: Welsh
- UK Parliament: Gower
- Senedd Cymru – Welsh Parliament: Gŵyr Abertawe
- List of places UK Wales Swansea 51.56856°N 4.28690°W Map of the community

Rhossili (Welsh: Rhosili; Welsh pronunciation) is a small village and community on the southwestern tip of the Gower Peninsula in Wales. It is within the first Area of Outstanding Natural Beauty in the United Kingdom. The village has a community council and is part of the Gower parliamentary constituency, and the Gower electoral ward. At the 2011 census, the population was 278. The community includes the hamlet of Middleton.

The name derives from the Welsh word rhos meaning a moor and the personal name Sulein, hence "Sulein's moorland promontory". Rhossili is a popular tourist destination: the views from the headland and the Down are panoramic; several pleasant walks begin, end, or pass through the village; Iron Age remains are found on Rhossili Down. The 2.8-mile (4.5 km) wide sandy beach is backed with sand dunes and attracts surfers at the Llangennith end as well as along the entire stretch of beach.

== Church ==
The present Norman church is dedicated to St Mary the Virgin. Inside there is a memorial to Edgar Evans, who was the first to perish on the Terra Nova Expedition with Captain Scott on the return from the South Pole.

== Rhossili Bay ==
Rhossili Bay curves along an arc running northwards from the village. The 2.8-mile (4.5 km) wide sandy beach is backed with sand dunes. Behind the beach just north of the village is Rhossili Down with the highest point on the Gower Peninsula, the Beacon (193 metres), and a number of prehistoric remains. It is between Rhossili Down and the beach that the Warren is found. In some of the fields on "The Vile" in Rhossili, the National Trust plant every year around 400,000 sunflowers. This is an extremely popular attraction for visitors to take selfies at during late July and early August, however there have been issues with some visitors picking the flowers.

At the southern end of the Bay is Worm's Head, consisting of two tidal islands: Outer Head 184 feet (56 m) and Inner Head 154 feet (47 m). At the north is Burry Holms. These islands are accessible only at low tide.

Rhossili Bay featured in the Opening Ceremony of the London 2012 Olympic Games, a youth choir began a cappella performances of "Bread of Heaven" live on the beach which was broadcast at the Olympic Stadium. The bay has been used as the setting of New Earth in the sci-fi show Doctor Who and the bay including the Old Rectory was used in Torchwood: Miracle Day. In 2014, it was voted the UK's number one beach, third best in Europe, and 9th best in the world, by TripAdvisor users.

== Fall Bay ==
Fall Bay is one of the most remote and hardest to reach beaches on Gower. The beach is never crowded due to its remoteness. There is no beach visible at high tide. The beach is very popular with surfers. At very low tide, it is possible to walk over from the beach to Mewslade Bay. The beach is reachable via a path which passes Rhossili village hall. It continues over fields and many stiles and has a steep final descent. The cliff path leads east to Mewslade Bay or westwards towards the Worm's Head and Rhossili Bay.

== Gallery ==
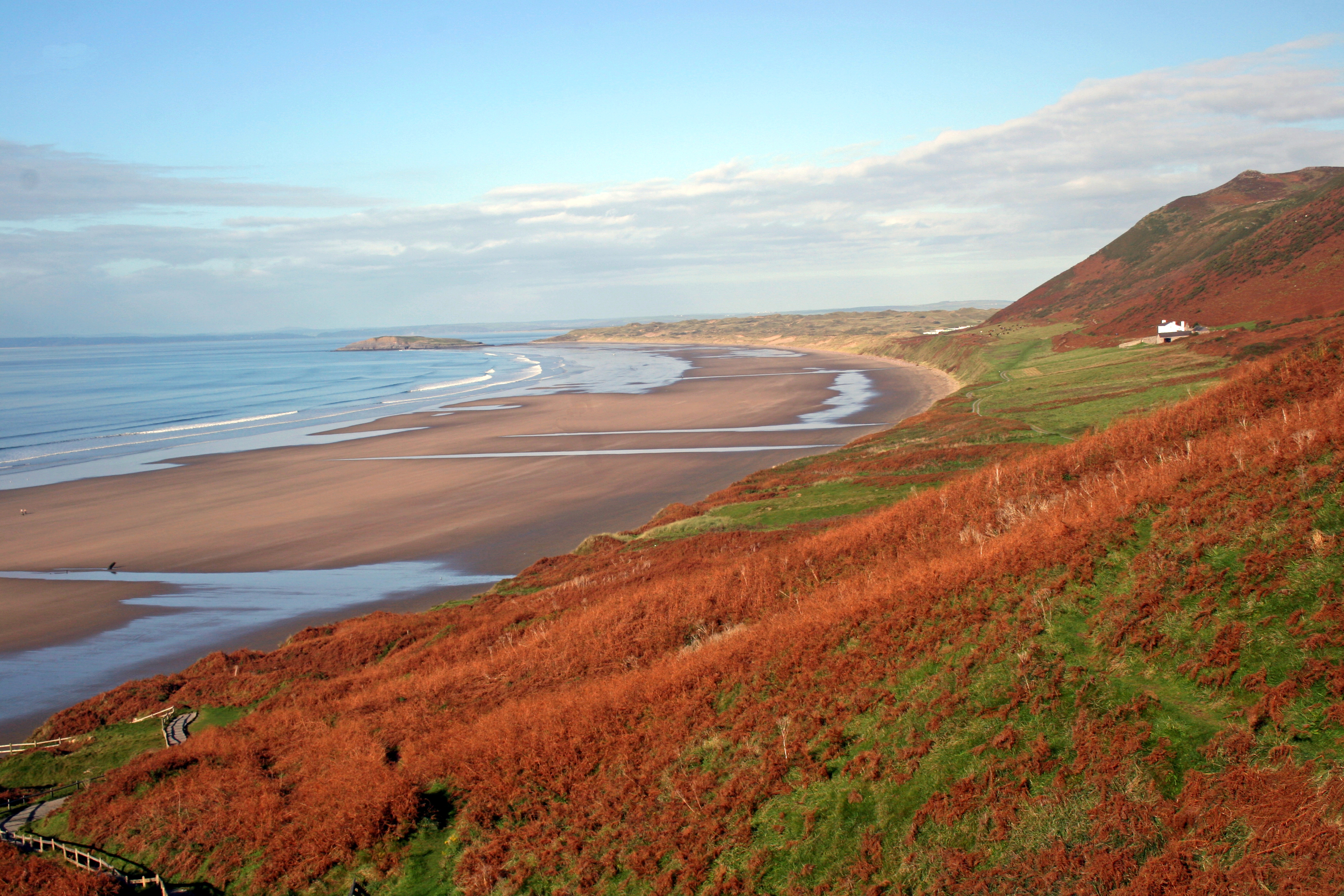
Rhossili beach in Autumn, 2010

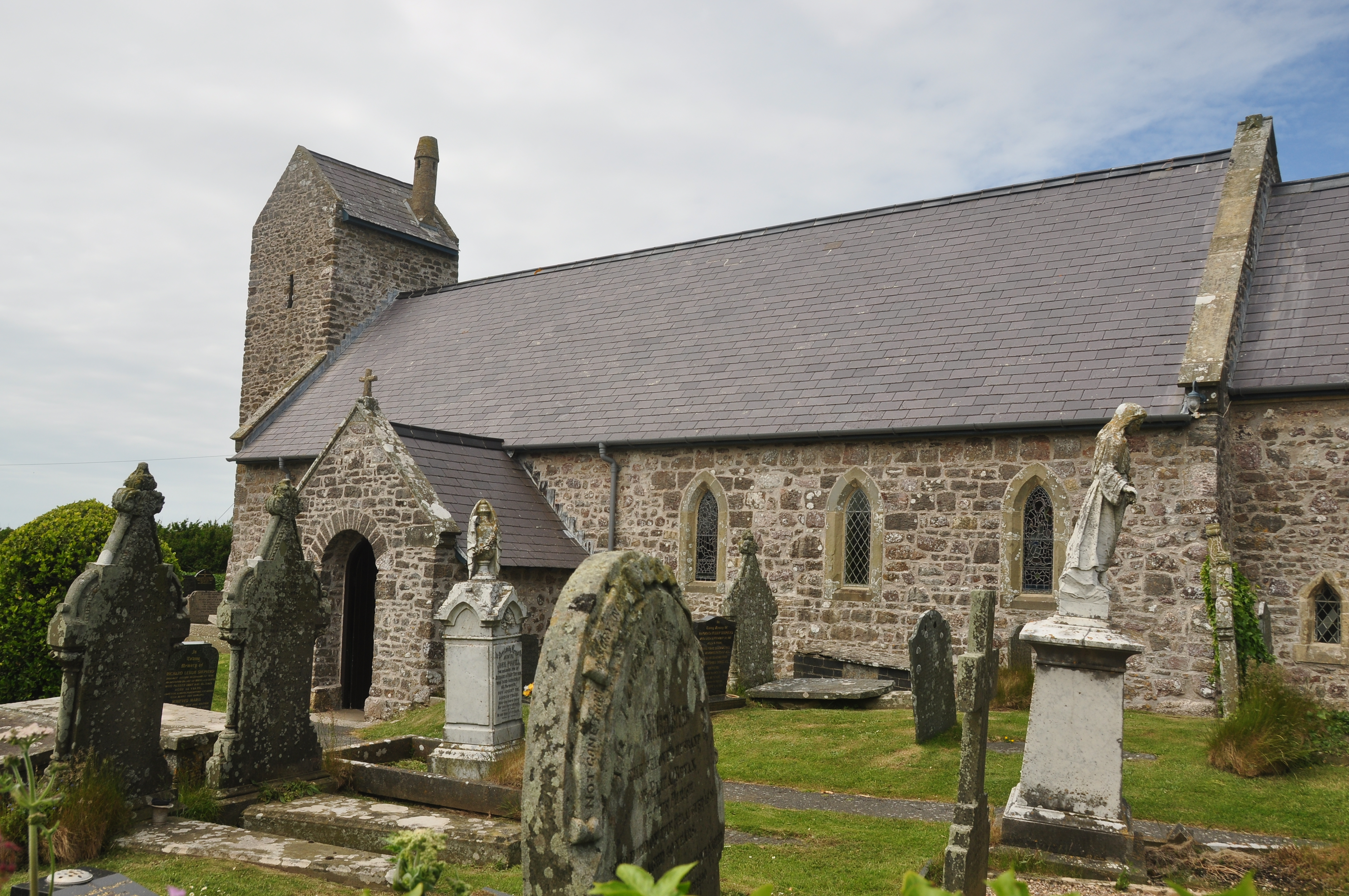
Church of St Mary the Virgin

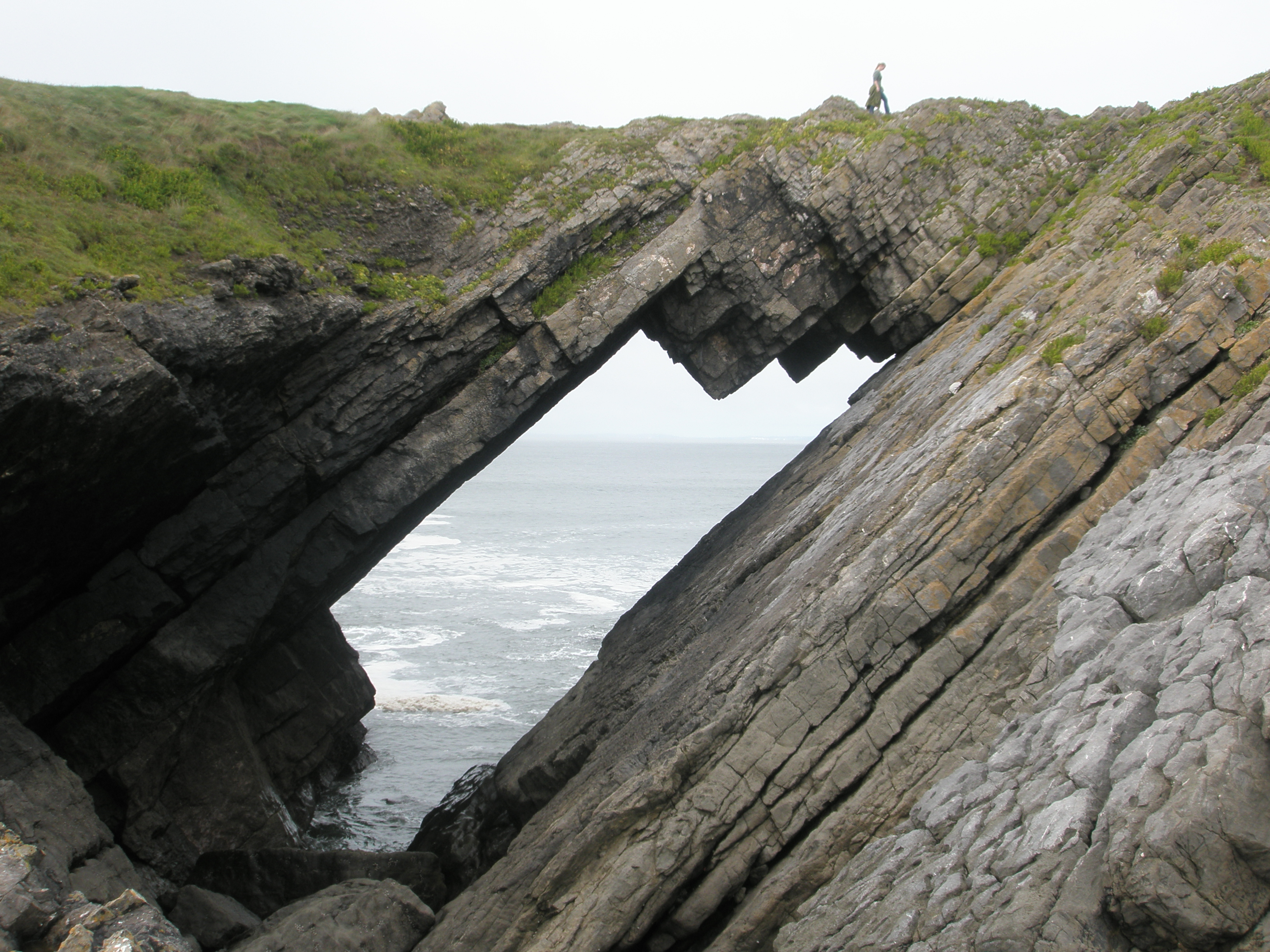
The Devil's Bridge at Worm's Head

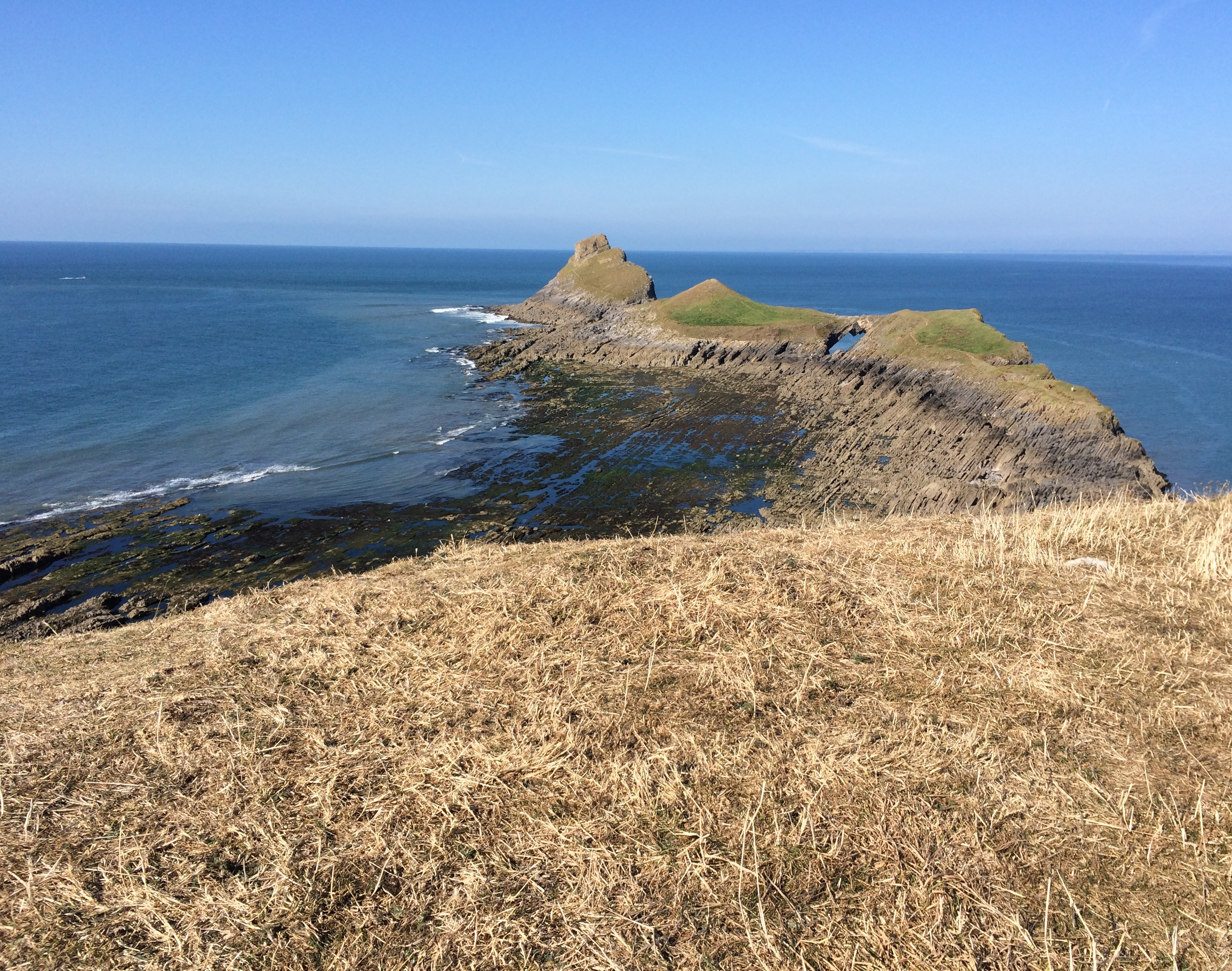
Worm's Head

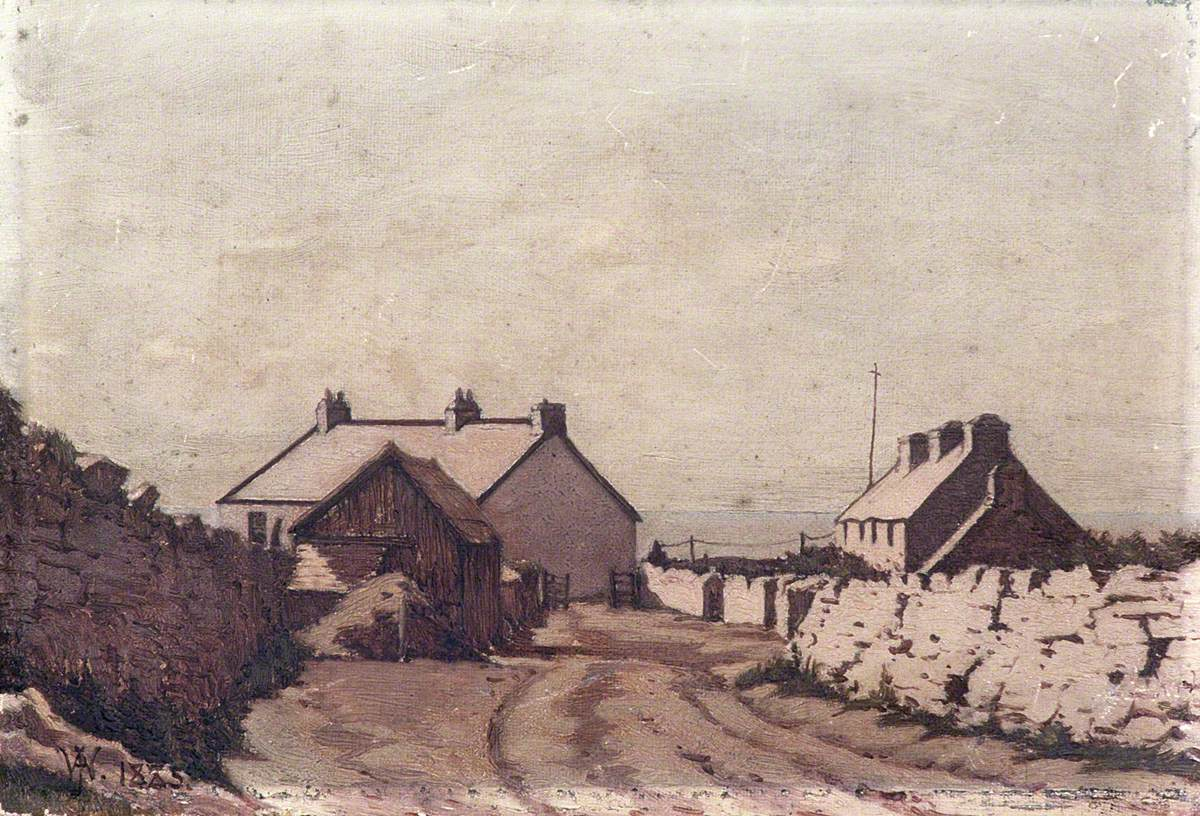
Road to Worms Head Cottage, by John Crawford (fl. 1885), picture in the art collection of the National Library of Wales

== Notable residents ==
- Edgar Evans, Antarctic explorer (a memorial tablet can be seen in the parish church)

== National Trust ==
The National Trust owns and protects much land on the Gower Peninsula. The Trust operates a visitor centre in Rhossili near the Warren, Rhossili Down, Worm's Head, Rhossili beach and coastal cliffs. Scenes from Torchwood: Miracle Day were filmed at the National Trust's Old Rectory cottage in Rhossili Bay.

== Skinny dipping ==
On 19 June 2011, almost four hundred people attempted to break the world record for the largest number of people skinny dipping at one time in the sea at Rhossili.

== See also ==
- Villages in Gower
