= Registered historic parks and gardens in Swansea =

List of buildings in county of Wales

Swansea shown within Wales

The City and County of Swansea is a principal area in south Wales. It covers an area of 380 km^{2} (150 sq mi) and in 2021 the population was approximately 237,800.

The Cadw/ICOMOS Register of Parks and Gardens of Special Historic Interest in Wales was established in 2002 and given statutory status in 2022. It is administered by Cadw, the historic environment agency of the Welsh Government. Elisabeth Whittle described Cadw as having a "somewhat special and guiding role" in the preservation of historic parks and gardens, since they are "an integral part of Welsh archaeological and architectural heritage". The register includes just under 400 sites, ranging from gardens of private houses, to cemeteries and public parks. Parks and gardens are listed at one of three grades, matching the grading system used for listed buildings. Grade I is the highest grade, for sites of exceptional interest; Grade II*, the next highest, denotes parks and gardens of great quality; while Grade II denotes sites of special interest.

There are 14 registered parks and gardens in Swansea. Three are listed at Grade I, and eleven at Grade II.

== Key ==
Grade	Criteria
I	Parks and gardens of exceptional interest
II*	Parks and gardens of great quality
II	Parks and gardens of special interest

== List of parks and gardens ==
List of parks and gardens
Name	Location Grid Ref. (Note: Sometimes known as OSGB36, the grid reference is based on the British national grid reference system used by the Ordnance Survey.) Geo-coordinates	Date Listed	Description / Notes	Grade	Reference Number	Image
Brynmill Park	Uplands; SS6336592609; 51°36′55″N 3°58′25″W	1 February 2022	Public park The dominant feature of the park is the lake, a former reservoir, which is home to a range of wildfowl. The park opened in 1872 and the bowling green was added in 1907.	II	PGW(Gm)46(SWA)	Brynmill Park
Clyne Castle	Sketty; SS6083391503; 51°36′17″N 4°00′35″W	1 February 2022	Park and gardens Until the 1950s the castle, with its ornamental woodlands and gardens, was the private estate of the Vivian family. The grounds, which were developed throughout the nineteenth and the first half of the twentieth century, are now a public park.	I	PGW(Gm)47(SWA)	a view of the park with numerous types of trees and shrubs
Cwmgelli Cemetery	Mynyddbach; SS6559896562; 51°39′05″N 3°56′35″W	1 February 2022	Cemetery garden The chapel was built in 1895 and the earliest graves, from 1899-1915, are nearby. The cemetery is planted with a mixture of trees, shrubs and roses.	II	PGW(Gm)60(SWA)	a cemetery with trees in the distance
Cwmdonkin Park	Uplands; SS6371193294; 51°37′17″N 3°58′08″W	1 February 2022	Public park The Victorian park retains much of its original layout from 1874. The sporting facilities are later additions and consist of tennis courts, a bowling green and a pavilion that serves as a shop and café.	II	PGW(Gm)48(SWA)	The pavilion; a green and white coloured building, with a brick-red tiled roof
The Dingle	Mumbles; SS5964887857; 51°34′18″N 4°01′32″W	1 February 2022	Pleasure garden Built in the early twentieth century as the ornamental garden of Summerland House. Although the house was demolished in c. 1995 the Arts and Crafts style garden remained and underwent restoration work in the early twenty-first century.	II	PGW(Gm)74(SWA)	
Fairyhill	Reynoldston; SS4658291244; 51°35′55″N 4°12′55″W	1 February 2022	Park, kitchen garden and woodland garden The small park and informal wooded grounds of the Georgian country house were laid out in the eighteenth and mid-nineteenth century. The walled kitchen gardens are to the north of the house.	II	PGW(Gm)49(SWA)	Fairyhill
Kilvrough	Pennard; SS5575189468; 51°35′06″N 4°04′56″W	1 February 2022	Park, country house garden and kitchen garden Kilvrough manor is a late Georgian mansion surrounded by gardens and within a small landscape park. The Italian Garden and the kitchen garden (now ornamental) are to the north-west of the house. The gardens are mostly of the early nineteenth century.	II	PGW(Gm)51(SWA)	Kilvrough
Parc Llewelyn	Landore; SS6595596868; 51°39′15″N 3°56′17″W	1 February 2022	Public park The park was created from 1874 on farmland donated by John Dillwyn Llewelyn, after whom it is named, and opened in 1874. In the south-west of the park is a garden area and bowling green, the rest of the park is mostly rolling grassland.	II	PGW(Gm)75(SWA)	a grassy hillside with trees and houses in the distance
Penllergare	Penllergaer; SS6247798348; 51°40′00″N 3°59′20″W	1 February 2022	Walled garden and woodland garden The park was primarily created from the 1833 onwards by John Dillwyn Llewelyn, a botanist and pioneer of photography. The house (demolished in 1961) was situated at the northern end of the park. The ground were landscaped with lakes, waterfalls and exotic planting. Llewelyn also built an observatory from which, in 1855, one of the earliest photographs of the moon was taken. The walled garden was the site of an orchideous house, now a scheduled monument.	II	PGW(Gm)54(SWA)	the observatory; a stone building with a round tower, the top of which is clad in metal
Penrice Castle	Penrice; SS4982887916; 51°34′11″N 4°10′02″W	1 February 2022	Park and gardens The landscaping, which Cadw describes as "of exceptional quality, rarity and state of preservation", incorporates the ruined medieval castle. The Grade I listed house was built in the 1770s and layout of the park and gardens is mainly from this period up to the 1810s. The present-day terraced garden was laid out in the 1890s when the Victorian wing was added to the house.	I	PGW(Gm)68(SWA)	a wooded hillside, there is a large house, behind which are the ruins of a castle
Singleton Park and Sketty Hall	Sketty; SS6284892290; 51°36′44″N 3°58′52″W	1 February 2022	Park and gardens The urban public park was originally the grounds of the country houses of Sketty Hall and Singleton Abbey. Their parkland and gardens covered 230 acres (93 ha) which has since been reduced by the building of a school, a hospital and a university campus in the twentieth century. The site includes ornamental and botanic gardens, a model farm and a boating lake.	I	PGW(Gm)56(SWA)	a grass area with a path through it, in the background are trees, a park bench is in the foreground.
St. James's Gardens and Crescent	Uplands; SS6426993028; 51°37′09″N 3°57′39″W	1 February 2022	Public park The Crescent is the semi-circular area in which St James's Church was built in the 1860s. The Gardens are a rectangular space to the north of this which were laid out informally with ornamental trees and shrubs between 1878 and 1913.	II	PGW(Gm)55(SWA)	St. James's Gardens and Crescent
Stouthall	Reynoldston; SS4745589424; 51°34′57″N 4°12′07″W	1 February 2022	Kitchen garden and woodland garden The grounds were probably initially laid out at the same time as the building of the late Georgian house which was built in 1787–1790 to the north-east of an earlier house. The pleasure grounds lie to the south and east of the house and to the west, north and north-east of the house is a small park.	II	PGW(Gm)57(SWA)	a large house in landscape of fields and trees
Victoria Park, Swansea	Uplands; SS6412492327; 51°36′46″N 3°57′45″W	1 February 2022	Public park The park opened in 1887 on land that had previously been open space and had been used for football and cricket. The Patti Pavilion, which stands at the south-western end of the park, was moved here from Craig-y-Nos Castle in 1920. Swansea Guildhall, built in the 1930s, occupies land that was originally part of the park.	II	PGW(Gm)61(SWA)	The pavilion; a white building with a green roof

== See also ==
- List of scheduled monuments in Swansea
- Grade I listed buildings in Swansea
- Grade II* listed buildings in Swansea
