= Hancorne family =

Hancorne family Hancorn
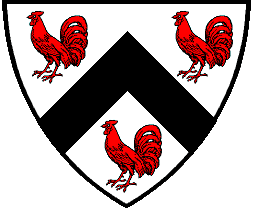
- Argent, a chevron Sable between three cocks Gules
- Country: United Kingdom
- Place of origin: Warwickshire, England

The Hancorne (or Hancorn) family were a prominent landed family living chiefly in the English counties of Warwickshire and Herefordshire, and the Welsh counties of Breconshire and Glamorgan, between the Caroline era and the 19th century.

== Origin ==
According to family tradition, the Hancornes are descended from three brothers who fled to Britain from Spain to avoid religious persecution. D. H. H. Grainger suggested the family were of Marrano origin. A grant of arms was made to the family in 1627. The coat of arms includes three cocks, representing the three brothers, after which the village of Three Cocks in Breconshire is named.

== Pedigree ==
The earliest known member of the most prominent line of the family was Thomas Hancorne (died 1644).

- Thomas Hancorne (died 1644)
  - Samuel Hancorne (died 1691)
    - Rev. Thomas Hancorne (1642–1731)
      - Rev. Thomas Hancorne (1674–1727)
      - Edward Hancorne (1676–1741)
        - Thomas Hancorne (1715–1762)
        - Edward Hancorne (1717–1792)
          - George Hancorne (1761–1809)
          - Robert Hancorne (1766–1798)
        - Samuel Hancorne (1719–1795)
          - Rev. Thomas Mansel Hancorne (1752–1838)
          - Richard Hancorn (1754–1792)
      - Rev. Richard Hancorne (1687–1732)
  - Thomas Hancorne (died 1674)
    - John Hancorn (died 1700)
  - Richard Hancorn (died 1704)
    - Richard Hancorn (died 1729)
      - Richard Hancorn (1684–1751)
        - Rev. Richard Hancorn Duppa (1727–1789)
        - Baldwin Hancorn Duppa (1727–1795)
          - Baldwin Duppa Duppa (1763–1847)
      - Thomas Hancorn (1696–1777)
        - John Hancorn (1734–1811)
          - John Hancorn (1778–1858)
            - James Richard Hancorn (1808–1861)

== Hancornes of Warwickshire ==
The earliest Hancorne reference comes from Warwickshire with John and Agnes Hancorne who appear in a register of members of the Guild of Knowle.

== Hancornes of Herefordshire ==
The Hancornes were established in Herefordshire since the 17th century. Thomas Hancorne (died 1644) had three known sons:

- Samuel Hancorne (died 1691), who established the Hancornes of Wales.
- Thomas Hancorne (died 1674), who married Elinor Higgins and died in Clifford, Herefordshire.
- Richard Hancorn (died 1704), who established the Hancorns of Hereford.

=== Whitney ===
Richard Hancorn (1684–1751), son of Richard (died 1729) and Eleanor Duppa, and grandson of Richard Hancorn (died 1704), lived at Millhalf Farm, Millhalf in Whitney. His son, Rev. Richard Hancorn Duppa (1727–1789), inherited the Manors of Hollingbourne Hill and Combe Manor in Kent along other estates belonging to his kinsman, Baldwin Duppa, with an injunction for him to take the name and arms of Duppa, for which an act was passed by George III. His brother, Baldwin Hancorn Duppa (1727–1795), inherited the estates and also took the name of Duppa, as did his son, Baldwin Duppa Duppa (1763–1847) JP DL of Hollingbourne House, Maidstone, Kent, who had ten children by his wife Mary, daughter of Henry Gladwin.

== Hancornes of Breconshire ==
Samuel Hancorne (died 1691) moved from Whitney, Herefordshire to Glasbury, Breconshire. He established the later Hancornes of Breconshire and Glamorgan.

== Hancornes of Glamorgan ==
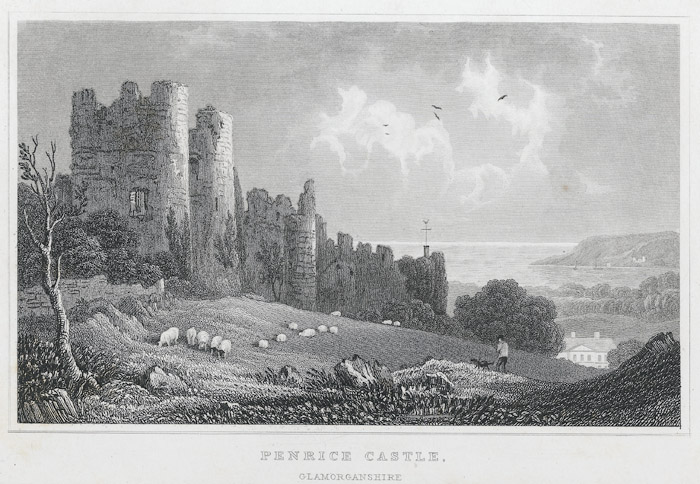
Penrice Castle, Glamorganshire, c.1760

Rev. Thomas Hancorne (1642–1731), the eldest son of Samuel Hancorne (died 1691), established his family in Glamorgan. The Glamorgan Hancornes were prominent members of the "Sea Serjeants", a Jacobite club led by David Morgan and Sir John Philipps, 6th Baronet that largely composed of South Wales gentry and the Independent Electors of Westminster. Thomas had several children by his wife Cecilia, including:

- Rev. Thomas Hancorne (1674–1727), a theologian at Jesus College and St Mary Hall
- Edward Hancorne (1676–1741), agent and solicitor to Thomas Mansel, 1st Baron Mansel who married Elizabeth, daughter of Thomas Mansel of Penrice Castle
- Rev. Richard Hancorne (1687–1732), a theologian, who was the rector of Barry and Sully

=== Penrice Castle ===
Edward Hancorne (1676–1741) settled at The Pitt, between Penrice and Oxwich. He gained possession of Penrice Castle and its lands following his marriage in 1708 to Elizabeth, daughter of Thomas Mansel of Penrice Castle, whose family had owned the lands since 1410. Thomas Hancorne (1715–1762), the eldest son of Edward, inherited the lands upon his father's death.

=== Berry Hall ===
Edward Hancorne (1717–1792), the second eldest son of Edward (1676–1741), settled at Berry Hall, Glamorgan. His eldest son, George Hancorne (1761–1809), inherited the lands upon his father's death. Edward's younger son, Robert Hancorne (1766–1798), an attorney at Gray's Inn, settled at Bishopston House, Bishopston.
