= Grade II* listed buildings in Swansea =

Swansea shown within Wales

In the United Kingdom, the term listed building refers to a building or other structure officially designated as being of special architectural, historical, or cultural significance; Grade II* structures are those considered to be "particularly important buildings of more than special interest". Listing was begun by a provision in the Town and Country Planning Act 1947. Once listed, strict limitations are imposed on the modifications allowed to a building's structure or fittings. In Wales, the authority for listing under the Planning (Listed Buildings and Conservation Areas) Act 1990 rests with Cadw.

== Buildings ==
Name	Location Grid Ref. (Note: Sometimes known as OSGB36, the grid reference is based on the British national grid reference system used by the Ordnance Survey.) Geo-coordinates	Date Listed	Function	Notes	Reference Number	Image
Felindre water mill	Felindre; SN6374802732; 51°42′24″N 3°58′24″W	12 April 1989	Water Mill	Situated in centre of Felindre, a substantially complete early 19th century corn mill, with intact machinery and workshop buildings.	11210	Felindre water mill
Church of St Teilo, Bishopston	Bishopston; SS5779389360; 51°35′06″N 4°03′14″W	6 March 1964	Church	Situated in a large rectangular churchyard which slopes down to the Bishopston Valley towards the W and is surrounded by trees.	11520	See more images
Church of St Illtyd, Ilston	Ilston; SS5566290327; 51°35′36″N 4°05′06″W	6 March 1964	Church	In the village of Ilston, east of the stream, reached by a footbridge. Rubble graveyard wall without coping, opened at south to extension graveyard. Oak gate with adjacent stile at main entrance, two other gates. Low retaining wall to yew tree mound.	11524	See more images
Church of St Cenydd, Llangennith	Llangennith; SS4286791416; 51°35′59″N 4°16′13″W	6 March 1964	Church	In the village of Llangennith. Stone churchyard wall; war memorial NE of churchyard is a white marble Celtic cross with interlacing on face. Early C20 timber-framed lychgate to N. To the S is the site of the ancient College of Llangennith.	11527	See more images
Parish Church of St Rhidian and St Illtyd, Llanrhidian	Llanrhidian Lower; SS4967492250; 51°36′32″N 4°10′20″W	6 March 1964	Parish church	At the centre of Llanrhidian village, surrounded by a rubble limestone churchyard wall with C19 wrought iron gates and three stiles. Macadam path, cobbles at porch.	11533	See more images
Penrice Towers gatehouse	Ilston; SS5016988383; 51°34′28″N 4°09′49″W	6 March 1964	Gatehouse	At the main entrance to Penrice Castle park, forming a picturesque focal point where the road to Port Eynon is diverted to the north of the park. The gatelodge (Penrice Towers) is to the north of the gates. (Detached south turret separately listed)	11535	Penrice Towers gatehouse
Church of St Illtyd	Penrice; SS5042286123; 51°33′15″N 4°09′32″W	6 March 1964	Church	1km from Oxwich village, on a site overlooking Oxwich Bay and reached by the coast footpath. Square churchyard with a stone wall; modern gate.	11536	See more images
Kilvrough Manor	Pennard; SS5591089316; 51°35′03″N 4°04′52″W	6 March 1964	House	Approximately 0.8km NNW of Pennard church, on the S side and reached by a short drive off the A4118 E of Parkmill.	11538	See more images
Pennard Castle	Pennard; SS5440288507; 51°34′36″N 4°06′09″W	6 March 1964	Castle	Dramatically sited on the cliff overlooking Pennard Pill and Threecliff Bay and on the W edge of Pennard golf course.	11539	See more images
St Andrew's Church, Penrice	Penrice; SS4930787939; 51°34′13″N 4°10′33″W	6 March 1964	Church	In the hamlet of Penrice, 1km SW of Penrice Castle. Churchyard wall in rubble limestone with irregular coping, two stiles, iron gate.	11542	See more images
Penrice Castle (Ruins)	Penrice; SS4966988492; 51°34′31″N 4°10′15″W	6 March 1964	Castle (ruin)	Hilltop position in parkland of Penrice Castle mansion 300m south of the A4118. The mansion itself is Grade I listed.	11543	See more images
Pitt Farmhouse	Penrice; SS4928487089; 51°33′45″N 4°10′33″W	6 March 1964	Farmhouse	At roadside, about 1km south of Penrice church. Small walled enclosure to north, separate to farmyard; gardens to south. Outbuildings in the north enclosure.	11545	Upload Photo
Church of St Mary, Rhossili	Rhossili; SS4166488080; 51°34′09″N 4°17′10″W	6 March 1964	Church	At the centre of Rhossili village. Stone churchyard wall in rubble masonry with some older gravestones built into rear face; timber gates E and W, stile beside E gate.	11547	See more images
Morgans Hotel	City centre SS6599992878; 51°37′07″N 3°56′13″W	30 March 1987 (as Offices of Associated British Ports)	Hotel	Dated 1902, opened 1903.	11548	See more images
Glynn Vivian Art Gallery	City centre SS6550393463; 51°37′26″N 3°56′40″W	30 March 1987	Art Gallery	Dated 1909.	11553	See more images
Bethesda Baptist Church, Swansea	City centre SS6578393897; 51°37′40″N 3°56′26″W	30 March 1987		Set below road level in a railed burial ground on the corner with Prince of Wales Road.	11554	See more images
Varsity	City centre SS6569092997; 51°37′11″N 3°56′29″W	30 March 1987 (as Midland Bank)	Bank	Occupying a substantial corner site, St Mary's Street to left side.	11570	See more images
Ebenezer Baptist Chapel, Swansea	City centre SS6565393693; 51°37′34″N 3°56′32″W	30 March 1987	Chapel	Dominant building in a narrow side street off High Street and close to the railway station.	11574	See more images
Ebenezer Baptist Chapel Hall	City centre SS6565293682; 51°37′33″N 3°56′32″W	30 March 1987	Chapel Hall	Dominant building in a narrow side street off High Street and close to the railway station.	11575	See more images
Mount Pleasant Baptist Church, Swansea	City centre SS6541693176; 51°37′17″N 3°56′44″W	30 March 1987	Church	Prominently sited on the corner with Dynevor Place.	11590	See more images
Mount Pleasant Baptist Church Hall	City centre SS6542693184; 51°37′17″N 3°56′43″W	30 March 1987	Church hall	Prominently sited on the corner with Dynevor Place.	11591	See more images
Mount Pleasant Baptist School blocks	City centre SS6542193180; 51°37′17″N 3°56′44″W	30 March 1987	School	Prominently sited on the corner with Dynevor Place.	11592	See more images
Dylan Thomas Centre	City centre SS6607992929; 51°37′09″N 3°56′09″W	30 March 1987 (as The Old Guildhall)	Arts centre	Large public building close to River Tawe and the former site of West Docks.	11643	See more images
Swansea Museum	City centre SS6591892768; 51°37′04″N 3°56′17″W	23 April 1952	Museum	Erected 1839-41.	11653	See more images
Swansea Museum boundary walls and rails	City centre SS6590092795; 51°37′05″N 3°56′18″W	23 April 1952	Museum walls/railings		11654	See more images
Musgrave engine house and chimney	Landore; SS6617994957; 51°38′15″N 3°56′07″W	1 March 1980	Engine House	Located at the southern part of the former Hafod and Morfa copperworks site, it was built in 1910 to house a uniflow-type steam engine to power the copper-rolling mill. Pistons, flywheel and rollers are all still in place, in the derelict building. Production ceased in 1980.	11697	Musgrave engine house and chimney
New Siloh Congregational Chapel, including gates and railings	Landore; SS6569795712; 51°38′39″N 3°56′33″W	30 March 1987	Chapel	Occupying a prominent corner position at the top of Siloh Hill, long flank elevation to Pentre Treharn Road; ground falls steeply to E.	11703	See more images
Mumbles Lighthouse	Mumbles; SS6348187167; 51°34′01″N 3°58′16″W	24 June 1986	Lighthouse	Situated on an exposed rocky tidal islet at Mumbles Head.	11721	See more images
Clyne Castle	Mumbles; SS6139990630; 51°35′51″N 4°00′09″W	20 October 1994	Castle	Approx. 600m from junction with Mumbles Road.	14931	See more images
Stouthall	Reynoldston; SS4747289255; 51°34′53″N 4°12′10″W	20 July 1973	House	At north side of the B4118 1km west of Little Reynoldston, standing in parkland.	19870	Stouthall
Capel Gellionnen	Mawr; SN7007004150; 51°43′16″N 3°52′57″W	11 October 1977	Chapel	Situated in a remote rural position high on Mynydd Gellionen reached down a track off the minor road from Rhyd-y-gwin.	22087	See more images
Hendrefoilan House	Killay; SS6128693646; 51°37′28″N 4°00′19″W	29 September 1999		Located at the end of a lane which leads off the road through the Hendrefoilan student village. The village was built in the grounds of the house. The stable block, now converted to a library, is to the NW.	22370	Hendrefoilan House
Penrice Castle Dovecote	Penrice; SS4973488476; 51°34′30″N 4°10′11″W	29 October 1999	Dovecote	Attached to the west side of Penrice Castle (ruins).	22539	Upload Photo
Church of St David, Port Eynon	Port Eynon; SS4600589053; 51°34′45″N 4°13′26″W	6 March 1964	Church	In a nearly square graveyard in the farm hamlet of Llanddewi, 4km north of Port Eynon village. Rubble limestone and sandstone graveyard wall with iron gate to south; two stiles.	22793	See more images
Whiteford Lighthouse	Llangennith, Llanmadoc and Cheriton; SS4437497261; 51°39′09″N 4°15′04″W	3 March 2000	Lighthouse	On a shingle bank to the south of the entrance to Burry River, and to the north of Whiteford Sands, 4 km north of Llanmadoc village	22885	See more images
Church of St Nicholas, Ilston	Ilston; SS5124988427; 51°34′30″N 4°08′53″W	19 July 2000	Church	At the south side of the road from Penmaen to Penrice. Square churchyard with gate and stile at the north-west corner.	23538	See more images
Penrice Castle North-East Gates, Railings and Piers	Ilston; SS5018088367; 51°34′27″N 4°09′48″W	19 July 2000	Castle gates/railings	At the main entrance to Penrice Castle park, where the road from Swansea to Port Eynon is diverted to the north of the park.	23541	Penrice Castle North-East Gates, Railings and Piers
Outlying tower designed to complement Penrice Towers	Ilston; SS5019488354; 51°34′27″N 4°09′47″W	19 July 2000	Tower	To the south east of the main gates to Penrice park, built into the park boundary wall.	23550	Upload Photo
Church of St David and St Cyfelach, Llangyfelach	Llangyfelach; SS6461098970; 51°40′23″N 3°57′34″W	28 February 2002	Church	Situated near the centre of Llangyfelach just W of the B4489 (Swansea Road) and S of the A48.	26235	See more images
Tower of Church of St David and St Cyfelach, Llangyfelach	Llangyfelach; SS6463398934; 51°40′22″N 3°57′32″W	28 February 2002	Church	Situated just S of the church in the churchyard near the centre of Llangyfelach.	26236	Tower of Church of St David and St Cyfelach, Llangyfelach
The Equatorial Observatory, Penllergare	Penllergaer; SS6226099094; 51°40′25″N 3°59′36″W	30 April 2002	Observatory	Situated some 60m NW of the Neath Port Talbot Borough Council offices in Penbwl Wood.	26500	The Equatorial Observatory, Penllergare
Scott's Pit Engine House	Birchgrove; SS6972098300; 51°40′06″N 3°53′07″W	9 October 2003	Engine House	Situated between Llansamlet and Heol-las just NE of the M4 motorway.	81848	Scott's Pit Engine House

== See also ==
- Grade I listed buildings in Swansea
- Listed buildings in Wales
- List of scheduled monuments in Swansea
- Registered historic parks and gardens in Swansea
