= Grade I listed buildings in Swansea =

Swansea shown within Wales

In the United Kingdom, the term listed building refers to a building or other structure officially designated as being of special architectural, historical, or cultural significance; Grade I structures are those considered to be "buildings of exceptional interest". Listing was begun by a provision in the Town and Country Planning Act 1947. Once listed, strict limitations are imposed on the modifications allowed to a building's structure or fittings. In Wales, the authority for listing under the Planning (Listed Buildings and Conservation Areas) Act 1990 rests with Cadw.

== Buildings ==
Name	Location Grid Ref. (Note: Sometimes known as OSGB36, the grid reference is based on the British national grid reference system used by the Ordnance Survey.) Geo-coordinates	Date Listed	Function	Notes	Reference Number	Image
Oystermouth Castle	Mumbles; SS6132288354; 51°34′37″N 4°00′10″W	23 April 1952	Ruin	Approximately 500m NW of Oystermouth church, prominently sited on high ground overlooking the village and Swansea Bay.	11518	See more images
Church of St Cadoc, Cheriton	Cheriton; SS4504893186; 51°36′58″N 4°14′22″W	3 June 1964	Church	In the hamlet of Cheriton, east of Llanmadoc. Stone churchyard wall on three sides, with iron railing, gate, and lamp arch to east. Concrete path to church door. The grave stone (renewed) of Rev WD Davies is close to porch door.	11521	See more images
Oxwich Castle	Penrice; SS4978086283; 51°33′19″N 4°10′06″W	9 June 1952	Ruin	On high ground 0.5km south of Oxwich village	11530	See more images
Penrice Castle (Mansion)	Penrice; SS4967188384; 51°34′27″N 4°10′15″W	9 June 1952	House	100m south of Penrice Castle Ancient Monument, reached by a private drive from the A4118.	11531	See more images
Weobley Castle	Llanrhidian Lower; SS4782092730; 51°36′46″N 4°11′57″W	3 June 1964	Ruin	250m north of the minor road from Oldwalls to Landimore, on a scarp overlooking Llandimore Marsh and the Burry Estuary.	11534	See more images
Swansea Castle	City centre SS6571693067; 51°37′13″N 3°56′28″W	23 April 1952	Ruin	In the centre of the city, on the curving W bank of the former course of the River Tawe.	11568	See more images
Tabernacle Chapel	Morriston; SS6695397818; 51°39′48″N 3°55′30″W	30 September 1993	Chapel	Grand chapel of 1870-72 originally known as New Libanus Chapel. Located on the north-east corner of Woodfield Street and Crown Street it is the work of architect John Humphreys and builder Daniel Edwards, both of Morriston.	11744	See more images
Guildhall	Uplands; SS6436092391; 51°36′50″N 3°57′38″W	25 July 1994	Office	Between Guildhall Road North and Guildhall Road South, to NE of Victoria Park.	14594	See more images

== See also ==
- Grade II* listed buildings in Swansea
- Listed buildings in Wales
- List of scheduled monuments in Swansea
- Registered historic parks and gardens in Swansea
