= Thomas Hancorne (1642 – 1731) =

The Reverend Thomas Hancorne
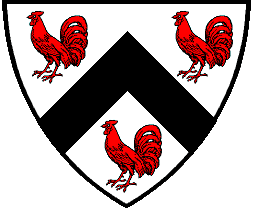
- Arms of Hancorne: Argent, a chevron Sable between three cocks Gules
- Born: 1642
- Died: February 1731 (aged 88–89)
- Education: St Alban Hall, Oxford
- Years active: 1672–1731
- Children: Richard Hancorne and others

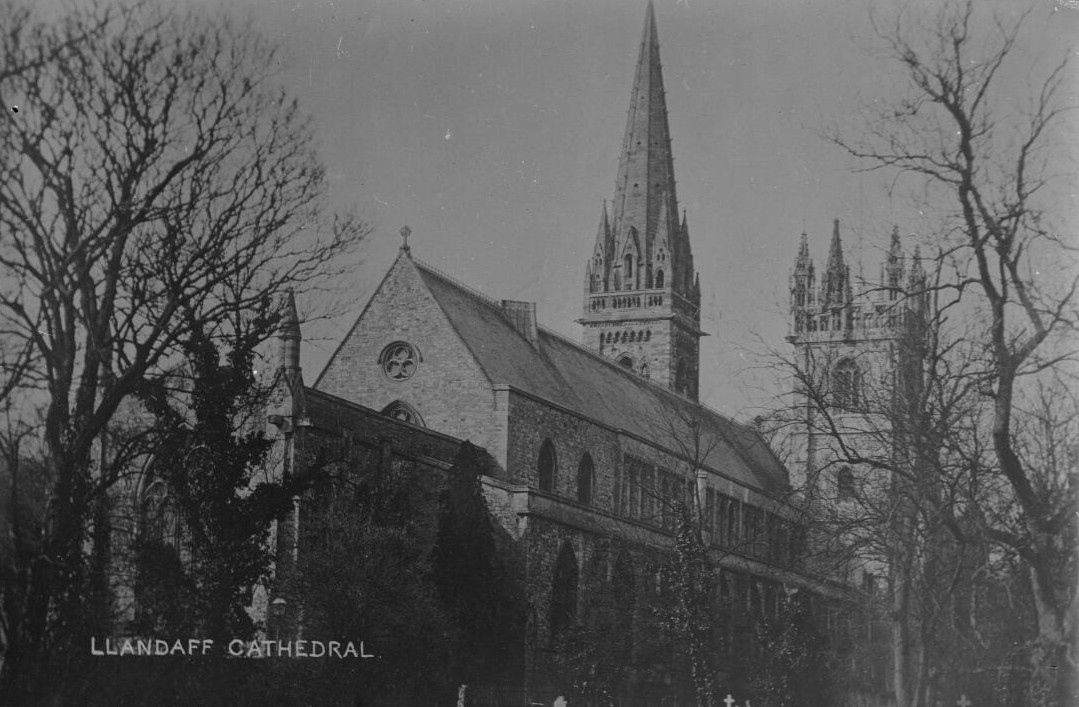
Llandaff Cathedral, photographed by Martin Ridley

Thomas Hancorne (1642 – 1731) was a Welsh clergyman and theologian whose ministry was subject to his belief in the High Church model of beliefs, practices, and rituals.

== Early life ==
Hancorne was the son of Samuel Hancorne of Aber Lleury, Breconshire by his wife Elizabeth. He matriculated at St Alban Hall, Oxford on 23 May 1667 and graduated with a B.A. on 4 March 1671. He was ordained as a priest on 3 March 1672 by Francis Davies.

== Career ==
Hancorne was given the rectorship of St Donats on 13 July 1674 and Llandow on 16 December 1681, and was appointed as the curate of Monknash on 17 November 1687. He left all these posts in 1707.

On 18 April 1710, Hancorne gave the county of Swansea's assize sermon (The right way to honour and happiness), during which he complained of the "rapid growth of deist, freethinking and anti-trinitarian views." The targets of his wrath were "irreligion, profaneness and immorality", as well as the "curious, inquisitive sceptics" and the "sin-sick tottering nation". Later, he engaged in a campaign to reassert tithe rights. The Hancorne family were involved in the "Sea Serjeants", led by Sir John Philipps, 6th Baronet.

Hancorne is commemorated for his restoration of the chancel of the Church of the Holy Trinity, Llandow in 1712.

On 17 June 1718, he was made the prebendary of Llandaff Cathedral, Prebend of St Dubritius, which he retained until his death.

== Death and legacy ==
Hancorne died in February 1731 and was buried on 28 February in Monknash. He and his wife had three children: the Rev. Thomas Hancorne, Edward Hancorne (agent and solicitor to Thomas Mansel, 1st Baron Mansel who married Elizabeth, daughter of Thomas Mansel of Penrice Castle), and the Rev. Richard Hancorne (rector of Barry and Sully).

== Sources ==
- Hancorne, Tho. (18 April 1710). The Right way to Honour and Happiness. A Sermon, Preach'd at the Assizes, Held at Cardiffe, ... April 18th, 1710. Gale ECCO. ISBN 1385401079.
- Jenkins, Philip (1984). "Church Patronage and Clerical Politics in Eighteenth-Century Glamorgan". Morgannwg. 28.
- Jenkins, Philip (March 1985). "Tory Industrialism and Town Politics: Swansea in the Eighteenth Century". The Historical Journal. 28 (1).
- Foster, Joseph (March 1985). Alumni oxoniensis : the members of the University of Oxford, 1500-1886: their parentage, birthplace, and year of birth, with a record of their degrees. Being the matriculation register of the University, alphabetically arranged, revised and annotated. Oxford and London : Parker and co. – via Internet Archive.
- Conservation Area: Llandow (2009). Vale of Glamorgan Council.
- Hancorn, Thomas (1672 - 1731) at Clergy of the Church of England Database
