= Richard Hancorn =

Richard Hancorn or Hancorne may refer to:

- Richard Hancorn (clergyman) (1727–1789), English clergyman and aristocrat
- Richard Hancorn (Royal Navy officer) (1754–1792), British Royal Navy officer
- Richard Hancorne (1687–1732), Welsh clergyman
