= St Illtyd's Church =

St Illtyd's Church may refer to any of several churches in Wales dedicated to Illtud, also known as Illtyd:

- Church of St Illtyd, Caldey Island, Pembrokeshire
- Church of St Illtyd, Llanelltyd, Gwynedd
- St Illtyd's Church, Llanhilleth, Blaenau Gwent
- Church of St Rhidian and St Illtyd, Llanrhidian, Gower, Swansea
- Church of St Illtyd, St Gwynno and St Dyfodwg, LLantrisant, Rhondda Cynon Taff
- St Illtyd's Church, Llantrithyd, Vale of Glamorgan
- St Illtyd's Church, Llantwit Major, Vale of Glamorgan
- Church of St Illtyd, Mamhilad, Monmouthshire
- St Illtyd's Church, Oxwich, Gower, Swansea
- Church of St Illtyd, Pembry, Carmarthenshire
- Church of St Illtyd, Penrice, Swansea

== See also ==
- St Illtyd, hamlet in Blaenau Gwent
