= Morgannwg =

Morgannwg may refer to:

- Glamorgan, a historic county in south Wales, called Morgannwg in Welsh
- Kingdom of Morgannwg, a medieval kingdom in the same area
- Morgannwg (journal), the journal of the Glamorgan History Society
- Iolo Morganwg (1747–1826), a Welsh antiquarian and poet

== See also ==
- Coleg Morgannwg, a former further education college in Rhondda Cynon Taf
- Glamorgan (disambiguation)
