= List of GWR 4073 Class locomotives =

Below is a list of all 171 GWR Castle Class engines, built between August 1923 and August 1950.

Five of these were converted to burn oil for a short period in the 1940s. Unlike most other locomotives so converted, they were not renumbered.

== Fleet details ==
Key to table
Scrapped	Preserved

Numbers	First Name	Second Name	Built	Withdrawn	Notes
111	Viscount Churchill	—	Sep 1924	Jul 1953	Rebuilt from 111 The Great Bear
4000	North Star	—	Nov 1929	May 1957	Rebuilt from Star Class 4000
4009 / 100 A1	Shooting Star	Lloyds	Apr 1925	May 1950	Rebuilt from Star Class 4009. Renumbered and renamed January 1936. Temporarily fitted with oil firing January 1947–September 1948. First to be withdrawn.
4016	Knight of the Golden Fleece	The Somerset Light Infantry (Prince Albert's)	Oct 1925	Sep 1951	Rebuilt from Star Class 4016. Renamed January 1938. Nameplate & crest on display at Somerset County Museum, Taunton
4032	Queen Alexandra	—	Apr 1926	Sep 1951	Rebuilt from Star Class 4032
4037	Queen Philippa	The South Wales Borderers	Jun 1926	Sep 1962	Rebuilt from Star Class 4037. Renamed March 1937
4073	Caerphilly Castle	—	Aug 1923	May 1960	Preserved at Swindon Steam Railway Museum
4074	Caldicot Castle	—	Dec 1923	May 1963	
4075	Cardiff Castle	—	Jan 1924	Nov 1961	
4076	Carmarthen Castle	—	Feb 1924	Feb 1963	
4077	Chepstow Castle	—	Feb 1924	Aug 1962	
4078	Pembroke Castle	—	Feb 1924	Jul 1962	
4079	Pendennis Castle	—	Feb 1924	May 1964	Preserved at Didcot Railway Centre
4080	Powderham Castle	—	Mar 1924	Aug 1964	
4081	Warwick Castle	—	Mar 1924	Jan 1963	
4082	Windsor Castle	7013 Bristol Castle	Apr 1924	Sep 1964	Hauled the funeral train at the state funeral of George V, 1936. Swapped name and number with 7013 Bristol Castle in February 1952
4083	Abbotsbury Castle	—	May 1925	Dec 1961	
4084	Aberystwyth Castle	—	May 1925	Oct 1960	
4085	Berkeley Castle	—	May 1925	May 1962	Struck and killed GWR Chief Mechanical Engineer George Churchward on 19 December 1933
4086	Builth Castle	—	Jun 1925	Apr 1962	
4087	Cardigan Castle	—	Jun 1925	Oct 1963	
4088	Dartmouth Castle	—	Jul 1925	May 1964	
4089	Donnington Castle	—	Jul 1925	Sep 1964	
4090	Dorchester Castle	—	Jul 1925	Jun 1963	
4091	Dudley Castle	—	Jul 1925	Jan 1959	First ‘new-built’ Castle to be withdrawn
4092	Dunraven Castle	—	Aug 1925	Dec 1961	
4093	Dunster Castle	—	May 1926	Sep 1964	
4094	Dynevor Castle	—	May 1926	Mar 1962	
4095	Harlech Castle	—	Jun 1926	Dec 1962	
4096	Highclere Castle	—	Jun 1926	Jan 1963	
4097	Kenilworth Castle	—	Jun 1926	May 1960	
4098	Kidwelly Castle	—	Jul 1926	Dec 1963	
4099	Kilgerran Castle	—	Aug 1926	Sep 1962	Real castle's name spelled Cilgerran Castle
5000	Launceston Castle	—	Sep 1926	Oct 1964	
5001	Llandovery Castle	—	Sep 1926	Feb 1963	
5002	Ludlow Castle	—	Sep 1926	Sep 1964	
5003	Lulworth Castle	—	May 1927	Aug 1962	
5004	Llanstephan Castle	—	Jun 1927	Apr 1962	Used in the 1936 movie "The Last Journey" Also appears in 1949 Ealing Studios movie 'Run for your Money'
5005	Manorbier Castle	—	Jun 1927	Feb 1960	This is the only Castle Class to carry streamlining but this was experimental'
5006	Tregenna Castle	—	Jun 1927	Apr 1962	
5007	Rougemont Castle	—	Jun 1927	Sep 1962	
5008	Raglan Castle	—	Jun 1927	Sep 1962	
5009	Shrewsbury Castle	—	Jun 1927	Oct 1960	
5010	Restormel Castle	—	Jul 1927	Oct 1959	
5011	Tintagel Castle	—	Jul 1927	Sep 1962	
5012	Berry Pomeroy Castle	—	Jul 1927	Apr 1962	
5013	Abergavenny Castle	—	Jun 1932	Jul 1962	
5014	Goodrich Castle	—	Jun 1932	Feb 1965	
5015	Kingswear Castle	—	Jul 1932	Apr 1963	
5016	Montgomery Castle	—	Jul 1932	Sep 1962	
5017	St. Donat's Castle	The Gloucestershire Regiment 28th 61st	Jul 1932	Sep 1962	Renamed April 1954
5018	St Mawes Castle	—	Jul 1932	Mar 1964	
5019	Treago Castle	—	Jul 1932	Sep 1962	
5020	Trematon Castle	—	Jul 1932	Nov 1962	
5021	Whittington Castle	—	Aug 1932	Sep 1962	
5022	Wigmore Castle	—	Aug 1932	Jun 1963	
5023	Brecon Castle	—	Apr 1934	Feb 1963	
5024	Carew Castle	—	Apr 1934	May 1962	
5025	Chirk Castle	—	Apr 1934	Nov 1963	
5026	Criccieth Castle	—	Apr 1934	Nov 1964	
5027	Farleigh Castle	—	Apr 1934	Nov 1962	
5028	Llantilio Castle	—	May 1934	May 1960	
5029	Nunney Castle	—	May 1934	Dec 1963	Preserved - Operated on the main line by Icons of Steam
5030	Shirburn Castle	—	May 1934	Sep 1962	
5031	Totnes Castle	—	May 1934	Oct 1963	
5032	Usk Castle	—	May 1934	Sep 1962	
5033	Broughton Castle	—	May 1935	Sep 1962	
5034	Corfe Castle	—	May 1935	Sep 1962	
5035	Coity Castle	—	May 1935	May 1962	
5036	Lyonshall Castle	—	May 1935	Sep 1962	
5037	Monmouth Castle	—	May 1935	Mar 1964	
5038	Morlais Castle	—	Jun 1935	Sep 1963	
5039	Rhuddlan Castle	—	Jun 1935	Jun 1964	Temporarily fitted with oil firing December 1946–September 1948.
5040	Stokesay Castle	—	Jun 1935	Oct 1963	
5041	Tiverton Castle	—	Jul 1935	Dec 1963	
5042	Winchester Castle	—	Jul 1935	Jun 1965	
5043	Barbury Castle	Earl of Mount Edgcumbe	Mar 1936	Dec 1963	Renamed September 1937. Preserved
5044	Beverston Castle	Earl of Dunraven	Mar 1936	Apr 1962	Renamed September 1937
5045	Bridgwater Castle	Earl of Dudley	Mar 1936	Sep 1962	Renamed September 1937
5046	Clifford Castle	Earl Cawdor	Apr 1936	Sep 1962	Renamed August 1937
5047	Compton Castle	Earl of Dartmouth	Apr 1936	Sep 1962	Renamed August 1937
5048	Cranbrook Castle	Earl of Devon	Apr 1936	Aug 1962	Renamed August 1937
5049	Denbigh Castle	Earl of Plymouth	Apr 1936	Mar 1963	Renamed August 1937
5050	Devizes Castle	Earl of St Germans	May 1936	Aug 1963	Renamed August 1937
5051	Drysllwyn Castle	Earl Bathurst	May 1936	May 1963	Renamed August 1937. Preserved at Didcot Railway Centre. Carries either name, alternately.
5052	Eastnor Castle	Earl of Radnor	May 1936	Sep 1962	Renamed July 1937
5053	Bishop's Castle	Earl Cairns	May 1936	Jul 1962	Renamed August 1937
5054	Lamphey Castle	Earl of Ducie	Jun 1936	Nov 1964	Renamed September 1937
5055	Lydford Castle	Earl of Eldon	Jun 1936	Oct 1964	Renamed August 1937
5056	Ogmore Castle	Earl of Powis	Jun 1936	Nov 1964	Renamed September 1937
5057	Penrice Castle	Earl Waldegrave	Jun 1936	Mar 1964	Renamed October 1937
5058	Newport Castle	Earl of Clancarty	May 1937	Mar 1963	Renamed September 1937
5059	Powis Castle	Earl St Aldwyn	May 1937	Jun 1962	Renamed October 1937
5060	Sarum Castle	Earl of Berkeley	Jun 1937	Apr 1963	Renamed October 1937
5061	Sudeley Castle	Earl of Birkenhead	Jun 1937	Sep 1962	Renamed October 1937
5062	Tenby Castle	Earl of Shaftesbury	Jun 1937	Aug 1962	Renamed November 1937
5063	Thornbury Castle	Earl Baldwin	Jun 1937	Feb 1965	Renamed July 1937
5064	Tretower Castle	Bishop's Castle	Jun 1937	Sep 1962	Renamed September 1937
5065	Upton Castle	Newport Castle	Jul 1937	Jan 1963	Renamed September 1937
5066	Wardour Castle	Sir Felix Pole	Jul 1937	Sep 1962	Renamed April 1956
5067	St Fagans Castle	—	Jul 1937	Jul 1962	
5068	Beverston Castle	—	Jun 1938	Sep 1962	
5069	Isambard Kingdom Brunel	—	Jun 1938	Feb 1962	
5070	Sir Daniel Gooch	—	Jun 1938	Mar 1964	
5071	Clifford Castle	Spitfire	Jun 1938	Oct 1963	Renamed September 1940
5072	Compton Castle	Hurricane	Jun 1938	Oct 1962	Renamed November 1940
5073	Cranbrook Castle	Blenheim	Jul 1938	Mar 1964	Renamed January 1941
5074	Denbigh Castle	Hampden	Jul 1938	May 1964	Renamed January 1941
5075	Devizes Castle	Wellington	Aug 1938	Sep 1962	Renamed October 1940
5076	Drysllwyn Castle	Gladiator	Aug 1938	Sep 1964	Renamed January 1941
5077	Eastnor Castle	Fairey Battle	Aug 1938	Jul 1962	Renamed October 1940
5078	Lamphey Castle	Beaufort	May 1939	Nov 1962	Renamed January 1941
5079	Lydford Castle	Lysander	May 1939	May 1960	Renamed November 1940. Temporarily fitted with oil firing January 1947–October 1948.
5080	Ogmore Castle	Defiant	May 1939	Apr 1963	Renamed January 1941. Preserved
5081	Penrice Castle	Lockheed Hudson	May 1939	Oct 1963	Renamed January 1941
5082	Powis Castle	Swordfish	Jun 1939	Jul 1962	Renamed January 1941
5083	Bath Abbey	—	Jun 1937	Jan 1959	Rebuilt from Star Class 4063. Temporarily fitted with oil firing December 1946–November 1948.
5084	Reading Abbey	—	Apr 1937	Jul 1962	Rebuilt from Star Class 4064
5085	Evesham Abbey	—	Jul 1939	Feb 1964	Rebuilt from Star Class 4065
5086	Viscount Horne	—	Dec 1937	Nov 1958	Rebuilt from Star Class 4066
5087	Tintern Abbey	—	Nov 1940	Aug 1963	Rebuilt from Star Class 4067
5088	Llanthony Abbey	—	Feb 1939	Sep 1962	Rebuilt from Star Class 4068
5089	Westminster Abbey	—	Oct 1939	Sep 1964	Rebuilt from Star Class 4069
5090	Neath Abbey	—	Apr 1939	May 1962	Rebuilt from Star Class 4070
5091	Cleeve Abbey	—	Dec 1938	Oct 1964	Rebuilt from Star Class 4071. Temporarily fitted with oil firing October 1946–November 1948.
5092	Tresco Abbey	—	Apr 1938	Jul 1963	Rebuilt from Star Class 4072
5093	Upton Castle	—	Jun 1939	Sep 1963	
5094	Tretower Castle	—	Jun 1939	Sep 1962	
5095	Barbury Castle	—	Jun 1939	Aug 1962	
5096	Bridgwater Castle	—	Jun 1939	Jun 1964	
5097	Sarum Castle	—	Jul 1939	Mar 1963	
5098	Clifford Castle	—	May 1946	Jun 1964	
5099	Compton Castle	—	May 1946	Feb 1963	
7000	Viscount Portal	—	May 1946	Dec 1963	
7001	Denbigh Castle	Sir James Milne	May 1946	Sep 1963	Renamed February 1948
7002	Devizes Castle	—	Jun 1946	Mar 1964	
7003	Elmley Castle	—	Jun 1946	Aug 1964	
7004	Eastnor Castle	—	Jun 1946	Jan 1964	
7005	Lamphey Castle	Sir Edward Elgar	Jun 1946	Sep 1964	Renamed August 1957
7006	Lydford Castle	—	Jun 1946	Dec 1963	
7007	Ogmore Castle	Great Western	Jul 1946	Feb 1963	Renamed January 1948
7008	Swansea Castle	—	May 1948	Sep 1964	
7009	Athelney Castle	—	May 1948	Mar 1963	
7010	Avondale Castle	—	Jun 1948	Mar 1964	
7011	Banbury Castle	—	Jun 1948	Feb 1965	
7012	Barry Castle	—	Jun 1948	Nov 1964	
7013	Bristol Castle	4082 Windsor Castle	Jul 1948	Feb 1965	Swapped name and number with 4082 Windsor Castle and hauled the funeral train at the state funeral of George VI in February 1952.
7014	Caerhays Castle	—	Jul 1948	Feb 1965	
7015	Carn Brea Castle	—	Jul 1948	Apr 1963	
7016	Chester Castle	—	Aug 1948	Nov 1962	
7017	G. J. Churchward	—	Aug 1948	Feb 1963	Only Castle class name with full stops
7018	Drysllwyn Castle	—	May 1949	Sep 1963	
7019	Fowey Castle	—	May 1949	Sep 1964	
7020	Gloucester Castle	—	May 1949	Sep 1963	
7021	Haverfordwest Castle	—	Jun 1949	Sep 1963	
7022	Hereford Castle	—	Jun 1949	Jun 1965	
7023	Penrice Castle	—	Jun 1949	Feb 1965	
7024	Powis Castle	—	Jun 1949	Feb 1965	
7025	Sudeley Castle	—	Aug 1949	Sep 1964	
7026	Tenby Castle	—	Aug 1949	Oct 1964	
7027	Thornbury Castle	—	Aug 1949	Dec 1963	Preserved
7028	Cadbury Castle	—	May 1950	Dec 1963	
7029	Clun Castle	—	May 1950	Dec 1965	Last Castle to be withdrawn. Preserved
7030	Cranbrook Castle	—	Jun 1950	Feb 1963	
7031	Cromwell's Castle	—	Jun 1950	Jul 1963	
7032	Denbigh Castle	—	Jun 1950	Sep 1964	
7033	Hartlebury Castle	—	Jul 1950	Jan 1963	
7034	Ince Castle	—	Aug 1950	Jun 1965	
7035	Ogmore Castle	—	Aug 1950	Aug 1965	
7036	Taunton Castle	—	Aug 1950	Sep 1963	
7037	Swindon	—	Aug 1950	Mar 1963	
