= 7028 =

7028 may refer to:

- The year in the 8th millennium
- 7028 'Cadbury Castle', a steam locomotive
- 7028 Tachikawa, an asteroid
