= Dorchester Friary =

Coordinates: 50.7173°N 2.4355°W

Dorchester Friary, also known as Dorchester Priory, was a Franciscan friary formerly located in Dorchester, Dorset, England.

The friary stood on the north side of the town (grid reference SY693909), on the banks of the River Frome, a little east of the site of Dorchester Castle. Possibly a royal foundation, it was in existence by 1267, and it was dissolved in 1538.

In 1296, the establishment is recorded as being home to 32 friars. In the course of its existence it received legacies and gifts from such notable people as Thomas Bitton, Bishop of Exeter; Elizabeth de Clare; and John de Waltham, Bishop of Salisbury. The Hospital of St John the Baptist in Dorchester was placed in their care by King Richard III of England, even though his predecessor, Henry VI, had given it to Eton College. The friars' other properties included profitable local watermills, barns and gardens. In 1485, in return for his generosity to the friary, Sir John Byconil was recognised as "chief founder" and it was agreed that henceforth boys newly admitted to the order would be known as "Byconil's Friars".

Richard Yngworth, the newly appointed Bishop of Dover, had the task of dissolving the friary and seizing its assets on behalf of King Henry VIII of England, and the long-standing warden, Dr William Germen, eventually signed the deed of surrender at the end of September 1538. Edmund Peckham, a cofferer in the King's Household, purchased the buildings and land and sold them on to Thomas Wriothesley, 1st Earl of Southampton in 1547. The estate later passed into the hands of Denzil Holles, MP, who had married Dorothy Ashley, a Dorset heiress, whose father, Sir Francis Ashley, had bought it from Southampton. Ashley had made many alterations to the house Holles' son, Francis Holles, 2nd Baron Holles, was born there in 1627. When the Holles barony became extinct, the estate passed to John Holles, 1st Duke of Newcastle. The house was described by James Savage in his 1837 History of Dorchester as having been standing "a few years ago". Savage described it as "a long low and irregular building; the eastern part seemed to be the most ancient by three old windows. At the West end there was a long gallery perhaps once a dormitory."
