= Glamorgan (disambiguation) =

Glamorgan is a historic county in South Wales. At earlier points in history "Glamorgan" may refer to one of the following:

- The Kingdom of Glamorgan
- The Lordship of Glamorgan

Glamorgan may also refer to:

== Education ==
- The University of Glamorgan
- Glamorgan (The Toorak Preparatory Grammar School), a prep school affiliated with Geelong Church of England Grammar School

== Places ==
=== Australia ===
- Glamorgan-Spring Bay Council, the municipality covering the southern east coast of Tasmania, Australia
- Municipality of Glamorgan, former municipality

=== Canada ===
- Glamorgan, Calgary, a neighbourhood of Calgary, Alberta, Canada

=== Trinidad and Tobago ===
- Glamorgan, Tobago, a village in Tobago, Trinidad and Tobago

=== United Kingdom ===
- Glamorganshire (UK Parliament constituency), 1536–1885
  - East Glamorganshire (UK Parliament constituency), 1885–1918
  - Mid Glamorganshire (UK Parliament constituency), 1885–1918
  - South Glamorganshire (UK Parliament constituency), 1885–1918

=== United States ===
- Glamorgan (Deer Park, Maryland), listed on the NRHP in Maryland
- Glamorgan (Alliance, Ohio), listed on the NRHP in Stark County, Ohio
- Glamorgan, Virginia

== Ships ==
- HMS Glamorgan (D19), a Royal Navy County-class destroyer, launched in 1964 and decommissioned in 1986
- SS Glamorgan Coast, which ran aground off Cape Cornwall in 1932.

== Sport ==
- Glamorgan Wanderers RFC, a rugby union club based in Cardiff, Wales
- Glamorgan County RFC, a rugby union invitational team based in South Wales
- Glamorgan County Silver Ball Trophy, a rugby union tournament
- Glamorgan County Cricket Club, a county cricket team representing the County of Glamorgan

== See also ==
- Morgannwg (disambiguation)
