= Dorchester Castle =

Coordinates: 50.717°N 2.437°W

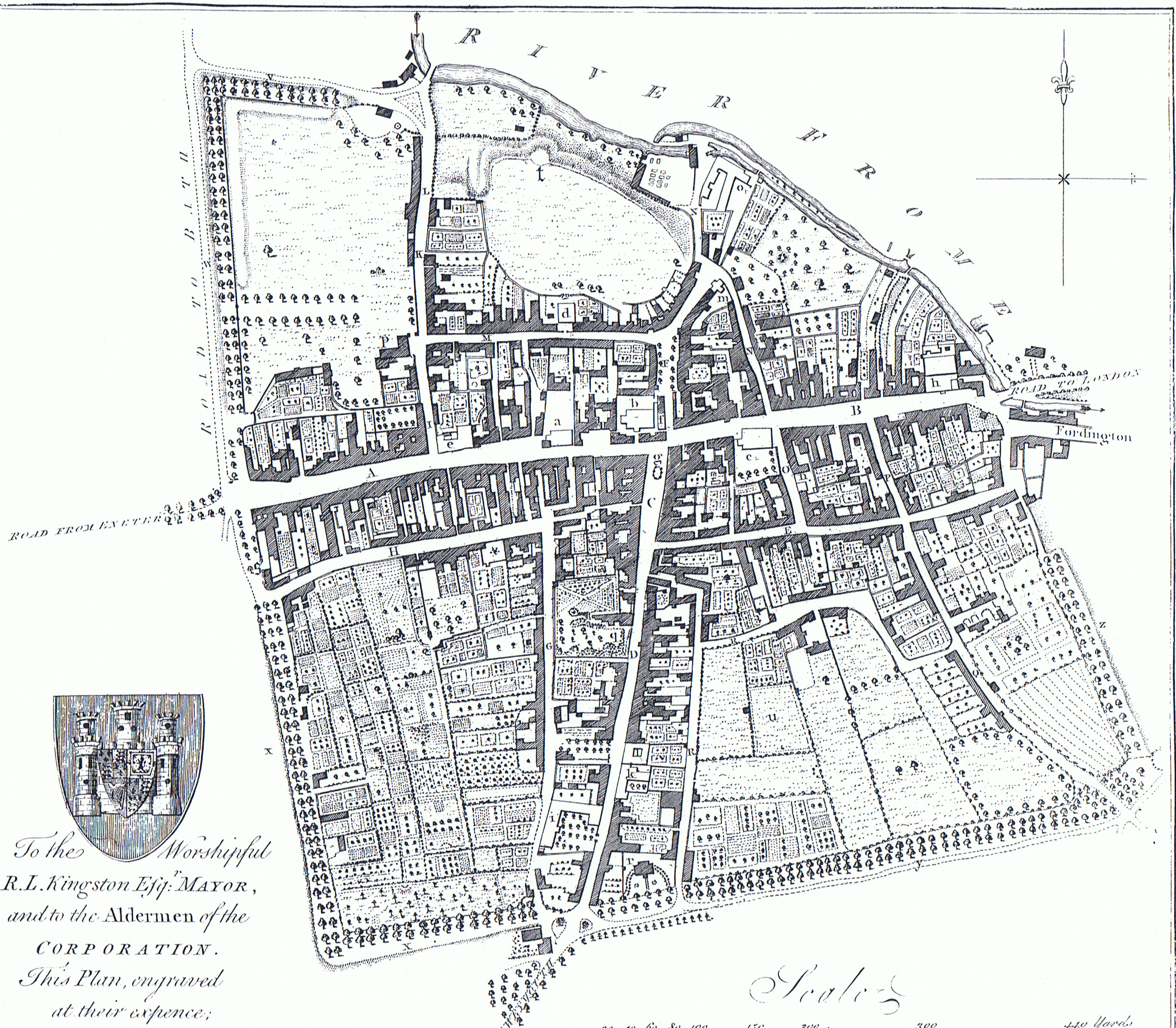
A 1771 map of Dorchester, showing the green where the castle once stood at the north of the town.

Dorchester Castle was a motte and bailey castle in the market town of Dorchester, Dorset, southern England (grid reference SY692909).

== History ==
The date that the castle was built is unclear. Between 1154 and 1175 it was in possession of the Earl of Cornwall and it had become a royal possession by 1185. Both Henry III and John spent money on the castle. It appears to have been disused from about 1290 and there are references to its stonework being reused by the Chidlock family to build Dorchester Greyfriars in 1309. Certainly it was abandoned by 1422.

Dorchester Prison occupies its site – originally to the north of the town, with a Franciscan Priory further east, but nothing of the castle or the priory remain. However, in 1720, two underground passages were discovered while building a chapel: these once connected the castle to the town proper. In the 1800s, a bastion-like rampart still existed, and a small rampart and ditch were visible on the north and east sides. The gatehouse was built in 1790 and has been designated as a Grade II listed building.

Great Western Railway Castle-class locomotive No. 4090 was named after the castle.

== Governors ==
There are some records of people associated with the castle:

- 1216–17 – John Marshall, Earl of Pembroke was appointed governor
- 1270 – William Belet was granted the castle along with a park
