= Do not go gentle festival =

Arts festival in Wales

Do Not Go Gentle festival was an annual arts festival, founded in 2012, that takes place in the Uplands suburb of Swansea, Wales, which is famous for being the birthplace of Welsh poet Dylan Thomas. It was founded by Pierre Davies and inspired by Ireland's Dylan Thomas Literary Weekend in County Clare and he wanted to honor the Welsh poet with a festival closer to his home.

The festival is held over 3 days and took its name from his poem "Do not go gentle into that good night". Among the festival's locations is the poet's former home at 5 Cwmdonkin Drive and the festival launched just ahead of his centennial.

The festival concentrates on literature and music, but also features theatre, film, and art. According to the founder, the event is curated with the idea that "[i]t's a festival Dylan might have liked". The program is mainly made up of Welsh musicians, poets, and writers, but has also featured acts from as far afield as Ireland, Denmark and Brittany.
