= John David Davies =

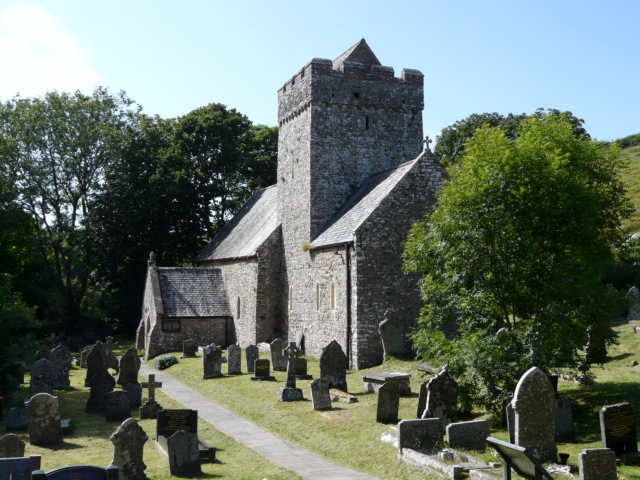
St Cadoc's Church, Cheriton

John David Davies (14 January 1831 – 30 September 1911) was a Welsh priest. His father was John Davies (1834–1873), Rector of Reynoldston. As a young man he studied at Trinity College, Dublin, graduating first with a B.A., and then with an M.A. in 1859. He was ordained deacon in 1855, and priest in 1856. In 1860 he was appointed Rector of Llanmadoc, and of Cheriton in 1867, holding both appointments until his death in 1911. One of his favourite pastimes was wood carving, and he was responsible for much of the carving present in the churches of Cheriton, Llanmadoc, Llangennith, and Llanrhidian.

His written works include a study of the history of the Gower (which was published in four volumes), A History of West Gower (Swansea, 1877–94), and the essay, "A Few Words on Non-communicating Attendance" (Swansea, 1879).
