= Church of St Illtyd, Penrice =

Church in Oxwich, south-west Wales

Coordinates: 51°33′15″N 4°09′32″W

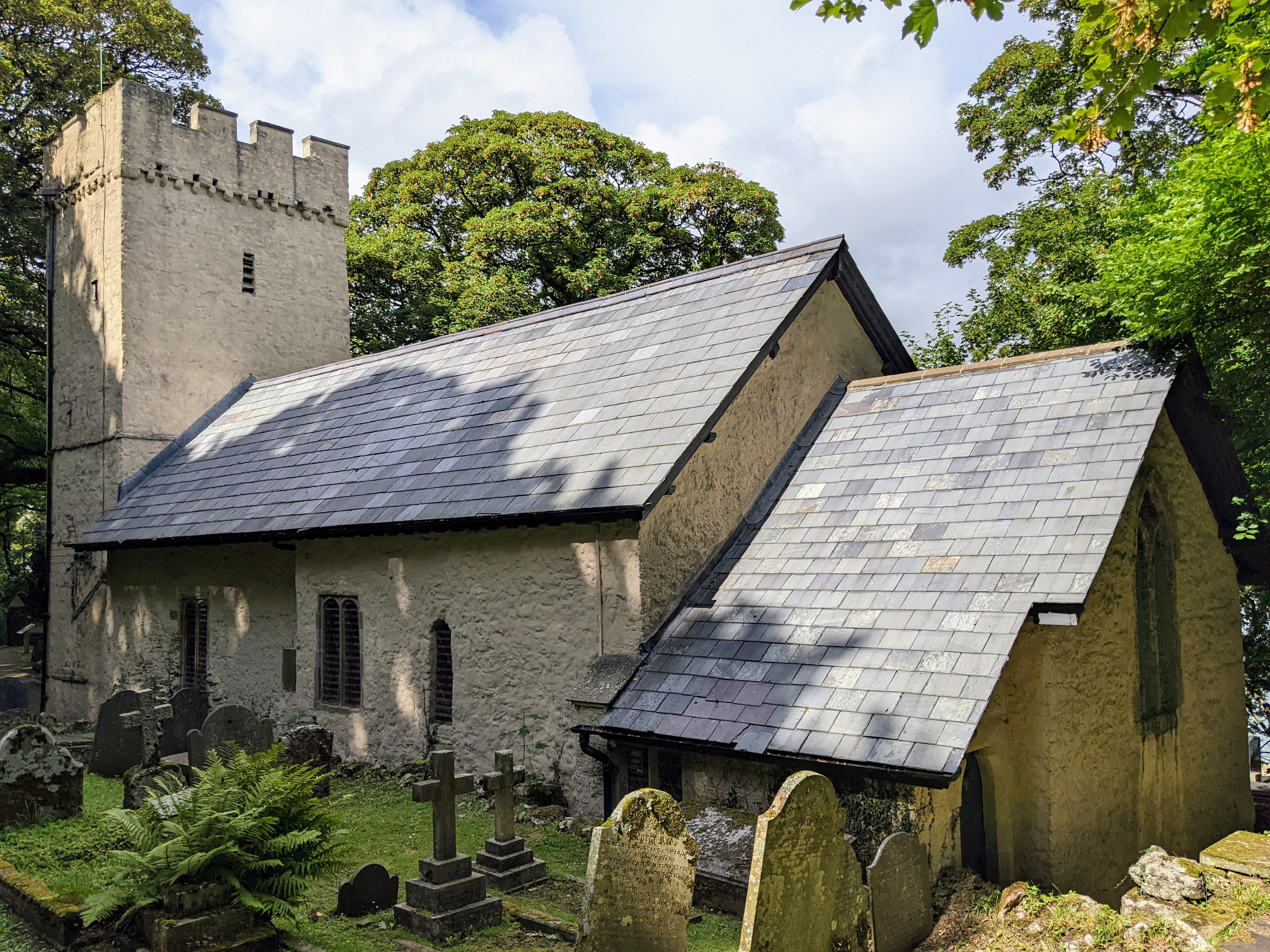
St Illtyd

The Church of St Illtyd is a Grade II* listed building in the city and county of Swansea in south Wales. It is close to Oxwich village, on a site overlooking Oxwich Bay and reached by the Wales Coast Path. It has a square churchyard with a stone wall and a modern gate. The church was originally listed on 6 March 1964. The church was originally dedicated to Hylledd, and no reason is known as to why it was changed.

Illtud is venerated as the founder-abbot and teacher of the divinity school known as Cor Tewdws, located in Llanilltud Fawr (Llantwit Major) in the county of Glamorgan. He founded the monastery and college in the 6th century, and the school is believed to be Britain's earliest centre of learning. His feast day and commemoration is celebrated on 6 November. There are many churches throughout Wales and Brittany dedicated to St Illtyd.

A Celtic Church stood on this site before it was demolished and a wooden, Christian church was built in the first half of the 5th century. The first written reference to this church, however, only dates back to the 9th or 10th century. The round church yard is indicative of this early Celtic period.

The Church was rebuilt by the sheep farming Cistercian monks in the late 12th century, and most of what we can see today dates back to this period. In 1957 the church was closed due to opencast coal working in the vicinity.
