= St Cadoc's Church, Cheriton =

Church in Cheriton, Wales

Coordinates: 51.3658°N 4.1422°W

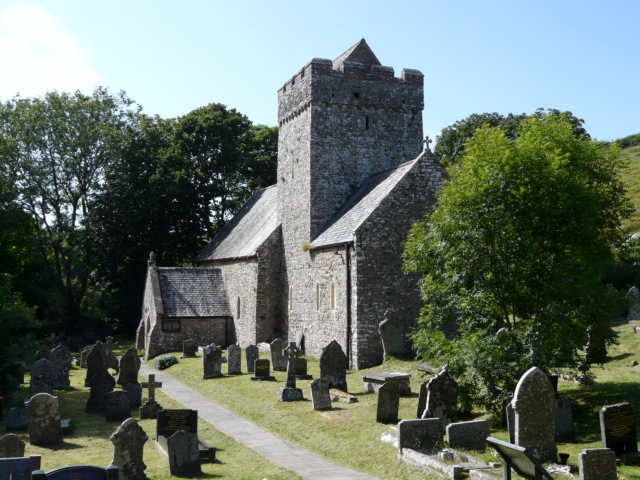
Church of St Cadoc

The Church of St Cadoc, sometimes referred to as "The Cathedral of Gower", is a Grade I listed building and an Anglican church located in the hamlet of Cheriton on the north side of the Gower Peninsula, Wales, United Kingdom.

The present church was built in the 13th century and is believed to have replaced an earlier church within the manor of Landimore. Restoration was carried out on two occasions in the 19th century and again in 1934. The font may have been salvaged from the earlier church which was abandoned because of the encroaching sea.

== The original church ==
The first church in the district is supposed to have been built by the family of Payn de Turberville, who granted it to the Knights Hospitallers of St John at Slebech in about 1165. The exact site of the earlier church is uncertain. The name "Cheriton" derives from "church town", but this name is thought to have been given in recognition of the new church.

== The present church ==
The church has a saddleback roof with a defensive intent. The interior of the church contained medieval wall paintings, including scriptural quotations and vine-leaf patterns, but these were destroyed during the Victorian era. Eighteenth-century maps show the church in its present location, near a mill, which went out of use in the 19th century, and "Great House", which was demolished at a similar date.

In the 1840s, Rev W. L. Collins had the original pews removed, and installed a new window, which was itself replaced during the restoration of the mid-1870s, carried out by Rev J. D. Davies, the Rector of Llanmadoc and author of A History of West Gower. Diocesan architect John Prichard was involved in this work, as he was in numerous other restorations of the period.
