= St Andrew's Church, Penrice =

- Church of St Andrew, Penrice
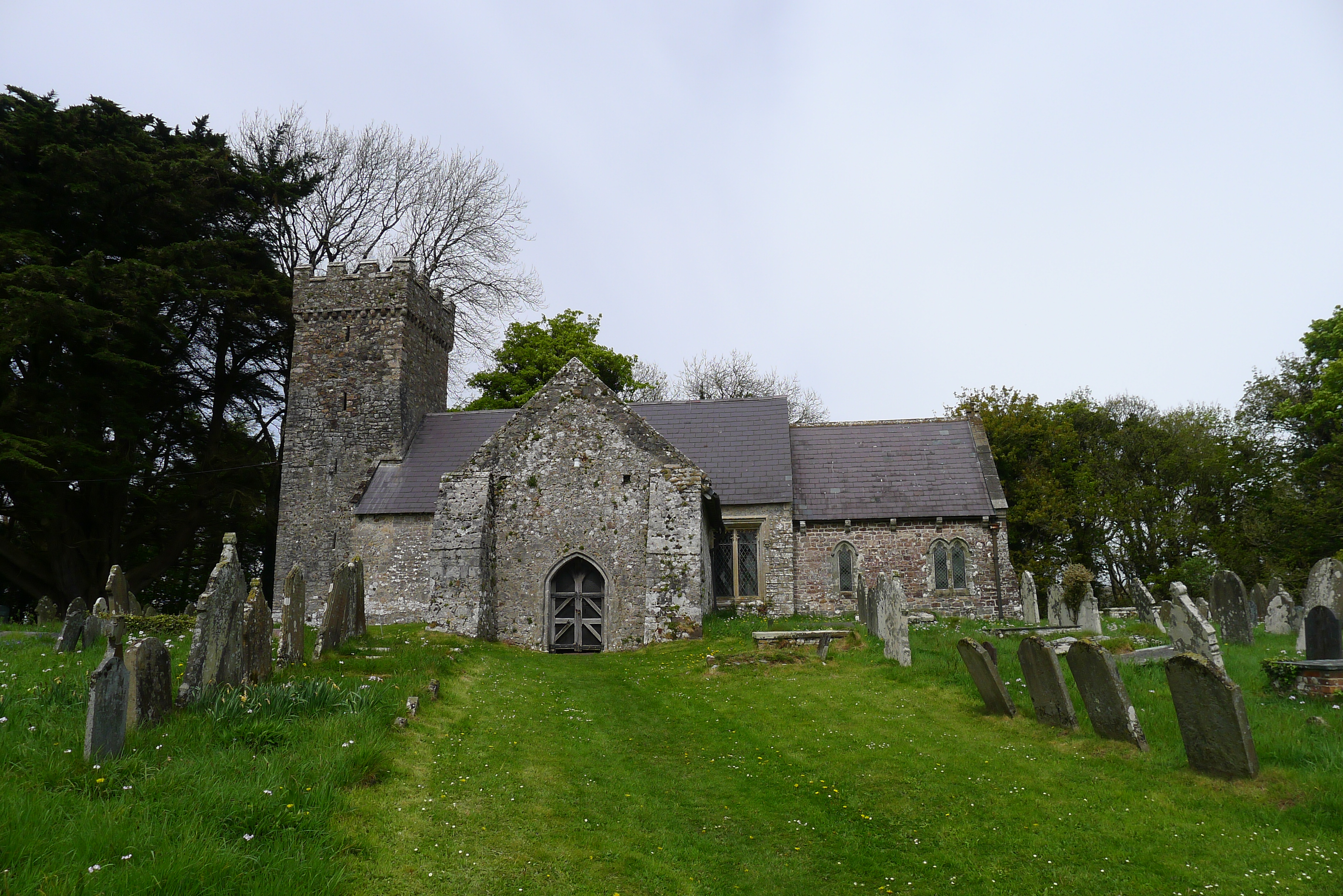
- "a conservatively restored medieval church of interesting form"

- Location in the County of Swansea
- 51.5701°N 4.1757°W
- Location: Penrice, Swansea
- Country: Wales
- Denomination: Church in Wales

History
- Status: Active
- Founded: 12th century
- Dedication: Saint Andrew

Architecture
- Heritage designation: Grade II*
- Designated: 3 June 1964
- Architectural type: Church

Specifications
- Materials: Stone, slate roof

The Church of St Andrew, Penrice, Swansea, Wales dates from the 12th century. A Grade II* listed building, St Andrew's remains an active parish church in the parish of South-West Gower, in the Diocese of Swansea and Brecon.

== History and description ==
The church is dedicated to St Andrew, and was begun in the early 12th century. Later in that century, it was gifted by the de Penrice family, who had gained lands in Gower during the Norman invasion of Wales, to the Order of Knights Hospitaller at Slebech. In the 19th century the church was restored by Elizabeth Talbot of Penrice Castle. The church remains an active parish church in the Diocese of Swansea and Brecon.

The church is "large by Gower standards", and is constructed in a mix of local Red sandstone and limestone. Cruciform in plan, it comprises a tower, nave, chancel and two transepts. John Newman, in his Glamorgan volume of the Buildings of Wales Pevsner, describes these as the church's "most remarkable feature", noting their considerable width and depth. The porch transept was used for the conduct of parish business in the medieval period, and subsequently as a schoolroom. The church is a Grade II* listed building, its Cadw listing record describing it as "a conservatively restored medieval church of interesting form".

In the churchyard stands the grave of Captain Sir Christopher Cole RN KCB, who married into the Talbot family. (Note: Cole, who served as M.P. for Glamorgan, is chiefly remembered for his seizure of the Banda Islands from the Dutch in 1810.) His monument is an early example of Celtic Revival sculpture, dating from 1836.

== Sources ==
- Newman, John (1995). Glamorgan. The Buildings of Wales. London, UK: Penguin. ISBN 0140710566.
