= Whiteford Lighthouse =

Former lighthouse in Gower, Wales

Whiteford Point Lighthouse
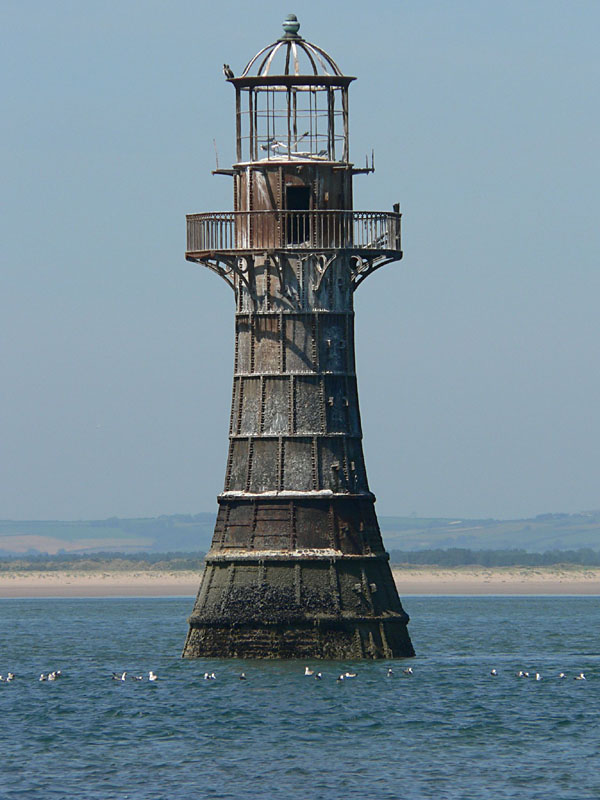
- Whiteford Point Lighthouse in 2006
- Location: Whiteford Point; Gower Peninsula; Loughor; Wales
- Coordinates: 51.652587°N 4.251092°W

Tower
- Constructed: 1854 (first)
- Foundation: wooden piles
- Construction: cast iron tower
- Automated: 1919 (gas)
- Height: 13.5 metres (44 ft)
- Shape: tapered cylindrical tower with balcony and lantern
- Markings: originally black (bitumen coated)
- Operator: Carmarthenshire County Council
- Heritage: Grade II* listed building, scheduled monument, National Monuments of Wales

Light
- First lit: 1865 (current)
- Deactivated: 1926
- Range: 7 nautical miles (13 km; 8.1 mi)

Whiteford Point Lighthouse (also known as Whitford Point Lighthouse) is located off the coast at Whiteford Point near Whiteford Sands, on the Gower Peninsula, South Wales.

== Description ==
It is an unusual cast-iron lighthouse built in 1865 to a design by John Bowen (1825–1873) of Llanelli, by the Llanelli Harbour and Burry Navigation Commissioners to mark the shoals of Whiteford Point, replacing an earlier piled structure of 1854, of which nothing remains. It is the only wave-swept cast-iron tower of this size in Britain. The tower is 44 feet (13 m) high and stands just above low-water level. The base is about 24 feet (7.3 m) in diameter and rises to a diameter of 11 feet 6 inches (3.51 m) at lantern level. A pitched stone apron surrounds the base of the lighthouse.

== Construction and maintenance ==
The lighthouse sits on 88 wooden piles driven into glacial moraine. These are linked horizontally by walling pieces, using 500 cast-iron plants and bolts. These would have formed a box, probably square or octagonal, which would have been excavated and partially filled with concrete. The materials were delivered by boat and work undertaken during low tide.

The structure of the shell is formed from 105 bent and tapered cast-iron plates, each about 32 millimetres (1.3 in) thick, with an upstand flange on each side, and bolted with cast-iron bolts, each weighing 2 pounds (0.91 kg). There are eight levels of panel tapering to the sixth 'course'. The first three horizontal joints are covered by iron bands supported on brackets and topped with fillets of concrete.

During the 1870s vertical cracks developed in the plates of the lowest three rings. A local blacksmith called Powell made wrought-iron straps which were bolted to the flanges on each side of the cracked plates. At the time, the cracks were put down to lateral pressures arising from the settlement of the inner masonry, being composed of rough beach stones and 'bad' mortar. By 1884, 150 straps had been fitted. The compaction of the fill may have been compounded by movement (swaying) of the tower, reported in 1884 by the lighthouse keeper to have been 'several inches'. In 1885, the ground around the tower was strengthened with the addition of a concrete skirt 18 inches (46 cm) deep, bound by a 2-inch (5.1 cm) wide iron band, effectively anchoring the skirt to the base of the tower.

The equipment for the lighthouse is listed in an inventory of 1888 and indicates that provision was made for two lighthouse keepers, although each of the census returns of 1871, 1881, 1891, and 1901 names one keeper. The working pattern was two weeks at Whitford Lighthouse alternating with two weeks at Llanelli Harbour Lighthouse.

== The lamp ==
Three Argand lamps and reflectors were fitted, one towards the Lynch Pool or south channel, one towards Burry Port, and one towards Llanelli. In 1876, the Harbour Master set a fourth lamp to shine west along the north channel. The Admiralty chart of 1887 shows the "Arc of Visibility" of the lights from slightly west of south, through north, to slightly south of east.

The lighthouse was discontinued in 1920, when responsibility for the light was transferred to Trinity House, who decided to establish a new beacon at Burry Holms. However, after pleas from local yachtsmen, the light was relit in the 1980s. This gave an additional point of reference when navigating the waters between the Gower Peninsula and Burry Port: on dark nights, boat crews often found themselves on top of Whiteford Point before realizing the fact. The cost was £1,300, with £1,000 being funded by the Harbour Commissioners and the balance by Burry Port Yacht Club. The new light was fully automatic and switched on when daylight faded to a pre-determined level. Two nautical almanacs published in 1987, Reeds, and Macmillan and Silk Cut, listed Whiteford Lighthouse as flashing every five seconds.

After a failure of the solar unit, the light was removed and not replaced. However, the lighthouse still has navigational value in daylight. It is now owned by Carmarthenshire County Council.

== Historical significance ==
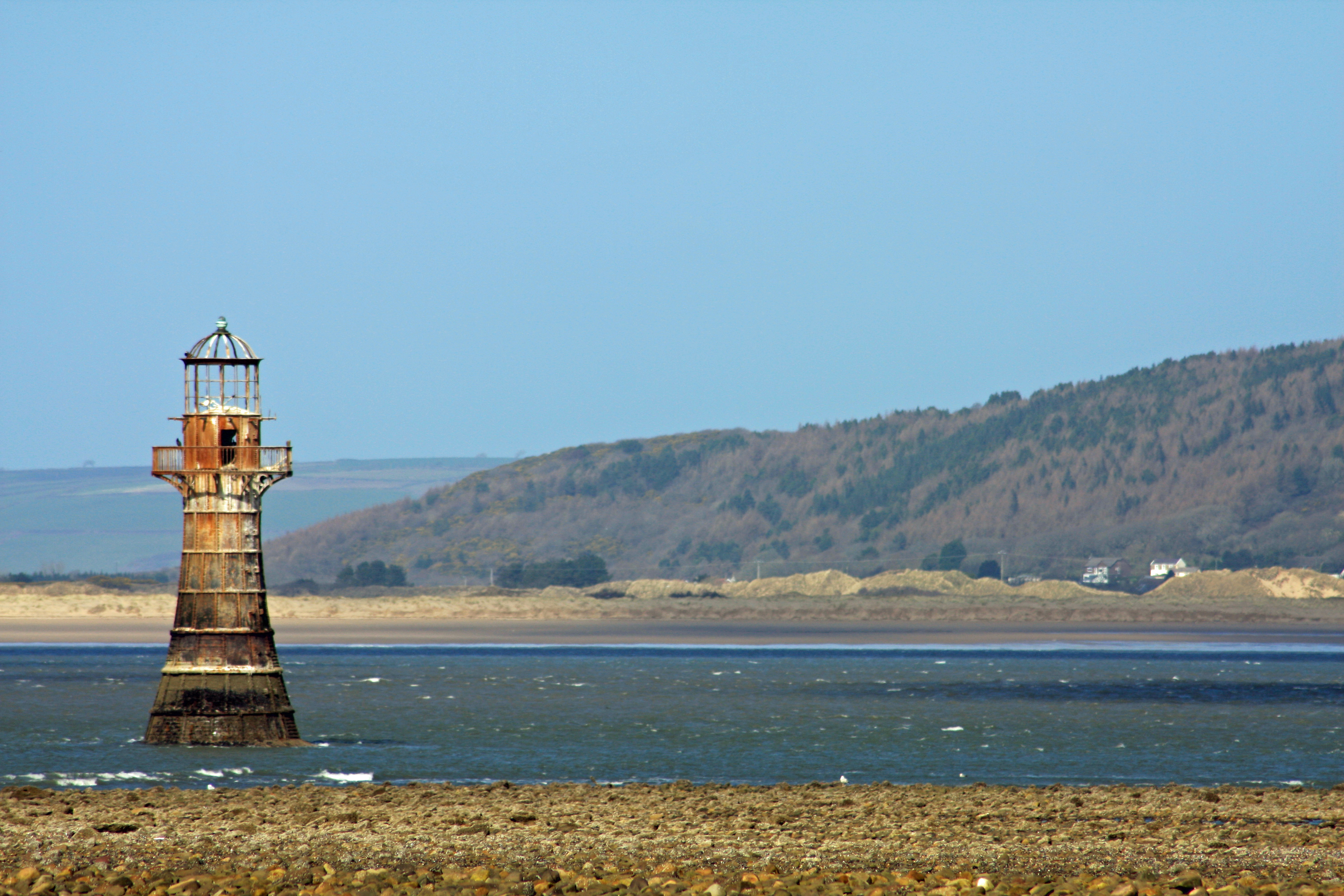
Whiteford Lighthouse, located near Whiteford Sands

The first known cast-iron British lighthouse was at Swansea Harbour and was built in 1803. The architect was William Jernegan, and the plates were cast at the Neath Abbey Ironworks.

Cast iron was also used for Maryport Lighthouse, Cumberland, in 1834. In 1836, the lighthouse at the Town Pier, Gravesend, Kent, was built from cast iron. In 1842, two cast-iron leading lights were erected at Aberdeen, with elegant tapering octagonal towers and a smooth external face. At Sunderland, another well-known example was built on the pier head in 1856.

The first 'solid' rock or wave-washed cast-iron tower was erected on the exposed Fastnet Rock in 1854, but this cracked and was replaced by a masonry tower in 1904.

In the middle of the nineteenth century, the engineer Alexander Gordon designed a number of fine cast-iron towers for colonial waters. These were cast at Pimlico and shipped out to be erected by comparatively unskilled labour. Some still survive in Jamaica and Bermuda, and a cast-iron tower at Tiri-tiri, New Zealand, built in 1920, is one of the last in this material.

Whiteford Lighthouse is the only cast-iron lighthouse in Britain which is wave-washed, although it can be reached on foot at low tide. The handful of other surviving lighthouses of this type stand well clear of the water on either harbour piers or reefs.

Whiteford Lighthouse is listed by Cadw as Grade II* as a rare survival of a wave-swept cast-iron lighthouse in British coastal waters, and an important work of cast-iron architecture and nineteenth-century lighthouse design and construction. It is also a Scheduled Ancient Monument.

== See also ==
- List of lighthouses in Wales
- Grade II* listed buildings in Swansea

== Sources ==
- The Second Whiteford Lighthouse, by J Hartley, in Gower 56 (2005)
- Whitford Lighthouse Listing Description, record number 22885, dated 03.03.2000 by Cadw
- Lighthouses of Wales, by D B Hague, Archaeological Journal (1979) pp 296–8
- Whitford Lighthouse Options Appraisal Report, by Acanthus Holden Architects for Cadw Sir Gaerfyrddin Cyf. (July 2008)
- Report for the Royal Commission on Ancient and Historical Monuments Wales, by Douglas Hague (1971)
