= Cwmrhydyceirw =

Coordinates: 51.68348°N 3.91219°W

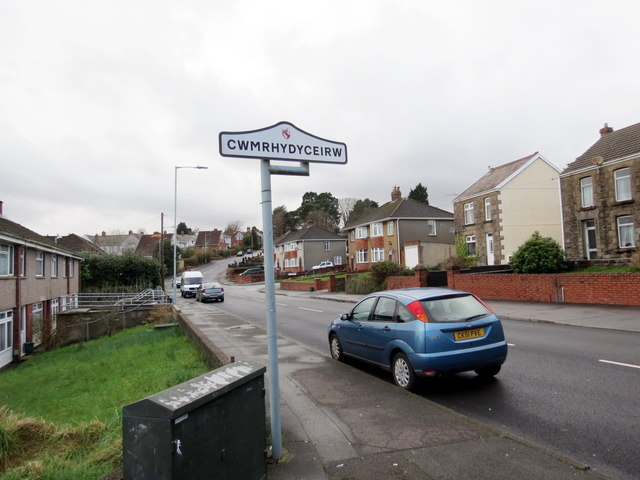
- Welcome sign on Llanllienwen Road

- Location within Swansea
- OS grid reference: SS6698
- Principal area: Swansea
- Preserved county: West Glamorgan
- Country: Wales
- Sovereign state: United Kingdom
- Post town: SWANSEA
- Postcode district: SA6
- Dialling code: 01792
- Police: South Wales
- Fire: Mid and West Wales
- Ambulance: Welsh
- UK Parliament: Swansea East
- Senedd Cymru – Welsh Parliament: Swansea East

Cwmrhydyceirw is a village in the City and County of Swansea, south Wales. The village is located about 1 mile north of Morriston town centre. It is home to the main campus of Morriston Hospital, Morriston Comprehensive School, and Cwmrhydyceirw Primary School.

== Name ==
The English translation of Cwmrhydyceirw means "the valley of the stags' ford", which gave rise to the name of local pub "The Deer's Leap". However, the name of the village may be corrupted from its original, thought to have been "Cwmrhydycwrw" – a reference to the ale-like appearance of the local stream ("cwrw" meaning ale in Welsh).

== Landscape and geography ==
Ebenezer Methodist Chapel is located near the entrance of the old Cwmrhydyceirw Quarry on Cwmrhydyceirw Road. Originally built during the late nineteenth century, the chapel was rebuilt in 1909. In the latter half of the 20th century, the chapel suffered a sharp decline in members, from 60 members in 1975 to just 10 in 2000. The chapel was eventually closed on 31 December 2000. After years of disuse, the chapel was eventually converted into flats offering domiciliary support.

== In literature ==
- Lucky Jim by Kingsley Amis makes brief reference to an academic text by the fictional Professor Haines of Swansea University on the topic of medieval Cwmrhydyceirw.
- In August 1963, the poet Vernon Watkins chose a stone from Cwmrhydyceirw's quarry to be inscribed with lines from 'Fern Hill' and placed in Cwmdonkin Park as a permanent memorial to Dylan Thomas. Watkins wrote two poems about the visit: 'At Cwmrhydyceirw Quarry' and 'Cwmrhydyceirw Elegiacs'.
