= Cwmdonkin Park =

Park in Swansea, Wales

Coordinates: 51.6217°N 3.9685°W

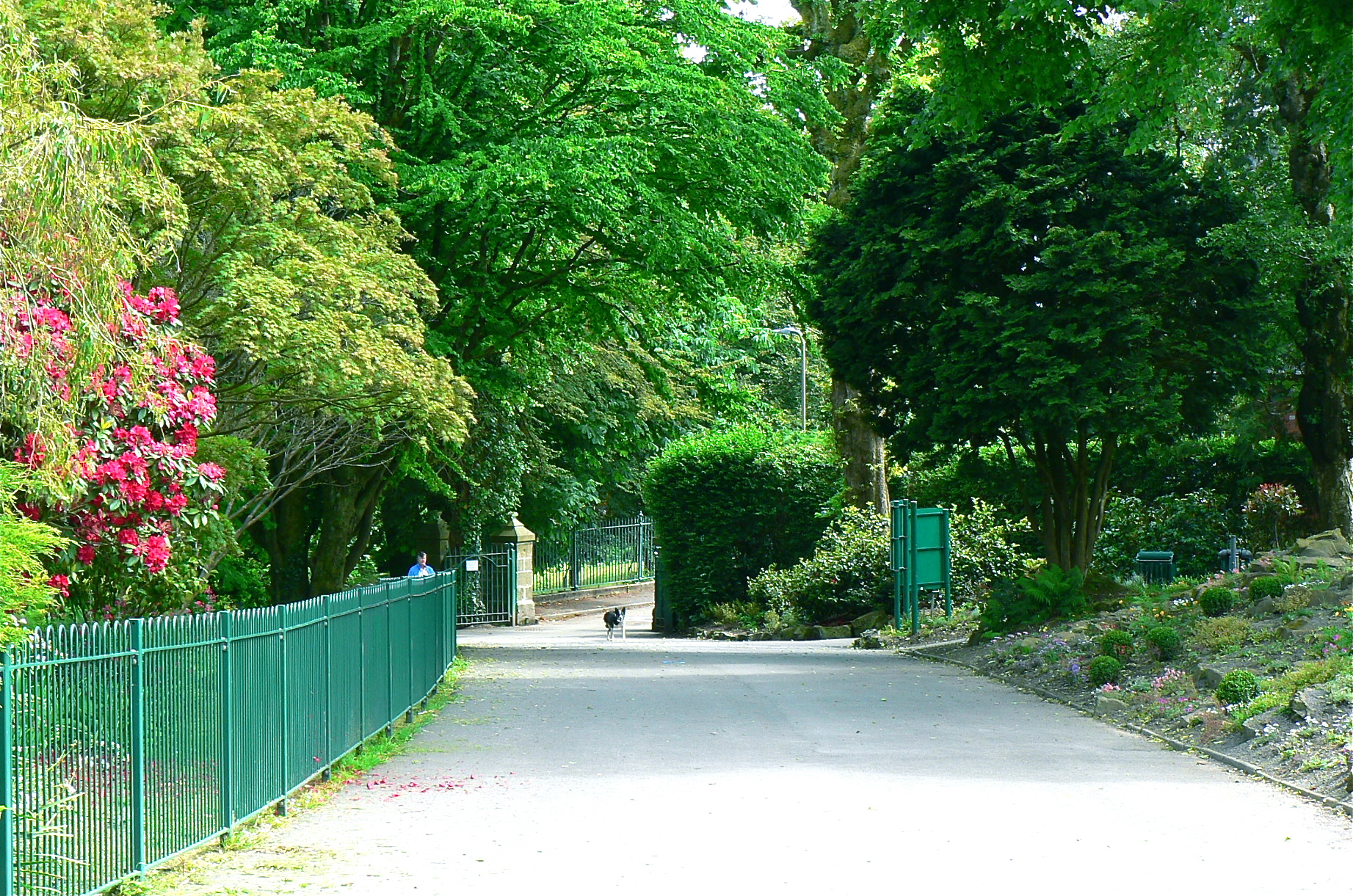
- Cwmdonkin Park
- Interactive map of Cwmdonkin Park
- Type: Public park
- Location: Uplands; Swansea, Wales
- Area: 13 acres (5.3 ha)
- Created: 1874
- Operator: City and County of Swansea
- Status: Open all year

Cwmdonkin Park is an urban park situated in the Uplands area of Swansea, Wales. It has a children's play area, water gardens, tennis courts, and a bowling green. The park is known for its associations with Dylan Thomas, and is listed on the Cadw/ICOMOS Register of Parks and Gardens of Special Historic Interest in Wales.

== History ==
Cwmdonkin Park is a well-preserved urban park from the Victorian era. It sits on 13-acres of land which, at the time of the park's opening, was on the western edge of the town of Swansea. However, the park is now situated within the residential area of Uplands to the west of the city centre.

The use of the land for public recreation originated with the creation of Cwmdonkin reservoir around 1850 by William Henry Smith and the Swansea Waterworks Company. The records of the Borough of Swansea and The Cambrian newspaper detail the somewhat controversial use of public funds to take over and run "the destructive pit at Cwmdonkin, euphemistically called a reservoir".

The first suggestion to landscape the grounds around the reservoir was raised in 1853, but it was not until 1874 that Swansea Council purchased two fields from Mr James Walters for £4,650 to create the park, which was opened on 24 July 1874. There was some criticism that the park was in an essentially wealthy, middle-class area of town: this led to the emergence of the "Open Spaces Movement" led by William Thomas of Lan, which campaigned for more parks for deprived working class areas.

Cwmdonkin's reservoir was filled in with rubble in the 1950s and landscaped to become a children's play area. The park's octagonal bandstand has also been removed. However, although their surfaces have been replaced by tarmac, the narrow winding paths at the west end of the park that were shown on an Ordnance Survey map in 1878 are largely unchanged.

== Associations with Dylan Thomas ==
Poet Dylan Thomas grew up near the park at 5 Cwmdonkin Drive. This semi-detached house, in which Thomas was born and lived until he was 23, is where he created two-thirds of his published work. The house had been bought by his parents in August 1914 when it was newly built, and Dylan was born in the front bedroom later that year on 27 October.

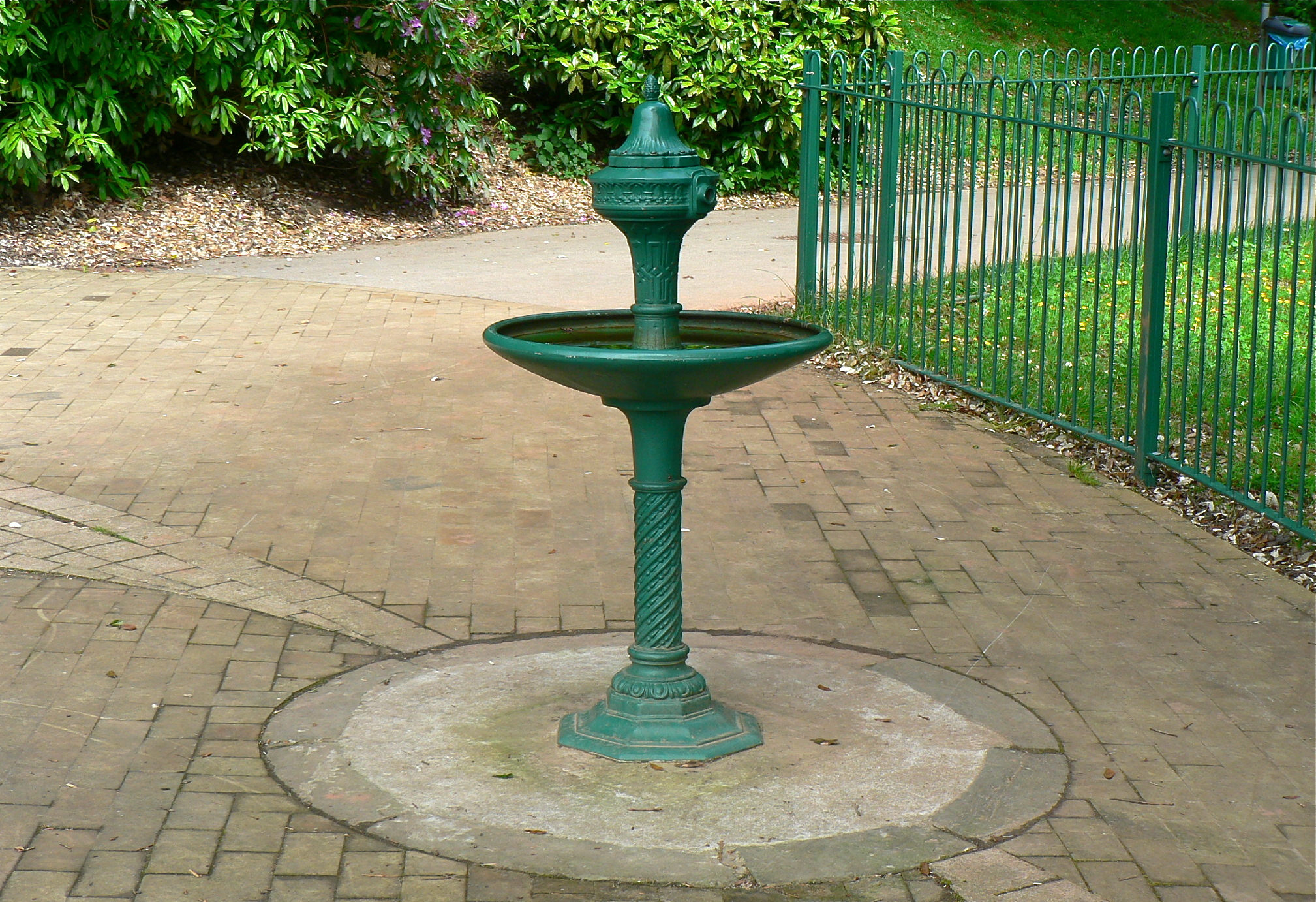
The cast-iron drinking fountain mentioned by Dylan Thomas in 'The Hunchback in the Park'.

Cwmdonkin Park features heavily in Thomas's radio broadcasts, Return Journey and Reminiscences of Childhood, and is the setting for his poem 'The Hunchback in the Park'. In the poem, Thomas mentions 'the fountain basin where I sailed my ship' – a reference to the park's cast-iron drinking fountain, which is still in place today (though the 'chained cup' has been removed).

In addition to the eponymous character of 'the hunchback', the poem also features a park keeper who is widely thought to be John Smallcoombe. Smallcoombe, or 'Old Smally', was Cwmdonkin's first park keeper, and was said to have been terrorised by the young Thomas and his friends. A portrait of a much younger Smallcoombe in high-ranking Salvation Army uniform, painted around 1900, is on display as part of the 'Love the Words' exhibition at Swansea's Dylan Thomas Centre.

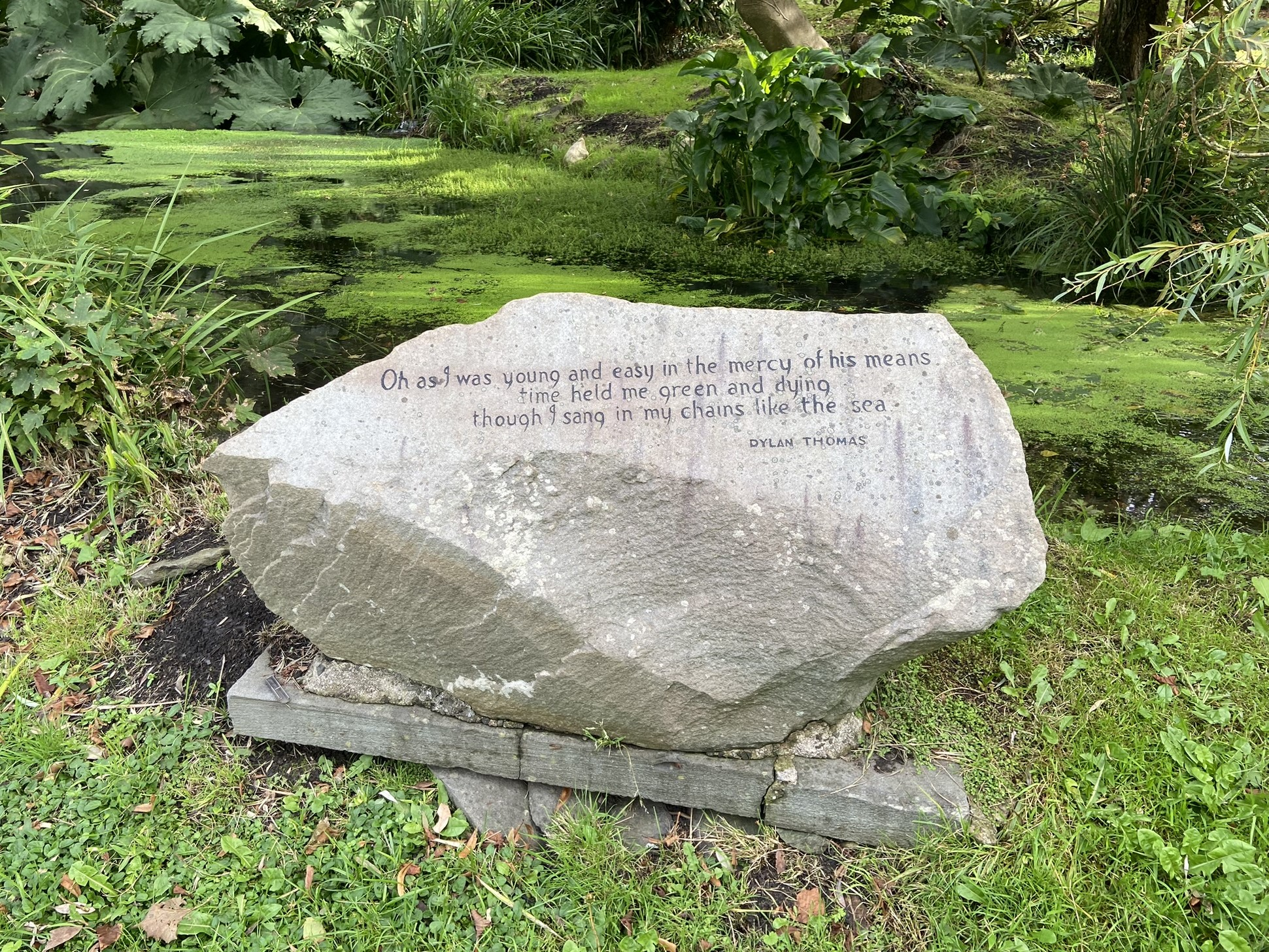
The memorial stone inscribed with lines from 'Fern Hill', photographed after the 2018 restoration.

Both Smallcoombe and Cwmdonkin Park also feature in the radio broadcast Return Journey, written by Thomas after Swansea was partially destroyed by the Three Night Blitz in February 1941. The broadcast concludes with Thomas attempting to find the younger version of himself in the park of his childhood, and asking the park keeper if he remembered the young boy who used to taunt him.

Dylan Thomas died in New York on 9 November 1953, aged 39. A memorial stone, inscribed with lines from his poem 'Fern Hill', was placed in Cwmdonkin Park to mark the ten-year anniversary of his death on 9 November 1963. The stone originally came from Cwmrhydyceirw Quarry in the north of the city, where it was picked out by Dylan's friend Vernon Watkins and the sculptor Ronald Cour. Watkins wrote two poems inspired by the choosing of his friend's memorial stone: 'At Cwmrhydyceirw Quarry' and 'Cwmrhydyceirw Elegiacs'. The inscription on the stone later became obscured by moss and erosion, before being restored in 2018.

Cwmdonkin Park also features as one of the places mentioned in Watkins' poem 'Ode to Swansea', published in The Atlantic in April 1953.

== Other notable people ==
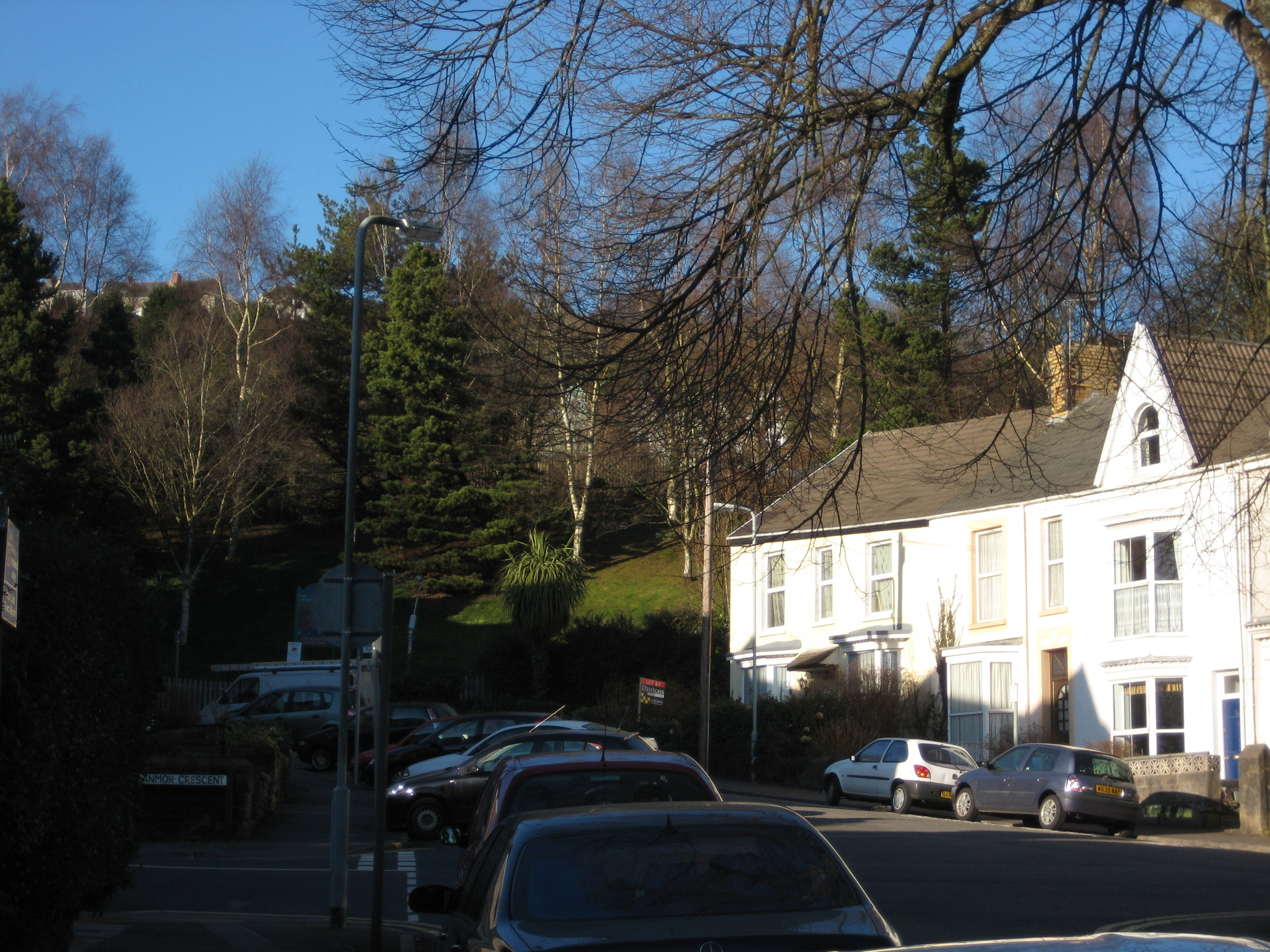
The southern entrance to Cwmdonkin Park on The Grove. The Amis family lived at number 24 (to the right of the picture).

In addition to the poets Dylan Thomas and Vernon Watkins, Cwmdonkin Park also has links with several other notable people. In the early 1950s, Kingsley Amis, Martin Amis and Sally Amis lived at 24 The Grove, close to the southern entrance to the park. In 2015, a blue plaque honouring the older Amis was unveiled on the house.

From the age of 11, the professional tennis player Mike Davies learnt to play on the park's courts. Davies enjoyed a sixty-year career in tennis, first as a player (including a period as the number one ranked player in Great Britain and a member of the British Davis Cup team), then later as an entrepreneur and one of the pioneers of the professional game.

== Refurbishment ==
On 7 September 2013, after an extensive £1.39m refurbishment, the park reopened in time to celebrate the 100th anniversary of Dylan Thomas's birth. The park is listed at Grade II on the Cadw/ICOMOS Register of Parks and Gardens of Special Historic Interest in Wales.
