= Richard Hancorne =

The Reverend Richard Hancorne
- Born: 24 December 1687; St Donats, Glamorgan, Wales
- Died: 14 January 1732 (aged 44); Sully, Glamorgan, Wales
- Education: Jesus College, Oxford
- Years active: 1708–1732
- Father: Thomas Hancorne

Richard Hancorne (24 December 1687 – 14 January 1732) was a Welsh clergyman.

== Early life ==
Hancorne was born on 24 December 1687 in St Donats, Glamorgan, the son of the Rev. Thomas Hancorne of St Donats by his wife Cecilia. He matriculated at Jesus College, Oxford on 30 October 1705, receiving his B.A. in 1709 and M.A. in 1714.

== Career ==
Hancorne began his career at the Church of Llantwit Major with Llysworney. He was appointed as a reader on 20 November 1708 and a lecturer on 30 November 1715, which he retained until 7 May 1723.

He was ordained as a deacon on 4 June 1710 and as a priest on 27 May 1711 by John Tyler, Bishop of Llandaff.

Hancorne was the rector of Barry from 29 September 1716 and Sully from 24 July 1721. He held both until his death in 1732.

Hancorne is commemorated for his restoration of the chancel of the Church of the Holy Trinity, Llandow during his incumbency in 1712. The event is recorded in Latin by a stone tablet on the exterior south wall of the chancel.

== Death ==
Hancorne died on 14 January 1732 in Sully, Glamorgan. His tombstone was placed in the Church of the Holy Trinity, Llandow. Originally in the floor of the sanctuary, it now rests against the east wall of the porch.

== Sources ==
- Hancorn, Richard (1708 - 1732) at Clergy of the Church of England Database
- Holy Trinity, Llandow at Cowbridge Parish
