= Richard Hancorn (clergyman) =

The Reverend Richard Hancorn
- Born: 1727; Whitney, Herefordshire
- Died: 1789 (aged 61–62)
- Education: Hereford Cathedral School
- Alma mater: St John's College, Cambridge
- Years active: 1752–1765

Richard Duppa (né Hancorn; 1727–1789) was an English clergyman and aristocrat.

== Early life and education ==
Hancorn was the son of Richard Hancorn of Hereford by his wife Martha. He attended Hereford Cathedral School under the tutelage of headmaster Thomas Willim and matriculated at St John's College, Cambridge on 14 May 1746, receiving his B.A. in 1750 and M.A. in 1753.

== Career ==
Hancorn was ordained as a deacon on 24 August 1752 by John Thomas, Bishop of Lincoln, and as a priest on 10 June 1753 by Joseph Wilcocks, Bishop of Rochester.

He began his clerical career as a curate at the Parish Church of Bicker, Lincolnshire from 25 September 1752 and the Parish Church of Allhallows, Kent from 12 June 1754. Hancorn was the vicar of Stoke from 11 June 1753 to 22 October 1765.

In 1765, Hancorn inherited the estates of his kinsman, Baldwin Duppa of Hollingbourne Hill, with an injunction for him to take the name and arms of Duppa, for which an act was passed by George III. Thereafter, he quit the clerical profession and took the title of esquire.

== Death ==
Hancorn died in 1789 without issue. Upon his death, his estates were bequeathed to his brother Baldwin Hancorn, who took the name of Duppa, as did his male heirs.
