= Uplands, Swansea =

Uplands
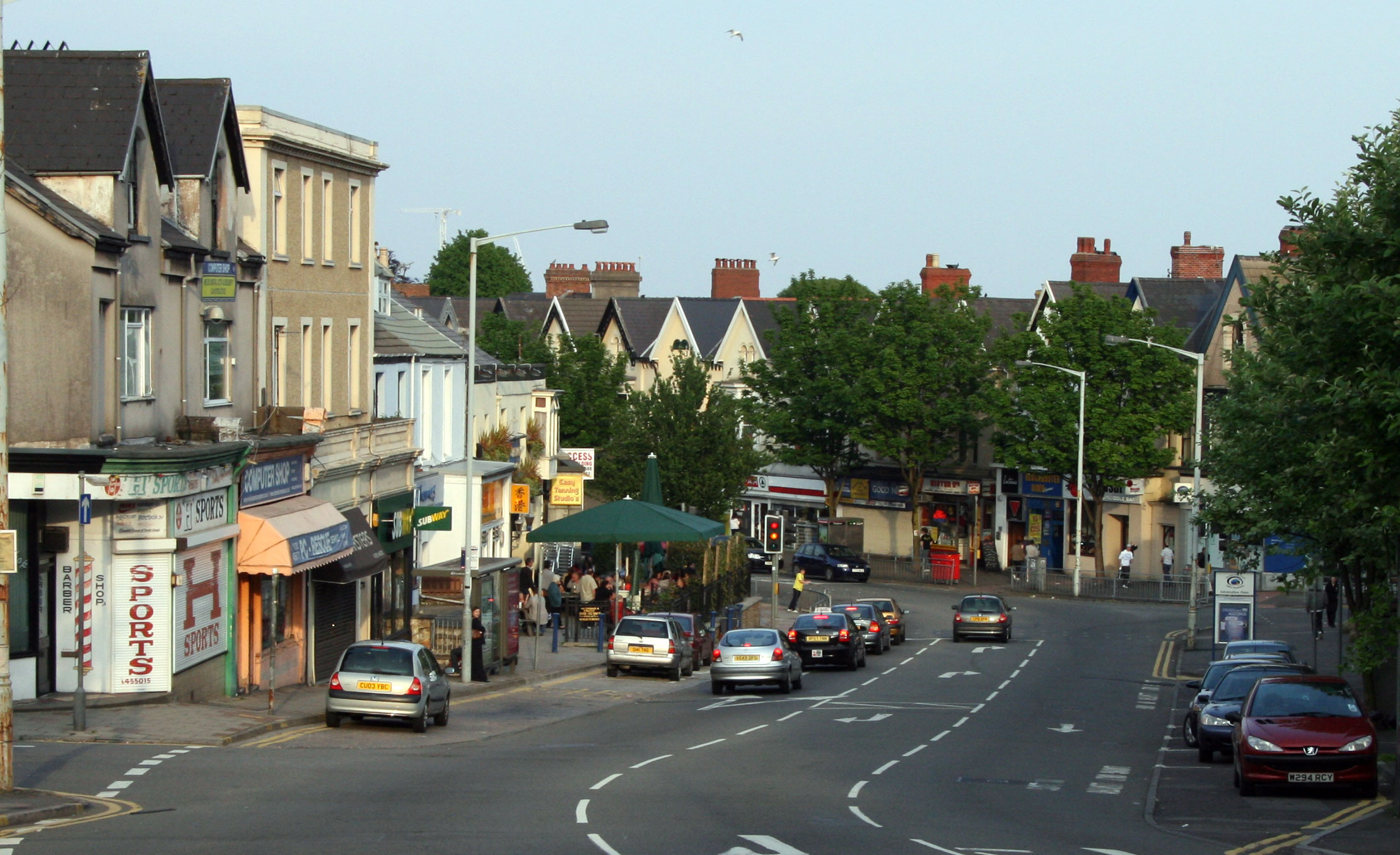
- Uplands Square

- Location within Swansea
- Population: 15,665
- OS grid reference: SS641928
- Principal area: Swansea
- Preserved county: West Glamorgan
- Country: Wales
- Sovereign state: United Kingdom
- Post town: SWANSEA
- Postcode district: SA1/SA2
- Dialling code: 01792
- Police: South Wales
- Fire: Mid and West Wales
- Ambulance: Welsh
- UK Parliament: Swansea West
- Senedd Cymru – Welsh Parliament: Swansea West
- List of places UK Wales Swansea 51.62°N 03.96°W Map of the community

Uplands is a suburb and community of Swansea, Wales. It lies about a mile (2 km) to the west of Swansea city centre, and falls within the Uplands electoral ward. It is centred on the A4118 road, which links Swansea city centre and Sketty. The main road begins as Walter Road from the east, and becomes Sketty Road towards the west. Much of the area is hilly. The population of the community and ward in 2011 was 15,665 and in terms of Welsh identity had the lowest percentage in the county.

== The area ==
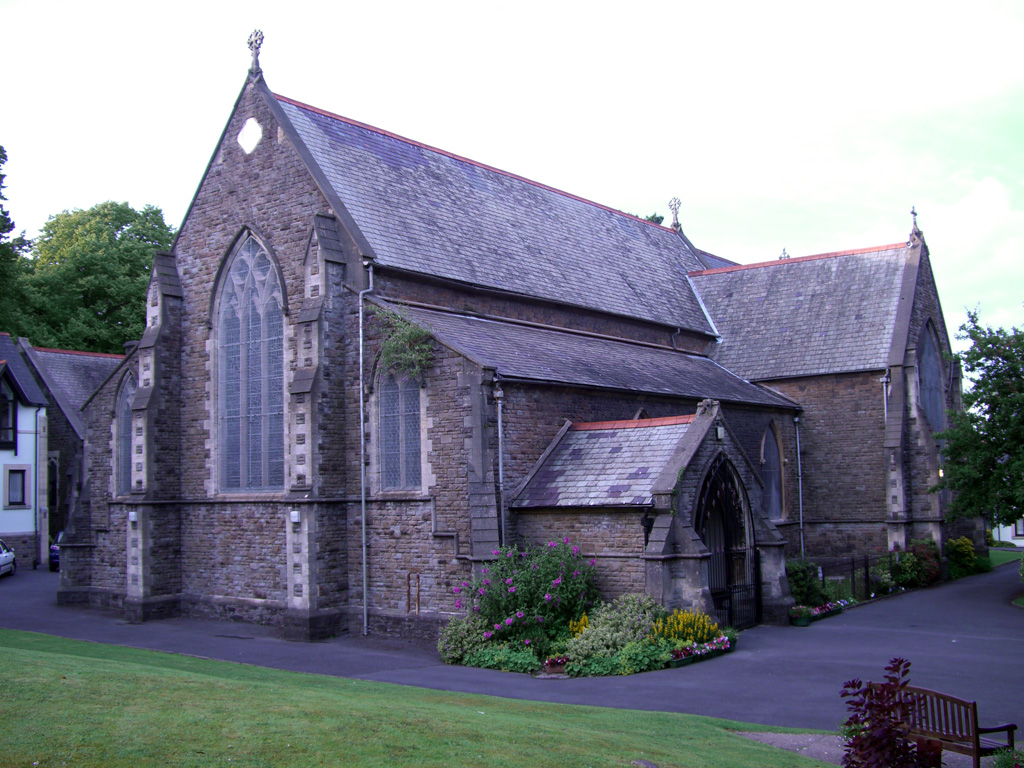
St. James Church, Uplands, Church in Wales.

Uplands' main shopping area is located on and around Uplands Crescent, where small businesses mix with fast-food outlets and high-street heavyweights like Boots, Sainsbury's and Tesco. The western side of Bryn-y-Mor Road also has a number of convenience stores, hairdressers, fashion boutiques, pubs and restaurants.

The area is becoming increasingly known amongst the people of Swansea for its night-life, with a number of late-night bars and restaurants having opened their doors during the early 2010s, which, along with a diverse range of independent shops and a monthly local produce market in Gwydr Square, put Uplands in TravelSupermarket's top 20 UK Hip Hang-outs in 2017. The Uplands Tavern pub however, has long been a popular venue, and was once frequented by Sir Kingsley Amis and Dylan Thomas, although the two writers were not residents of Uplands at the same time. The latter's childhood home on Cwmdonkin Drive has a blue plaque marking his birthplace. In 2012 the annual Do Not Go Gentle Festival was launched, hosting live music and literature across various venues, it aims to be "a festival Dylan Thomas might have liked".

Uplands is a relatively salubrious area of Swansea, with property prices above the national average. Council tax rates are quite high because of this, falling into band C and above. The housing stock consists of fairly large properties; three-storey properties and properties containing four bedrooms or more are common. Many of the larger properties have been converted into student houses, making the Uplands area popular amongst students attending the city's two universities.

== Governance ==
Though a community (civil parish) of Swansea, Uplands doesn't elect a community council.

The community is coterminous with an electoral ward to Swansea Council, also named Uplands. At the 2022 Swansea Council election all four councillor seats were won by the Uplands Party.

== Notable buildings and landmarks ==
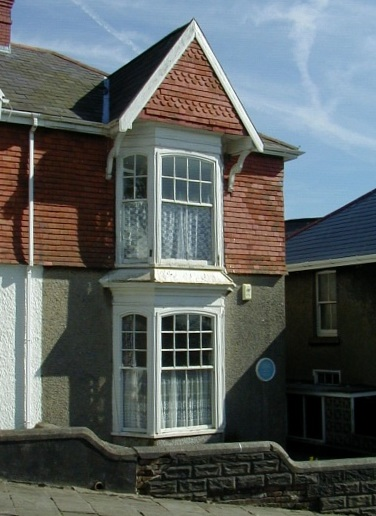
5 Cwmdonkin Drive, birthplace of Dylan Thomas

Eaton Crescent, considered to be one of the most upmarket residential areas close to Swansea's city centre, is where Conservative politician Michael Heseltine grew up. The crescent consists mainly of large three-storey semi-detached and terraced 4–6 bedroom town-houses. During the late 1980s, a large number of properties were converted for use as student houses, but since the late 1990s it has mainly returned to housing families.

Stella Maris is a convent occupied by the Sisters of Ursulines of Jesus on Eaton Crescent. The sisters once ran the Stella Maris Primary School, a former private convent school that is now closed.

St. James' Church, located on Walter Road, was opened in 1867 as a chapel of ease for the nearby St. Mary's in Swansea's town centre. It became a separate parish in 1985. Pantygwydr Baptist Church was opened in 1907 during the development of housing on the land of the demolished Pant-y-gwydir House, once the residence of industrialist J. R. Wright. There is a Jehovah's Witness Kingdom Hall on the corner of Walter Road and Mirador Crescent, and the Dharmavajra Kadampa Buddhist Centre is located in Springfield House on Ffynone Road. The Mansion House, the official residence of the Lord Mayor of Swansea, is also on Ffynone Road.

The Llwyn-Y-Bryn campus of Gower College Swansea is located just off Walter Road. There are two private schools in the area; Oakleigh House provides primary education and Ffynone House provides senior education for GCSE and A-Level pupils.

Local parks are Cwmdonkin Park, Rosehill Quarry Community Park, and Brynmill Park, with the former an important location and source of inspiration for Dylan Thomas, who lived so close to the park during his childhood that "on summer evenings I could listen, in my bed, to the voices of other children playing ball". Cwmdonkin Park features heavily in the radio broadcasts 'Return Journey' and 'Reminiscences of Childhood' and, most famously, the poem 'The hunchback in the park'. A memorial stone with lines from another of Thomas' poems, 'Fern Hill', was placed in the park in 1963.

== Notable residents ==
- Dylan Thomas was born at 5 Cwmdonkin Drive in 1914 and lived there until he was 19 years old.
- Michael Heseltine (Conservative MP) lived on Eaton Crescent during his childhood.
- Kingsley Amis, Martin Amis and Sally Amis lived at 24 The Grove in the early 1950s and later at 53 Glanmor Road in the later 1950s and early 1960s.
- Sir John Roper Wright, 1st Baronet had a residence called Pant-y-gwydir House in the area that was demolished some time before 1907 to make way for housing known as the Pantygwydr Estate.
