= GWR 4073 Class 7028 Cadbury Castle =

Great Western Railway locomotive

GWR 7028 Cadbury Castle
Type and origin
- Power type: Steam
- Designer: Charles Collett
- Builder: BR Swindon Works
- Build date: May 1950
Specifications
- Configuration
  - Whyte: 4-6-0
- Gauge: 4 ft 8 1/2 in (1,435 mm)
- Leading dia.: 3 ft 2 in (0.965 m)
- Driver dia.: 6 ft 8 1/2 in (2.045 m)
- Fuel type: Coal
- Cylinders: Four (two inside, two outside)
Career
- Operators: British Railways
- Power class: BR: 7P
- Withdrawn: 28 December, 1963
- Disposition: Scrapped

Number 7028 Cadbury Castle was a Great Western Railway 4073 Castle class 4-6-0 steam locomotive built at the former GWR Swindon Works on 19 May 1950. The Castle Class locomotives were built as express passenger locomotives on the GWR. The Castle Class locomotives were to replace the earlier 4000 Star class locomotives. They were designed by the railway's Chief Mechanical Engineer, Charles Collett. Cadbury Castle cost £10,546 and an extra £1,094 for her Hawksworth tender.

== 7028's working life ==
Cadbury Castle was based at Landore, Swansea for 11 years. She worked normal passenger express trains around GWR's network. On 31 October 1961 she was moved to Llanelli and fitted with a double chimney and a 4 row superheater. She worked at Llanelli for a further two years before being withdrawn on 28 December 1963. By this time in her 13 years of service her mileage was 624,626 miles (1,005,238 km). On 19 March 1964, she was scrapped by Balborough Metals Ltd, Briton Ferry, Swansea. It is worth noting that although Cadbury Castle was of GWR design, she only served with BR, as she was built 2 years after the railways were nationalised.

== The Western Pullman ==
Cadbury Castle formed part of a Hornby model railways train set, The Western Pullman. In this set Cadbury Castle was featured with four Pullman carriages and part of Hornby's Track Pack system. This set has ceased production now and has been replaced by Whittington Castle in the new DCC set.
