= Morgannwg (journal) =

- Discipline: History
- Language: English and Welsh
- Edited by: Lisa Tallis and Madeleine Gray

Publication details
- History: 1957–present
- Publisher: Glamorgan History Society (United Kingdom)
- Frequency: Annual

Standard abbreviations
- ISO 4: Morgannwg

Indexing
- ISSN: 0959-4655
- OCLC no.: 746297241

Links
- Journal homepage

Morgannwg: Transactions of the Glamorgan Local History Society is the annual English-language scholarly journal of the Glamorgan History Society, published since 1957, containing historical essays, archaeological reports and book reviews. It also contains society notes and meeting reports. The title comes from the Welsh word for Glamorgan (one of the thirteen historic counties of Wales).

Glamorgan Local History Society (Cymdeithas Hanes Morgannwg) was founded in 1950 to promote the study of the history of the county of Glamorgan; in 1966 it changed its name to Glamorgan History Society.

The journal has been digitized by the Welsh Journals Online project at the National Library of Wales.
