= Oxwich =

Coordinates: 51.559°N 4.171°W

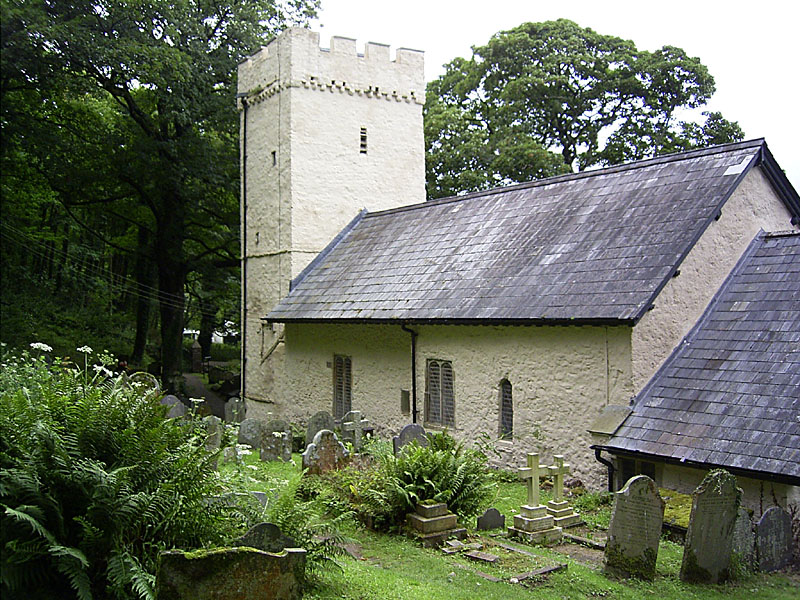
- St Illtyd's Church

- Location within Swansea
- OS grid reference: SS494868
- Principal area: Swansea
- Preserved county: West Glamorgan
- Country: Wales
- Sovereign state: United Kingdom
- Post town: SWANSEA
- Postcode district: SA3
- Dialling code: 01792
- Police: South Wales
- Fire: Mid and West Wales
- Ambulance: Welsh
- UK Parliament: Gower
- Senedd Cymru – Welsh Parliament: Gower

Oxwich is a village on the Gower Peninsula, in the city and county of Swansea in south Wales. Oxwich is part of the small community of Penrice which extends from the village of Horton to Oxwich Bay, and as of 2001 recorded a population of 454 inhabitants.

Oxwich's main site of historical interest is the castle which is thought by many academics to be the most historic castle on the Gower Peninsula. The earliest evidence of it being inhabited is in 1459, where Philip Mansel was recorded as holding it. The Mansel family were a minor gentry in South Wales, who grew in power and prestige under the Tudor monarchs. The parish church of St. Illtyd's overlooks Oxwich Bay. A place of worship has stood on this site since the 6th century, but the main tower of today was built in the 14th century. The chancel of this church is thought to be a 6th-century cell. The church bell in the tower also dates back to the 14th century, but was recast in 1892. In the churchyard there is a well, which locals believe is haunted by a ghost. Legend has it that a ghost was seen in the churchyard before vanishing into a well.

== National nature reserve ==
The series of coastal sand-dunes, lakes and woodland form a national nature reserve designated for its great variety of ecosystems, its rare and unusual plant life and for it very unusual combination of environment in such close proximity.

== Tourism ==
The Oxwich Bay Hotel is close to the church of St. Illtyd, set in eight acres of land overlooking the west end of Oxwich Bay. There is also a campsite in Oxwich. It has a heated swimming pool and accepts tents and trailers.

== Geography and wildlife ==
Short video by Natural Resources Wales of some of the animals at Oxwich

Oxwich Bay is one of the most popular beaches in Gower, which has an expanse of curving sand, with Cefn Bryn in the background. The nearby woods at Nicholston however, came under threat in the 1950s, when they were bought by a speculator who 'was more interested in reducing the woods to timber than re-planning an over-mature landscape.' An Oxwich Bay protection Fund was then launched, and a compromise was agreed to ensure limited felling.
