= Penrice, Swansea =

Village and community in Swansea, Wales

Coordinates: 51°34′N 4°11′W

Penrice: Welsh: Pen-rhys
- Village and community
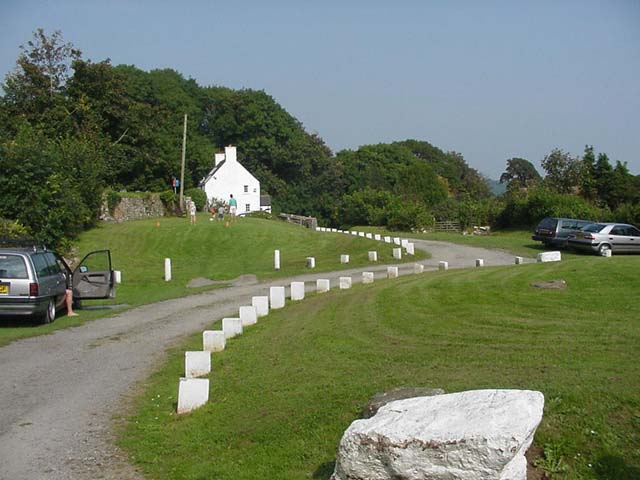
- Village green
- Principal area: Swansea
- Country: Wales
- Sovereign state: United Kingdom
- Police: South Wales
- Fire: Mid and West Wales
- Ambulance: Welsh
- List of places UK Wales Swansea Map of the community

Penrice (Welsh: Pen-rhys) is a village and community in Swansea, Wales, on the Gower peninsula. It had a population of 451 as of the 2011 UK census and the community includes the villages of Oxwich, Oxwich Green, Slade, Little Reynoldston, Horton as well as Penrice itself. Penrice has an elected community council.

Penrice Castle is nearby, as is St Andrew's Church, Penrice. A conservation area covers the village.

== See also ==
- List of villages in Gower
