= Penrice Castle =

Castle in Penrice, Swansea, Wales

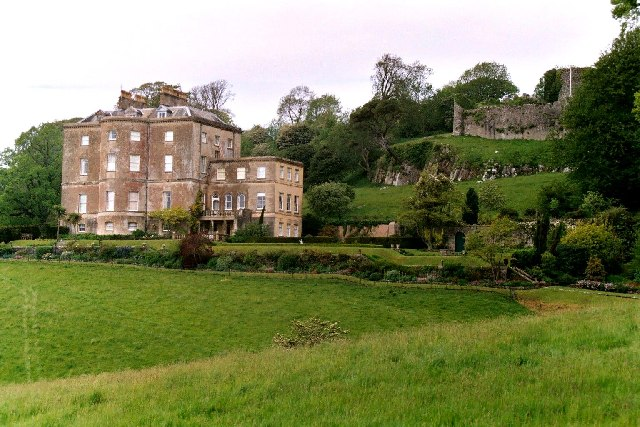
The 18th-century mansion (left) and the remains of the castle (right)

Penrice Castle (Welsh: Castell Pen-rhys) is a 13th-century castle near Penrice, Swansea on the Gower Peninsula, Wales. Nearby is a neo-classical mansion house built in the 1770s. The mansion is a Grade I listed building, and the surrounding gardens and park is also listed at Grade I on the Cadw/ICOMOS Register of Parks and Gardens of Special Historic Interest in Wales.

== History ==
Penrice Castle is the 13th-century successor to a strong ringwork to the south east, known as the Mountybank. It was built by the de Penrice family, who were given land there for their part in the Norman Conquest of Gower. The last de Penrice married a Mansel in 1410 and the castle and its lands passed to the Mansel family. The Mansels later bought Margam Abbey and made it their main seat, while retaining their Gower lands. The castle was damaged in the 17th-century English Civil War.

The stone castle is a large, irregular hexagon with a round keep on the west side, to which were attached two other towers and a partial mantlet or chemise wall. At the north-west corner is a twin square-towered gatehouse with another tower inside. The ground falls away steeply to the north, east, south and south west, where there are various other turrets, though not scientifically disposed. The whole structure is now in a dangerous condition, but the south wall can be seen from the footpath that runs past the 18th-century mansion on the estate (51.5742°N 4.1707°W), immediately to the south.

It entered into the possession of Edward Hancorne following his marriage to Elizabeth, daughter of Thomas Mansel of Penrice Castle, in 1707. His eldest son Thomas inherited the lands upon his father's death.

The mansion built in the 1770s by the neo-classical architect Anthony Keck for Thomas Mansel Talbot (1747–1813) of Margam and Penrice, is itself Grade I listed and among the finest country houses in Wales. While the mansion was being built, the surrounding park, also Grade I listed on the Cadw/ICOMOS Register of Parks and Gardens of Special Historic Interest in Wales, was laid out in about 1773–76 by William Emes, a follower of Capability Brown. The mansion was built to house Thomas Mansel Talbot's collection of antiquities and works of art. He visited Italy between 1769 and 1773 and bought antiquities from Thomas Jenkins, Gavin Hamilton and Giambattista Piranesi, including a Minerva with bronze helmet and a funerary monument (now in the Courtauld Institute, London). He also bought modern furniture by Albacini and Valadier and contemporary sculpture by Johan Tobias Sergel, and commissioned busts of himself and Pope Clement XIV from Christopher Hewetson (the latter now in the Victoria and Albert Museum, London). In addition he bought paintings by Rembrandt and Jacob Philipp Hackert, and drawings by Nicolas Poussin. His collections were shipped from Italy in 1772 and 1775 and displayed after his marriage in 1792. Much of the collection was later transferred to Margam Castle in Wales, and sold at auction in 1941.

Information on the Penrice household and family in 1799–1806 and after appears in the published diaries and correspondence of a Scottish-born governess, Agnes Porter. This was collated by Joanna Martin, after finding the source materials in the castle attic in about 1973.

The mansion is now inhabited by the Methuen-Campbell family, who are direct descendants of the de Penrices.

The name Penrice Castle was borne by Castle Class locomotive No. 5057 of the Great Western Railway. The name was transferred to locomotive No. 5081 in 1937 and further transferred to No. 7023 in 1949.
