= Cat hole =

Cat hole or Cathole may refer to:

- Cathole, a pit for human feces
- Hawsehole, a small hole in the hull of a ship through which hawsers may be passed
- Cathole Cave, or Cat Hole Cave, Gower Peninsula, Wales
- Cathole Mountain, in Meriden, Connecticut, United States
