= Cathole Cave =

Cave and archaeological site in Wales

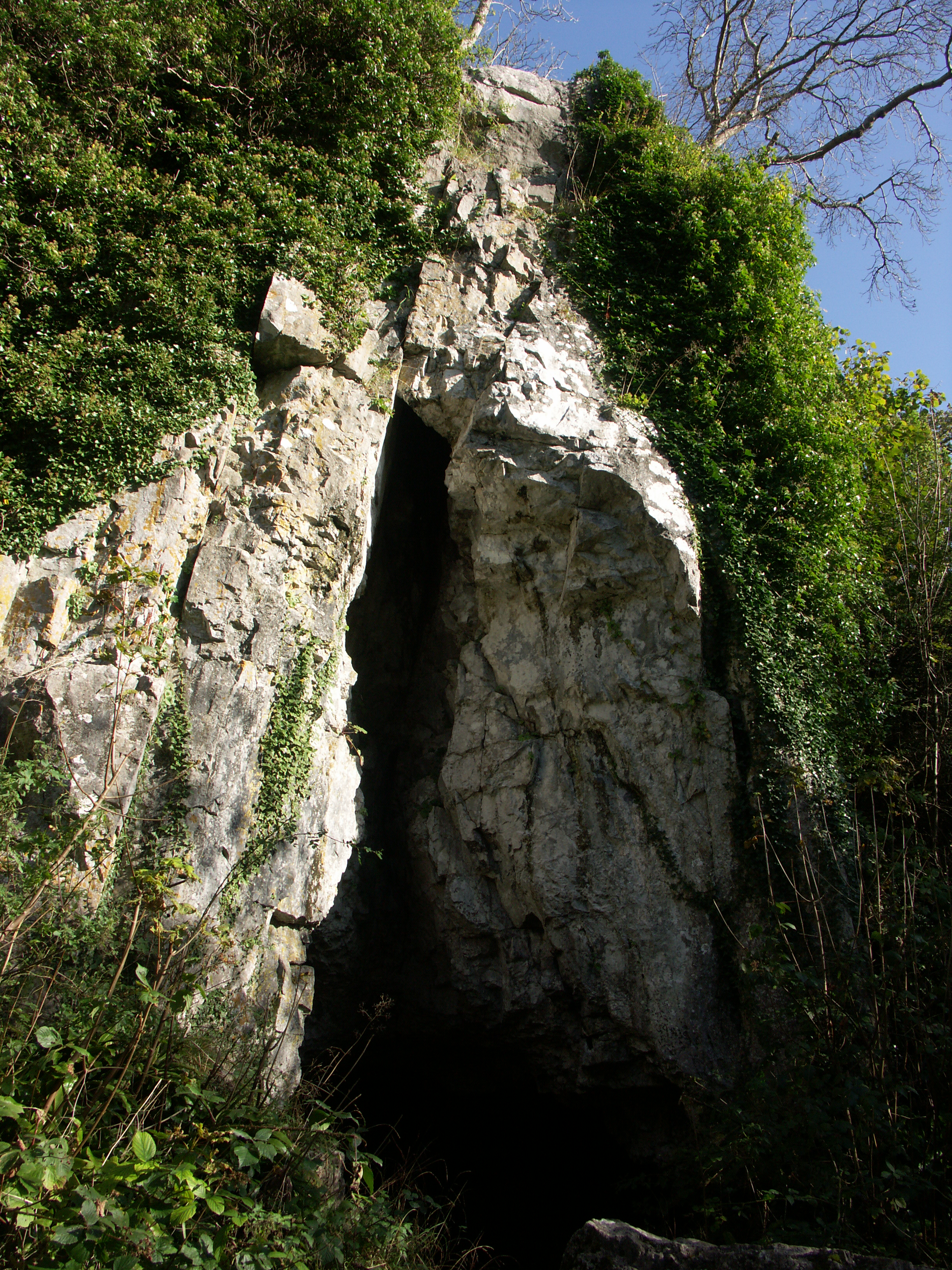
- Limestone outcrop with triangular fissure at the cave

- location in Wales Cathole Cave (the United Kingdom)
- 51°35′23.64″N 4°6′44.64″W
- Location: Parc le Breos Cwm valley, near Swansea
- Region: Wales

Site notes
- Material: Karst

Cathole Cave, Cat Hole Cave or Cathole Rock Cave, is a cave near Parc Cwm long cairn at Parc le Breos, on the Gower Peninsula, Wales. It is a steep limestone outcrop, about 200 yards (180 m) north of the cromlech along the Parc le Breos Cwm valley and near the top of the gorge, about 50 feet (15 m) from the valley floor. The cave is a deep triangular fissure penetrating the hillside and narrowing towards the top. It has two entrances, with a natural platform outside the larger of the two. It is about seven 1/2 miles (12 km) west south–west of Swansea, Wales, in what is now known as Coed y Parc Cwm at Parc le Breos, on the Gower Peninsula.

The cave was used as a shelter by bands of Mesolithic hunters and as a Neolithic ossuary. During the first excavation of the cave in 1864, finds were made only from the Mesolithic to medieval periods. In his "The Proceedings of the Prehistoric Society vol.25 (1959), pp. 260–69", archaeologist Charles McBurney notes that "In the Post Glacial period the cave was much used by Mesolithic hunters"; a conclusion confirmed by John Campbell's excavation of 1977.

A 1984 excavation by Aldhouse-Green revealed the earliest finds from the cave, two tanged points that may date to c. 28,000 BP, an interglacial period during the Late Pleistocene roughly contemporaneous with the Red Lady of Paviland. The "lady" was discovered in a cave between Port Eynon and Rhossili, about eight miles (13 km) west of Cathole Cave, and has been radiocarbon dated to c. 29,000 BP, the oldest known human burial in Great Britain.

Rock art from the Upper Paleolithic, thought to represent a reindeer, was discovered on the back wall of Cathole Cave in September 2010. The engraving, measuring approximately 15 x 11 cm, has been radiocarbon dated to 14,505 ± 560 BP. According to George Nash, the archeologist who made the discovery, it is "the oldest rock art in the British Isles, if not north-western Europe". Following the discovery, the cave was laser-scanned (using point-cloud technology). Following this project and systematic vandalism, the entrance of the cave was gated with a metal grille. Despite this set-back Nash has made further discoveries. Other marks/motifs of a possible similar date have been found elsewhere within the rear section of the cave.

Late glacial tool finds from the Upper Palaeolithic date to c. 12,000 BP: flint blades known as Cheddar points; smaller bladelets known as Cresswell points; scrapers; burins or lithic flakes; flint and bone awls; and a bone needle. Flint rarely occurs in Wales other than in drifts, or as small pebbles on beaches. Flint tools would therefore have to have been brought to Gower from other areas, such as those now known as southern or eastern England, or County Antrim, either as finished tools or as incomplete, or unworked, nodules. Remains of red fox, Arctic fox, brown bear, tundra vole, and possibly reindeer, were found at the same level as the Upper Palaeolithic tools, providing evidence of the climate c. 12,000 BP. Other animal remains excavated during the 19th century, which may predate the Late glacial finds, include mammoth, woolly rhinoceros, red deer and giant deer.

Several finds date to the Bronze Age, including a bronze socketed axe, two human skeletons, and sherds of pottery from burial urns and other vessels.
