= Parkmill =

Coordinates: 51.58274°N 4.10132°W

Parkmill: Welsh: Melin y Parc
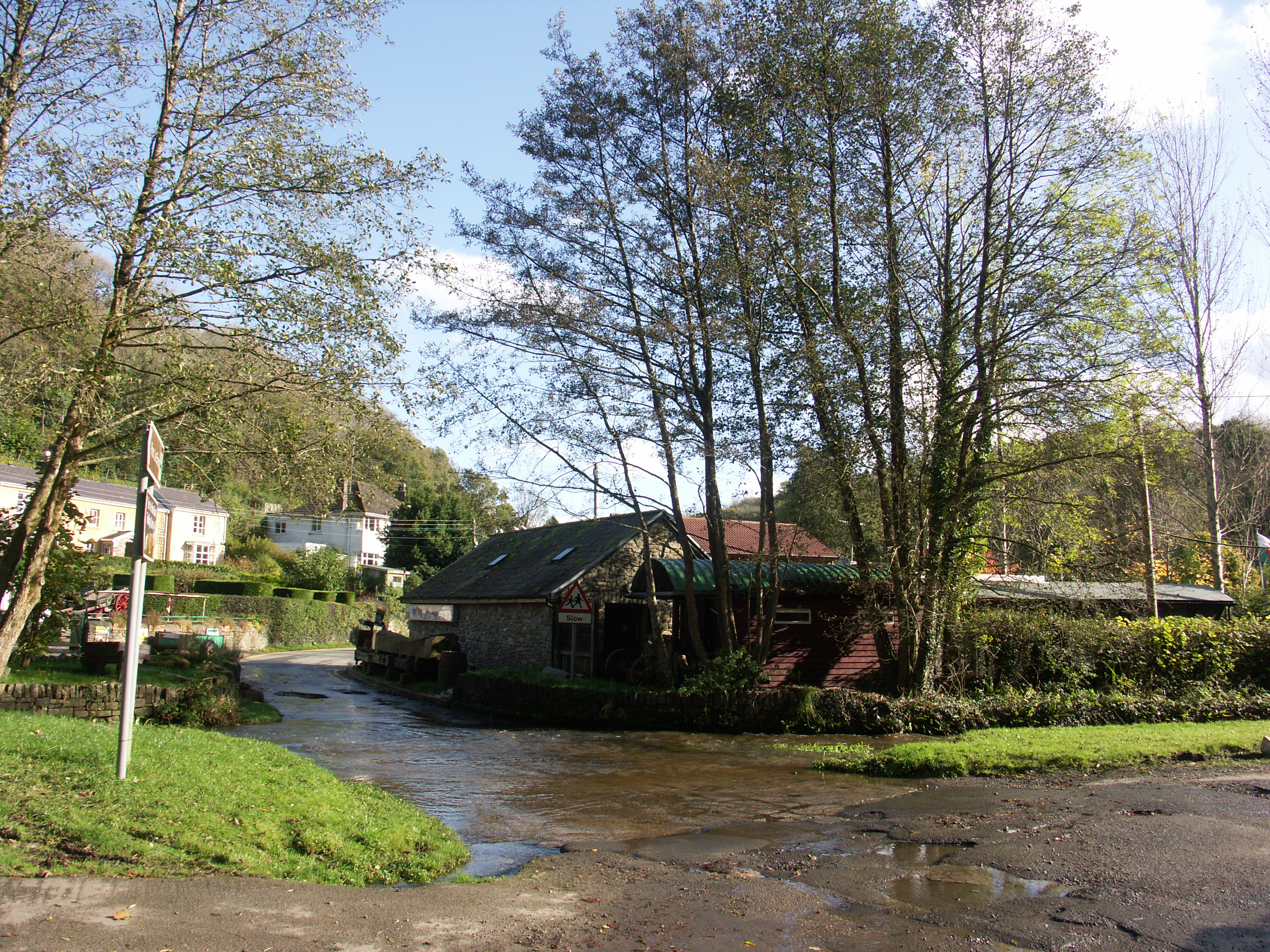
- The ford, at Parkmill, Gower

- Location within Swansea
- OS grid reference: SS545891
- Principal area: Swansea
- Preserved county: West Glamorgan
- Country: Wales
- Sovereign state: United Kingdom
- Post town: SWANSEA (Welsh: Abertawe)
- Postcode district: SA3
- Dialling code: 01792
- Police: South Wales
- Fire: Mid and West Wales
- Ambulance: Welsh
- UK Parliament: Gower
- Senedd Cymru – Welsh Parliament: Gŵyr Abertawe

Parkmill (Welsh: Melin y Parc) is a village in the Gower Peninsula, South Wales, midway between the villages of Penmaen and Ilston, about eight miles (13 km) west of Swansea, and about one mile (1.6 km) from the north coast of the Bristol Channel. The village lies to the north of the A4118, the main South Gower road between Swansea and Port Eynon, in a wooded area, at the bottom of a valley.

The building at the centre of the village is a former school that is now home to the West Glamorgan Girl Guides Activity Centre. Pennard golf course lies immediately to the south of the village. Parkmill is in the Gower ward of the City and County of Swansea.

Parkmill's only religious building is the Mount Pisgah United Reformed Church, a Congregational chapel, erected in 1822 and rebuilt in 1890.

The area is little changed from the mid 19th century, when Samuel Lewis said in his 'A Topographical Dictionary of Wales' (1849):

The hamlet of Park-Mill, forming the most populous part of the parish, [Ilston] is yet extremely rural; and the surrounding scenery, which is characterized by features of tranquillity and seclusion, is enlivened by the small rivulet called Pennarth Pill, winding along a beautiful dell, in which are the ruins of an ancient chapel. On this stream a cloth manufactory was established early in the present century, but it has been discontinued.

The 'cloth manufactory', a 12th-century water-powered corn and saw mill, at Parkmill has since been renovated and a rural crafts centre sited in it, called the Gower Heritage Centre.

== Parc le Breos ==
Parkmill once lay within a Medieval deer park, Parc le Breos, which was established in the 1221–32 CE by John de Braose, Marcher Lord of Gower as an enclosed area of about 2,000 acres (810 hectares). As well as the deer, during the 14th century the park received an income from agistment, pannage, sales of wild honey, ferns and dead wood and from rabbits, though whether these were domestic warrens or free warrens is not known.

The park is now mainly farmland and has a 19th-century Hunting Lodge, which is now an hotel and pony trekking (horse riding) centre called Parc le Breos, built about one mile (1.6 km) east north east of Parkmill

== Parc Cwm long cairn ==
The Parc Cwm long cairn, or Parc le Breos burial chamber, is a partly restored, prehistoric, megalithic chambered long barrow, built between 5,800 BP and 6,000 BP (before present), during the early Neolithic period, about three quarters of a mile (1.1 km) north west of Parkmill.

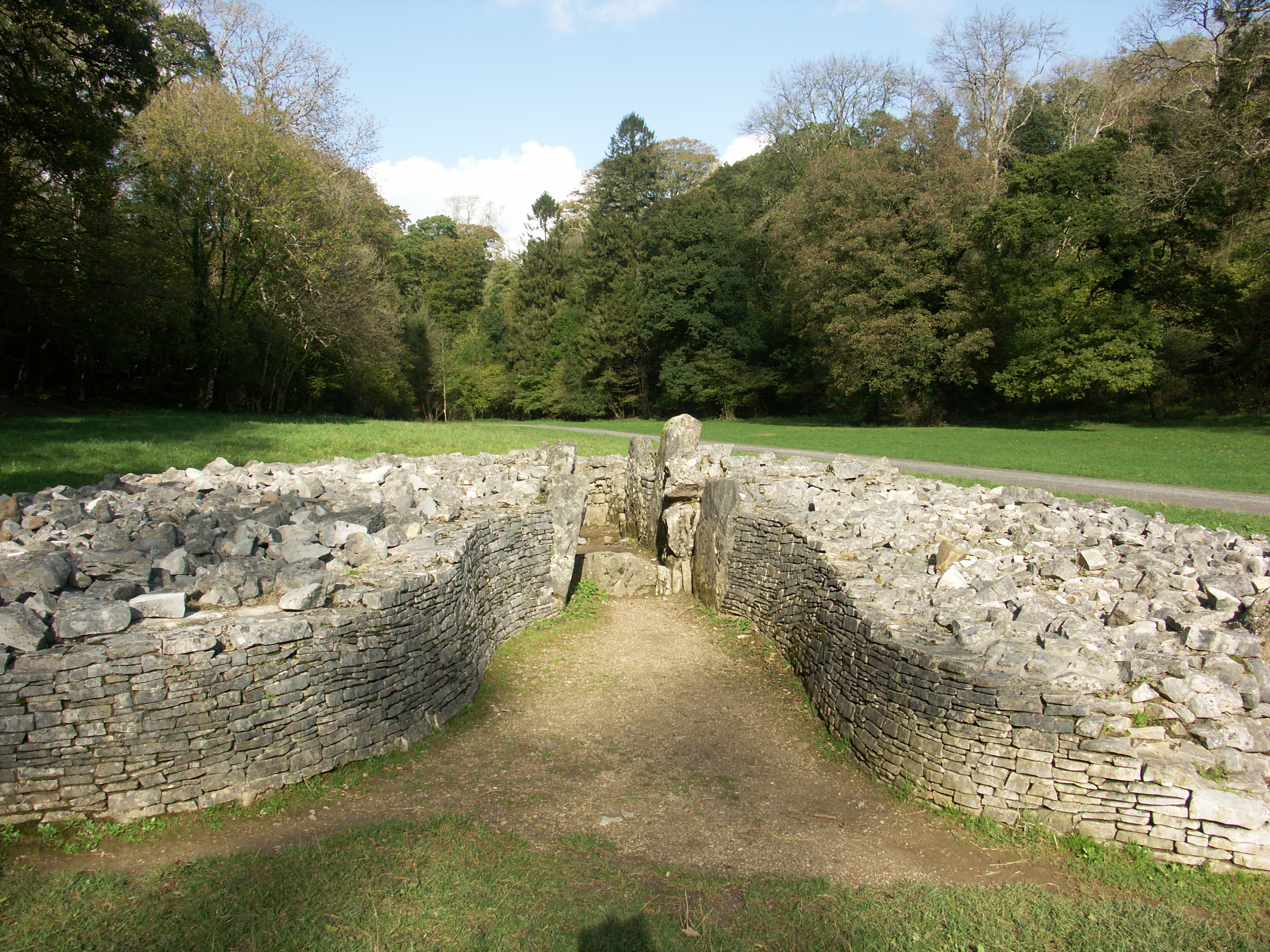
Parc Cwm long cairn, about 0.7 miles (1.1 km) from Parkmill

The cromlech is located in Coed-y-Parc, on the floor of a dry narrow valley in about 500 acres (2.0 km^{2}) of woodland, owned and managed by Forest Enterprise (Wales), in a limestone gorge, at an elevation of about 50 feet (15 m) above sea level. Pedestrian access is allowed and is free, with free parking available for 12–15 cars about 650 feet (200 m) from the site. On the opposite side of the lane to the car park a kissing gate, wide enough for a wheelchair to pass through, leads to an asphalt track that runs past the cromlech and the length of the gorge, allowing flat, disabled access to within about ten feet (3.0 m) of the site. Parc le Breos burial chamber is maintained by Cadw (English: to keep), the Welsh Historic Environment Agency.

There are caves further along Parc Cwm valley, Cathole Cave and Llethryd tooth cave, which have been used from Mesolithic to Medieval times. In the Neolithic period, corpses may have been placed in the caves until they had decomposed, before the bones were moved to the cromlech.

== La Charrette ==
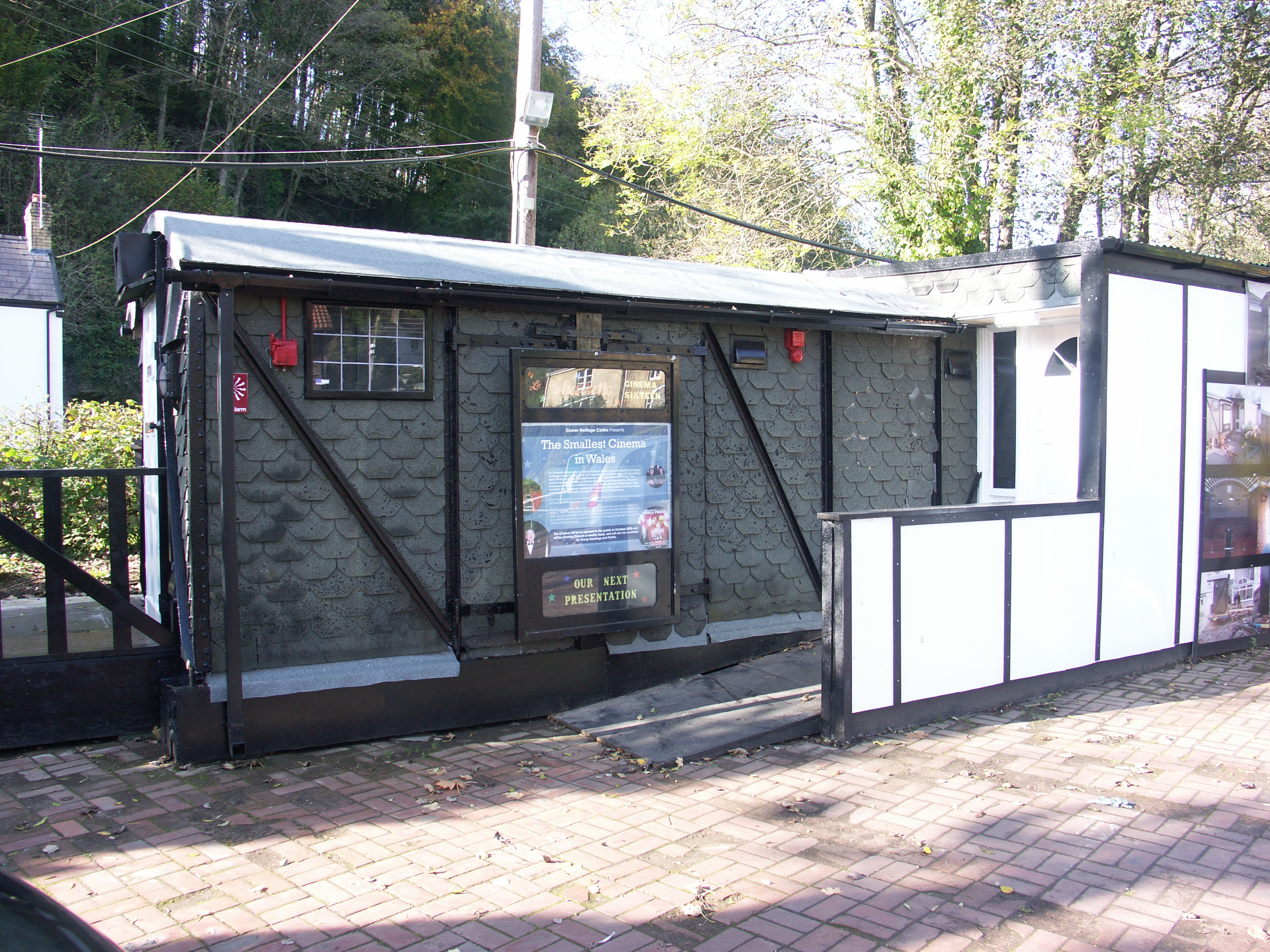
La Charrette, at Parkmill, Gower

La Charrette is recognised by the British Film Institute as the smallest cinema in Wales. The 23-seat venue, built from a disused railway carriage, was sited in a back garden in Gorseinon, near Swansea, and began showing films in 1953.

The cinema was originally constructed and run by the late Gwyn Phillips (who died in 1996), who fell in love with the movies while working as a projectionist as a teenager. Safety concerns, following wear and tear to its wood-and-steel structure, caused La Charrette to close. A visit by film critic Mark Kermode for BBC2's The Culture Show, in October 2007, resulted in the tiny venue being given a special send-off in February 2008. The black tie event consisted of the world premiere of the Danny Boyle film Alien Love Triangle (2002), starring Kenneth Branagh, Alice Connor, Courteney Cox and Heather Graham. Branagh made a personal appearance at the screening, walking up the red carpet laid between two end of terrace houses in Gorseinon, before watching the film—and special messages recorded by Cox and Graham—with Kermode and Rita Phillips, Gwyn Phillips' widow.

After the screening, the cinema was dismantled. It was rebuilt at the Gower Heritage Centre, Parkmill, where it has reopened.
