= Shallow Grave (1994 film) =

Film by Danny Boyle

- Original British poster
- Directed by: Danny Boyle
- Written by: John Hodge
- Produced by: Andrew Macdonald
- Starring: Kerry Fox; Christopher Eccleston; Ewan McGregor
- Cinematography: Brian Tufano
- Edited by: Masahiro Hirakubo
- Music by: Simon Boswell
- Production companies: PolyGram Filmed Entertainment; Channel Four Films; Glasgow Film Fund; Figment Films
- Distributed by: Rank Film Distributors
- Release dates: 16 May 1994 (Cannes); 6 January 1995 (United Kingdom)
- Running time: 92 minutes
- Country: United Kingdom
- Language: English
- Budget: £1,888,000
- Box office: £14.9 million

Shallow Grave is a 1994 British black comedy crime film directed by Danny Boyle, in his feature directorial debut, and starring Ewan McGregor, Christopher Eccleston, and Kerry Fox. Its plot follows a group of flatmates in Edinburgh who set off a chain of events after dismembering and burying a mysterious new tenant who died and left behind a large sum of money. The film was written by John Hodge, marking his first screenplay.

The production was funded by Channel Four Films and PolyGram Filmed Entertainment, and the film was distributed by Rank Film Distributors in the UK, while Columbia TriStar Film Distributors International distributed the film in other countries. Shallow Grave received generally favourable reviews from critics and was a commercial success, grossing $19.8 million worldwide.

== Plot ==
Chartered accountant David Stevens shares a flat in Edinburgh with physician Juliet Miller and journalist Alex Law. Needing a new flatmate, the trio interview several applicants in a calculatedly cruel manner, amusing themselves at the applicants' expense before finally offering the room to a mysterious man named Hugo. Shortly after he moves in, the trio finds Hugo dead from an apparent drug overdose in his room, as well as a large suitcase full of money. The friends agree to conceal the death and keep the money for themselves. They decide to remove the identifying features—hands, feet and teeth—from Hugo's body and bury the remains in the woods. David is given the gruesome task of dismembering the corpse after they draw lots, while Juliet disposes of the leftovers in her hospital's incinerator.

Unbeknown to them, Hugo is being sought by a pair of violent criminals who are torturing and murdering informants as they follow his trail. The flat below theirs is broken into, making them anxious. While Juliet and Alex go on a shopping spree with the money to "feel better," David's fears turn into full-blown paranoia. He hides the suitcase of money in the attic and begins living there, drilling holes in the attic floor to watch the living space below. The relationship between the three begins to deteriorate.

The criminals break into the flat, beating Alex and Juliet until Alex reveals where the money is. As the men enter the dark attic, David kills both of them with a hammer and returns to the woods to dispose of the bodies. Alex and Juliet become worried about David's mental state, and David becomes worried that the two are conspiring against him. The police, investigating the prior intrusion, are surprised when the three friends deny that they ever had a fourth flatmate.

The bodies are discovered in the woods, and Alex is sent by his editor to cover the story. With the police now closing in, Juliet seduces David into giving her the money so she can buy plane tickets to Rio de Janeiro and they can run away together, but secretly she plans to go alone. Alex returns from work and—realising that Juliet and David are working together and that his life is in danger—tries to phone the police. Their confrontation escalates to violence. David reveals that he knew about Juliet's secret plan to betray both him and Alex, and punches her, prompting Alex to attack him too. Alex is stabbed in the shoulder by David, but Juliet kills David before he can kill Alex.

With David dead, Juliet decides to force the knife deeper into Alex's shoulder, pinning him to the floor, so that the police will find him with David's body and blame him for all four of the deaths. She flees with the suitcase to the airport, but in the car park she discovers that it is actually filled with hundreds of newspaper clippings about the triple shallow grave, taken from Alex's newspaper. She breaks down hysterically, and with no possessions other than the plane ticket, she boards the plane to Rio.

The police arrive at the flat to find Alex pinned to the floor in a large pool of blood; it is revealed that the cash is hidden under the floorboards. David finishes the monologue that began the film. A sheet is drawn over his face and his body is slid into a drawer in the morgue.

== Cast ==
- Kerry Fox as Juliet Miller
- Christopher Eccleston as David Stevens
- Ewan McGregor as Alex Law
- Ken Stott as Detective Inspector McCall
- Keith Allen as Hugo
- Colin McCredie as Cameron
- Victoria Nairn as Woman Visitor
- Gary Lewis as Male Visitor
- Jean Marie Coffey as Goth
- Peter Mullan as Andy
- Leonard O'Malley as Tim
- John Hodge as Detective Constable Mitchell

== Production ==
=== Shooting ===
Shooting for Shallow Grave lasted for thirty days. The tight budgetary restraints during filming meant many of the props had to be auctioned off for them to afford sufficient film stock.

Boyle claimed that Christopher Eccleston was so afraid of getting locked in a real-life mortuary for a scene, he had to ask a crew member to stand in the shadows and comfort the nervous actor.

Danny Boyle said in his commentary on the 2009 Special Edition DVD and 2012 Blu-ray that Alex is not meant to be dead, so the line of Alex saying hello to the detective was added in post-production to clarify this.

=== Filming locations ===
The crew shot predominantly in Glasgow rather than Edinburgh, which is where the story is set, since the Glasgow Film Fund gave them a £150,000 (£308,400 today) grant. Locations in the film include Flat 6 North East Circus Place in New Town, Edinburgh. Hospital scenes were filmed at Royal Alexandra Hospital in Paisley, Renfrewshire. The dance scene was filmed at the Townhouse Hotel, 54 West George Street, near George Square in Glasgow.

== Reception ==
Shallow Grave earned Boyle the Best Newcomer Award from the 1996 London Film Critics Circle and, together with Trainspotting, led to critical commentary that Boyle had revitalised British cinema in the early 1990s.

=== Box office ===
The film was the most commercially successful British film of 1995 with a gross of £5.2 million. It opened on 23 screens in the United Kingdom and grossed £152,131 in its opening weekend, finishing ninth at the box office. £100,512 of the gross came from 8 screens in London where it finished second in the capital and set four house records. In its fourth week of release, it expanded to 136 screens and moved up to third in the chart. The film was a success in Europe but grossed a total of just $2,834,250 in the United States. It led to Boyle's internationally successful production, Trainspotting, two years later.

=== Critical response ===
On the review aggregator website Rotten Tomatoes, 72% of 54 critics' reviews are positive, with an average rating of 6.6/10. The website's consensus reads: "This black-humored thriller features characters who are more obnoxious than clever. During the second half, the movie descends into gratuitous violence." On Metacritic, the film has a weighted average score of 69 out of 100 based on 21 critic reviews, indicating "generally favorable reviews".

Caroline Westbrook of Empire magazine gave it 5 out of 5 and wrote: "This, the debut feature from acclaimed TV director Danny Boyle, is the best British thriller for years, a chilling and claustrophobic heart-stopper centring on a moral dilemma destined to fuel many a dinner party conversation." Quentin Curtis of The Independent wrote: "What makes the film fascinating, and exciting, is its marriage of British setting and American, B-movie format." Derek Elley of Variety magazine called it "a tar-black comedy that zings along on a wave of visual and scripting inventiveness."

Roger Ebert of the Chicago Sun-Times gave it 2 out of 4, and wrote "All of the materials are in place [...] But somehow they never come together." Hal Hinson of The Washington Post remarked that "Boyle, who has an impressive reputation for his work on British television, has a lithe, energetic style, and he keeps the picture moving at a brisk clip. His characters, too, are young and fresh and promisingly rude—especially McGregor's Alex—but they become less and less interesting as the movie progresses. By its conclusion, just about everything intriguing in the film has evaporated." Desson Howe, writing in the same newspaper, said that "what counts most in this grisly thriller-cum-black-comedy is jolting audiences out of their cynical complacency", but stated that while "there are moments when Shallow Grave achieves a harmonic convergence of horror and macabre humor [...] Fox, McGregor and Eccleston merely mill around the screen like the kind of living-dead folks we usually see rising from the grave." Janet Maslin of The New York Times was critical of the film and said "misanthropy overwhelms his film in ways that prove more sour than droll, despite the presence of skillful actors and a bizarrely enveloping plot."

=== Awards ===
- 1995 Angers European First Film Festival
  - Audience Award – Feature Film
  - Best Screenplay – Feature Film
  - Liberation Advertisement Award
- 1995 BAFTA – Alexander Korda Award for Best British film (shared with Andrew Macdonald)
- 1995 Cognac Festival du Film Policier
  - Audience Award
  - Grand Prix
- 1994 Dinard British Film Festival
  - Golden Hitchcock
- 1st Empire Awards (1996)
  - Empire Award for Best British Film
  - Empire Award for Best Director
  - Empire Award for Best British Actor
- 1995 Evening Standard British Film Award
  - Most Promising Newcomer for Danny Boyle
- 1995 Fantasporto (Portugal)
  - International Fantasy Film Award – Best Film
- 1994 San Sebastian International Film Festival
  - Silver Seashell – Best Director

== Music ==
Shallow Grave

Soundtrack album by Simon Boswell
- Released: 1995
- Genres: Electronic, jazz, rock
- Label: EMI
- Producer: Simon Boswell

Professional ratings
Review scores
| Source | Rating |
|---|---|
| AllMusic | 2.5/5 stars |
| Select | 3/5 medals |

Track listing

1. Leftfield – "Shallow Grave" – 4:38
2. Simon Boswell – "Shallow Grave Theme" – 3:30
3. Nina Simone – "My Baby Just Cares for Me" – 3:38
4. Simon Boswell – "Laugh Riot" – 3:02
5. Leftfield – "Release the Dubs" – 5:45
6. John Carmichael Band – "Strip the Willow" – 3:12
7. Simon Boswell – "Loft Conversion" – 5:45
8. Simon Boswell – "A Spade, We Need a Spade" – 2:41
9. Simon Boswell – "Shallow Grave, Deep Depression" – 4:49
10. Simon Boswell – "Hugo's Last Trip" – 5:39
11. Andy Williams – "Happy Heart" – 3:11

== Bibliography ==
- Mayer, Geoff; McDonnell, Brian (2007). Encyclopedia of Film Noir. Westport, CT: Greenwood Press. pp. 377–380. ISBN 978-0313038662.
