= La Charrette =

Former cinema in the UK

Coordinates: 51.583°N 4.102°W

La Charrette was for several decades the smallest cinema in the UK. It closed in February 2008.

A tiny, 23-seat venue, sited in a back garden in the town of Parkmill, near Swansea, 'La Charrette' (French for 'the carriage') was built from a disused railway carriage. With flock wallpaper and hand-operated curtains, 'La Charrette' began showing films in 1953.

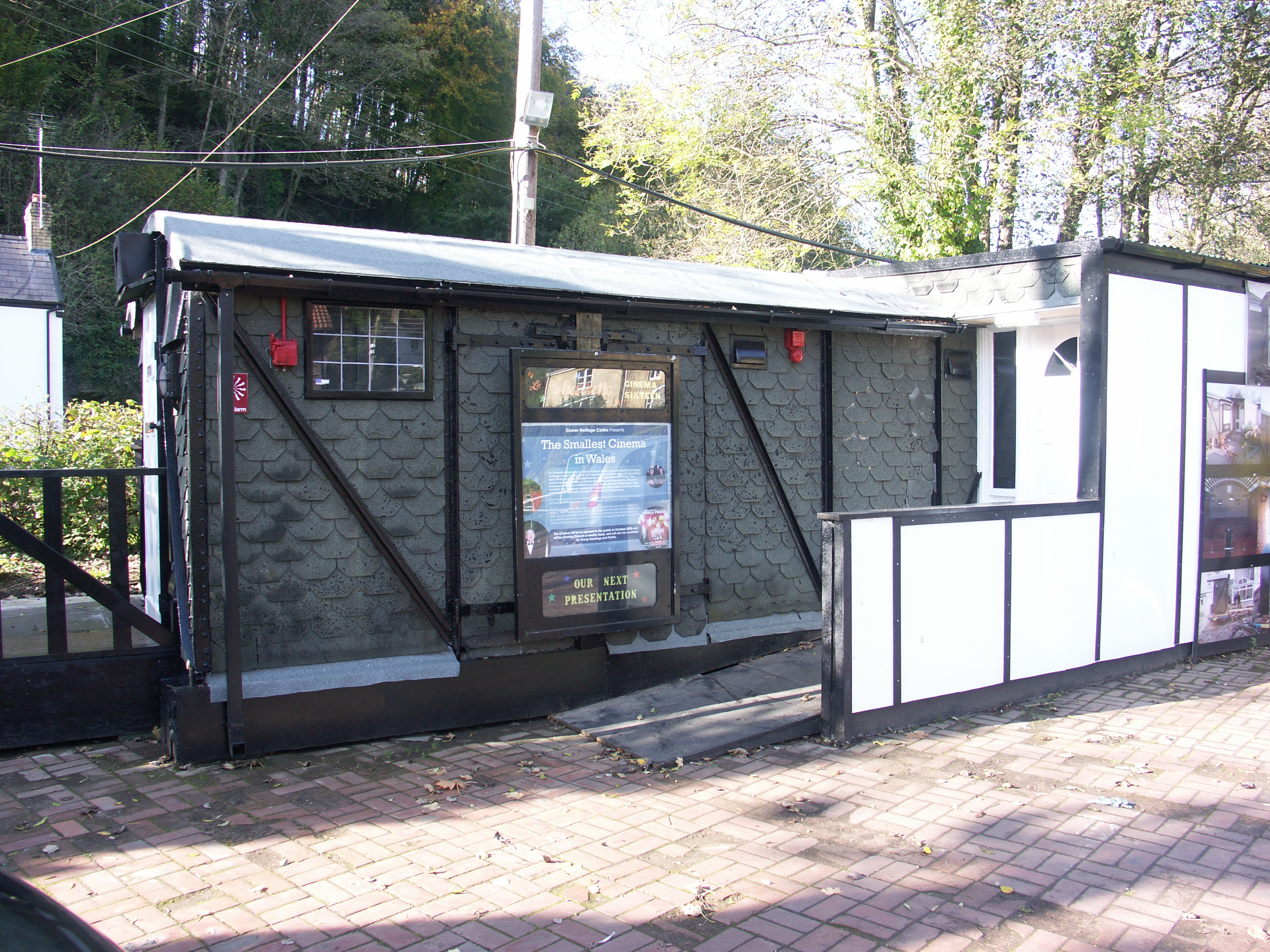
La Charrette, at Parkmill, Gower

== History ==
The cinema was originally constructed and run by Gwyn Phillips, an electrician who fell in love with the movies in his youth while working as a projectionist. After Mr Phillips died in 1996, 'La Charrette' was kept open by his widow, Rita.

A meticulously kept, hand-written record of every film shown at the cinema reveals that the first movie to be screened there in 1953 was Reluctant Heroes. That same year, locals were able to see Oliver Twist, King Kong and Winchester ‘73. Later decades saw the screening of The French Connection and even the controversial Straw Dogs. More recently, Saving Private Ryan, Elizabeth and The Queen were shown.

== Closure ==
Made unsafe by the irreparable decay of its wood-and-steel structure, 'La Charrette' was originally expected to close in October 2007 after a screening of Ocean's 13. However, a visit by film critic Mark Kermode for BBC2's The Culture Show resulted in the tiny venue being given a special send-off in February 2008.

The event consisted of a special premiere screening of the previously unseen Danny Boyle film Alien Love Triangle (2002), starring Kenneth Branagh, Courteney Cox and Heather Graham. For the screening, Branagh made a personal appearance, while Cox and Graham recorded special messages.

== Re-opening at the Gower Heritage Centre ==
Following the screening the carriage was sliced into six pieces and removed from the back garden of the house in Gorseinon, near Swansea. The pieces were transported to the Gower peninsula and welded together and La Charrette was fully restored to its former glory as part of a restoration project funded by the Gower Heritage Centre in Gower.
