= The Illustrated Mum =

1999 novel by Jacqueline Wilson

- First edition
- Author: Jacqueline Wilson
- Illustrator: Nick Sharratt
- Cover artist: Nick Sharratt
- Language: English
- Genre: Children's novel
- Publisher: Doubleday
- Publication date: 1999
- Publication place: United Kingdom
- Media type: Print
- Pages: 222 pp (first edition)
- ISBN: 0385408889
- OCLC: 59399913
- LC Class: PZ7.W6957 Il 2005
- Followed by: Picture Imperfect

The Illustrated Mum is a children's novel by English author Jacqueline Wilson, first published by Transworld in 1999 with drawings by Nick Sharratt. Set in London, the first person narrative by a young girl, Dolphin, features her bipolar mother Marigold, nicknamed "the illustrated mum" because of her many tattoos. The title is a reference to The Illustrated Man, a 1951 book of short stories by Ray Bradbury, also named for tattoos.

Wilson and The Illustrated Mum won the annual Guardian Children's Fiction Prize, judged by a panel of British children's writers. By 2001, translations had been published in Finnish, Hungarian, Italian, Spanish, and Catalan. Delacorte Press published the first American edition only in 2005. In 2025, a sequel to the book was published, Picture Imperfect.

== Plot ==
10-year-old Dolphin and her older half-sister, 13-year-old Star, live with their mother, Marigold, in a small council flat in London. Marigold, an avid lover of tattoos and part-time tattoo artist, has bipolar disorder and also has a drinking problem. Dolphin loves Marigold and thinks she is wonderful and unique, while Star is embarrassed by Marigold's tattoos and erratic behaviour. Dolphin feels like an outsider at school; she is bullied by some classmates and feels her teacher is unkind to her. She also struggles with her dyslexia. Star appears to be more popular, and Dolphin dislikes the fact that Star has an older boyfriend. Dolphin later befriends Oliver, a shy and studious boy who spends the lunch period in the library to avoid being teased.

Marigold buys tickets to see her favourite band Emerald City, with the intention of finding Micky, Star's father, who Marigold is still in love with. Both girls are surprised when she returns that night with Micky. He was unaware he had a daughter and is thrilled to meet Star, and she adores him in turn. Dolphin however dislikes him because she feels that he abandoned Marigold and neglected Star. Micky takes them all to London for the day and they do a number of fun activities and shopping. Despite it all, Dolphin feels ignored the entire day by all of them. Marigold is completely convinced they will all live together now as a family, but Micky drops them all home and returns to his place in Brighton.

In the days which follow Micky sends them presents, and Star goes to spend a weekend with him. Marigold had hoped to reconcile romantically with Micky and is upset to hear that he has a girlfriend living with him. Micky, who has no feelings for Marigold due to her mental illness, invites both Star and Dolphin to come and live with him. Dolphin, who still hates Micky, stays loyal to Marigold and refuses to abandon her but Star leaves to be with Micky. After Star leaves, Marigold has a mental breakdown and paints herself white all over using toxic paint to hide her tattoos. Dolphin phones for an ambulance despite knowing Marigold's fear of hospitals. Later Dolphin finds out that due to her mental illness Marigold may be in hospital for some time.

With her mum ill in hospital and with nowhere else to go, Oliver encourages Dolphin to contact her father, who she knows nothing about, except that his name is also Micky and he works as a swimming instructor. Together they manage to track him down and he's pleased to meet her. Dolphin hopes he will look after her, but learns he has a wife and daughters already and decides to do things properly, getting in touch with child services so Dolphin can be in foster care for a while. Dolphin is initially terrified of going into a foster home having heard Marigold's horror stories from her own childhood in foster homes, but she stays with a kind older woman and three babies. Her father takes her to visit Marigold, who is on medication for her bipolar disorder. The two slowly begin to develop a father-daughter relationship.

Star appears at the foster home after returning to the flat to find both Marigold and Dolphin gone. Star stays in foster care with Dolphin and they argue at first, Star blaming everything on Dolphin for ruining her time with Micky and refuses to believe what Dolphin tells her. But then they reconcile and go to visit Marigold together. The story ends with Dolphin deciding that even though Marigold is in hospital and she and Star are in foster care, they are still a family.

== Adaptation ==
A television adaptation starring Michelle Collins as Marigold Westward and Alice Connor and Holly Grainger as her daughters Dolphin and Star, respectively, aired in 2003. The script was by Debbie Isitt, and it was directed by Cilla Ware. Ware had previously directed the television adaptation of another of Wilson's books, Double Act, and went on to adapt a third, Best Friends. The drama won the Children's BAFTA award in 2005 for best schools drama, and Debbie Isitt won the award for best adapted writer.

=== Cast ===
- Dolphin Westward - Alice Connor
- Marigold Westward - Michelle Collins
- Star Westward - Holly Grainger
- Micky - Con O'Neill
- Oliver Morris - Henry Cox
- Ronnie Churley - Ryan Bruce
- Kayleigh - Charlotte Graham
- Yvonne - Chelsea Corrigan
- Miss Hill - Lisa George
- Mr Harrison - John Elkington
- Mrs Luft - Pauline Jefferson
- Tasha - Sacha Parkinson
- Mark - Luke Bailey
- Michael - Bruce McGregor
- Lizzie - Alison Burrows

== Reception ==
Jill Murphy from The Bookbag revealed that she became a fan of Wilson after reading The Illustrated Mum, opining that the novel "made me laugh. It made me cry. And, more than anything else, it felt truthful."

== Sequel ==
On World Book Day in 2025, Wilson announced that a sequel to The Illustrated Mum would be released later that year. Titled Picture Imperfect, it will explore Dolphin, 33, who is unlucky in love, working at a tattoo parlour and is often collecting her mother from the police station, while Star works as a doctor in Scotland with her own family. In 2024, a year prior, Wilson had revisited her Girls book series. She was excited to do the same with The Illustrated Mum and explained: "I discovered what fun it is... it's like a party game - thinking about your childhood favourites that you wrote about. And one of the books that people have mentioned over the years is The Illustrated Mum". Picture Imperfect follows Dolphin in adulthood, during a rapidly changing period of her life, as she confronts the consequences of her childhood and develops her unique talents and resilience, ultimately defying the odds to recognize her own needs.
