= John Hodge (screenwriter) =

Scottish screenwriter and dramatist

- Born: 1964 (age 61–62); Glasgow, Scotland, United Kingdom
- Occupations: Physician, screenwriter
- Years active: 1994–present

John Hodge (born 1964) is a Scottish screenwriter and dramatist from Glasgow, who adapted Irvine Welsh's novel Trainspotting into the script for the film of the same title. His first play Collaborators won the 2012 Olivier Award for Best New Play. His films include Shallow Grave (1994), Trainspotting (1996) A Life Less Ordinary (1997), The Beach (2000), The Final Curtain (2002), and the short film Alien Love Triangle (2002).

== Life and career ==
Born and raised in Glasgow, Hodge comes from a family of doctors and carried on the tradition by studying medicine at the University of Edinburgh. He was the writer of the annual Medics' Musical in 1988. Hodge started writing screenplays after meeting producer Andrew Macdonald at the Edinburgh Film Festival in 1991. He moved to London after writing Shallow Grave and gave up medicine to concentrate on writing. He now lives in Bath.

His films include Shallow Grave (1994), Trainspotting (1996), A Life Less Ordinary (1997), The Beach (2000), The Final Curtain (2002), and the short film Alien Love Triangle (2002). Most of his films are directed by Danny Boyle; Shallow Grave, Trainspotting, and A Life Less Ordinary all starred Ewan McGregor. In 2022, Hodge made his first foray into television with the spy thriller television series The Ipcress File for ITV.

Hodge's second play 'flatpack' debuted at the Rondo Theatre, Bath in March 2025. It was performed by the Rondo Theatre Company and directed by Matt Matron.

== Filmography ==
- Shallow Grave (1994, writer)
- Trainspotting (1996, screenplay)
- A Life Less Ordinary (1997, writer)
- The Beach (2000, screenplay)
- The Final Curtain (2002, writer)
- The Seeker: The Dark Is Rising (2007, screenplay)
- Alien Love Triangle (2008, short, writer)
- The Sweeney (2012, story)
- Trance (2013, screenplay)
- The Program (2015)
- T2 Trainspotting (2017)
- The Ipcress File (2022)

== Awards ==
- 1995: BAFTA Award for Best Adapted Screenplay: Trainspotting: Won
- 1996: Academy Award for Writing Adapted Screenplay: Trainspotting: Nominated.
- 2012 Olivier Award for Best New Play: Collaborators: Won
