= Parc le Breos =

Medieval deer park in Wales

Coordinates: 51°35′18″N 4°6′45″W

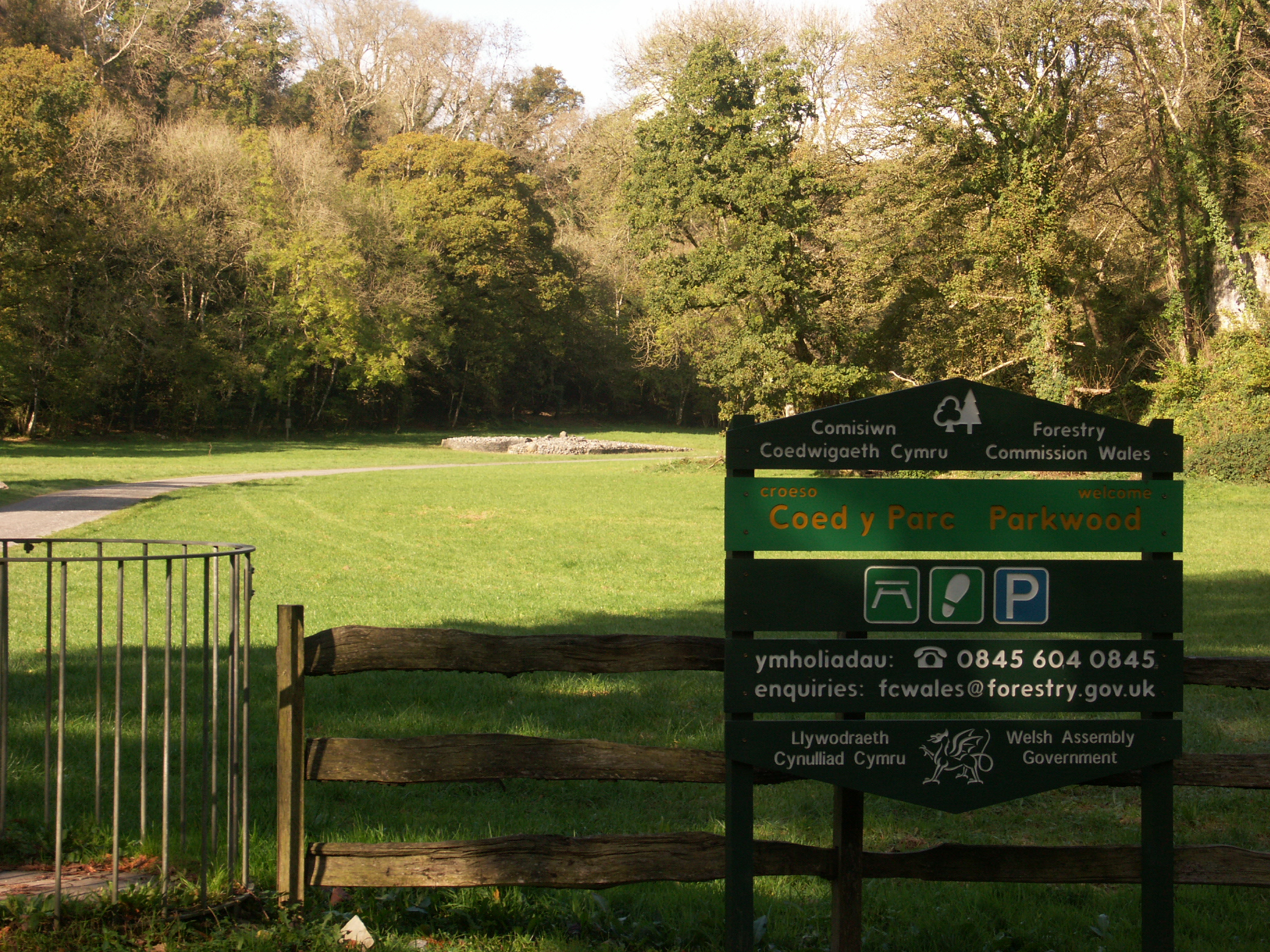
Parc le Breos Cwm from the entrance of Coed y Parc

Parc le Breos was a great medieval deer park in the south of the Gower Peninsula, about eight miles (13 km) west of Swansea, Wales, and about 1 1/4 miles (2.0 km) north of the Bristol Channel. The park was an enclosed, oval area of 6.7 miles (10.8 km) in circumference, covering about 2,000 acres (810 ha) and measuring 2 1/2 miles (east–west) by just over 1 3/4 miles (4.1 km by 2.9 km). Parc le Breos was established in the 1220s CE by John de Braose (of the powerful Cambro-Norman de Braose dynasty), Marcher Lord of Gower and husband to Margaret Ferch Llywelyn, Llywelyn Fawr's daughter. Other than for deer husbandry, the park received an income from agistment, pannage, and from sales of wild honey, ferns and dead wood. There is evidence of rabbit warrens in the park. Whether the warrens were free or domestic is unknown.

The park's boundary was originally marked by a wooden fence, or pale, on the top of an earth bank inside a ditch. Some parts of the pale survive.

Prehistoric finds and an Iron Age enclosure (above Parkmill) show the area of Parc le Breos to have been settled by modern humans since the earliest times.

== History ==
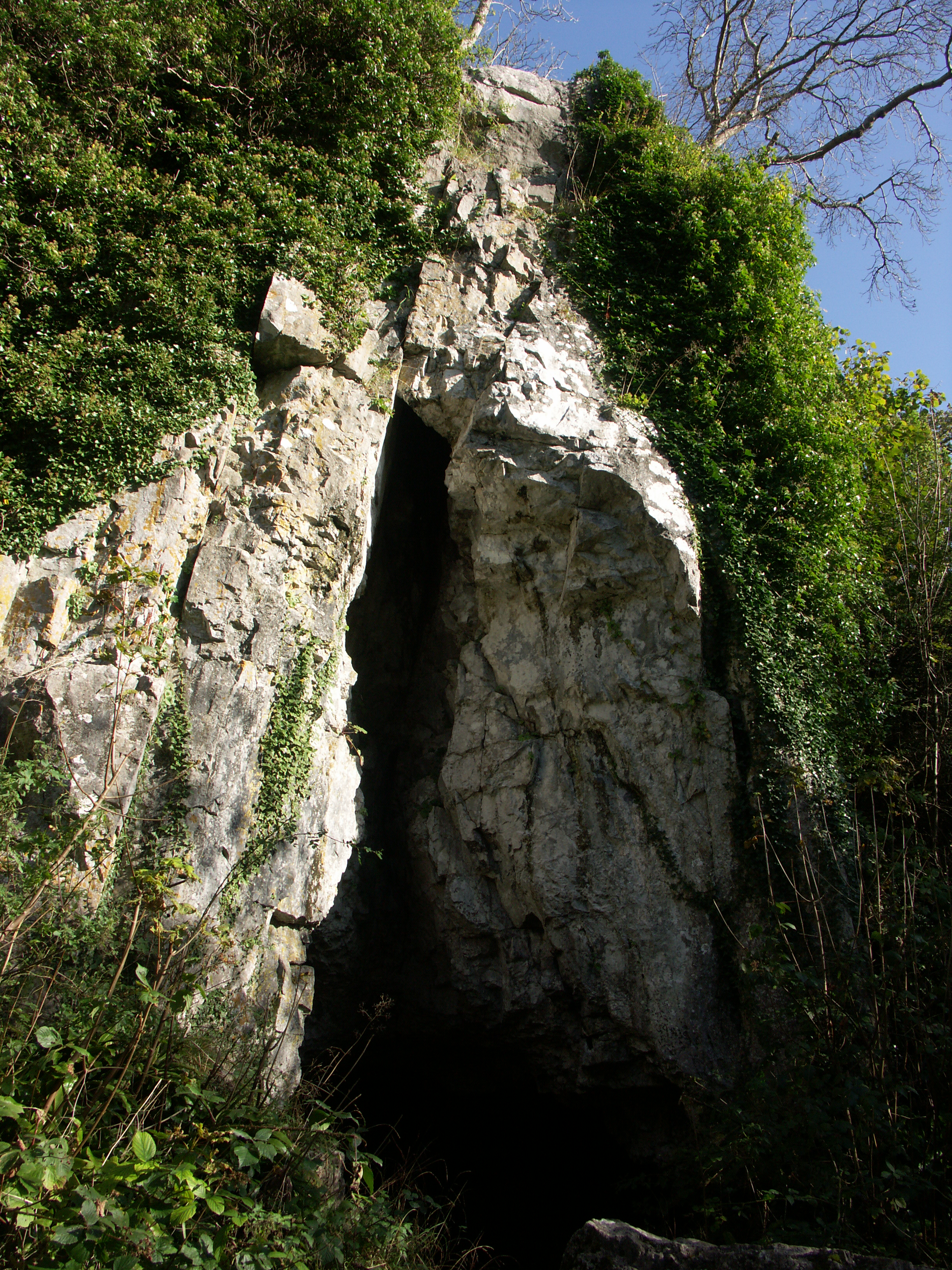
The Cathole Cave

The area that would become Parc le Breos has been inhabited by modern humans since the earliest times. The Cathole Cave – a steep, limestone outcrop, about 50 feet (15 m) from the floor of a dry narrow limestone gorge, now known as the Parc le Breos Cwm valley – has been used as a shelter by bands of Mesolithic hunters and as a Neolithic ossuary. The cave is a deep triangular fissure penetrating the hillside and narrowing towards the top. It has two entrances, with a natural platform outside the larger of the two. Excavations revealed two tanged points that may date to c. 28,000 years before present (BP), an interglacial period during the Late Pleistocene. Late glacial tool finds from the Upper Palaeolithic date to c. 12,000 BP. Animal remains were found at the same level as the Upper Palaeolithic tools, providing evidence of the climate c. 12,000 BP: red fox; Arctic fox; brown bear; tundra vole; and possibly reindeer. Animal remains excavated at the cave during the nineteenth century include mammoth, woolly rhinoceros, red deer and giant deer, which are yet to be accurately dated. Several finds date to the Bronze Age: a bronze socketed axe; two human skeletons; and sherds of pottery, from burial urns and other vessels.

Workmen digging for road stone in 1869 uncovered an early Neolithic cromlech built around 5850 BP – now known as Parc Cwm long cairn or Parc le Breos burial chamber (after the park) – about 200 yards (183 m) south of The Cathole Cave, along the Parc le Breos Cwm valley. An excavation later that year revealed human bones (now known to have belonged to at least 40 people), animal remains and Neolithic pottery. Identified in 1937 as one of the Severn-Cotswold type of megalithic chambered tomb, the cromlech was partly restored following an excavation during 1960–1961. North-West European lifestyles changed around 6,000 BP, from the nomadic lives of the hunter-gatherer, to a settled life of agricultural farming – the Neolithic Revolution. However, analysis of the human remains found at the cromlech show the tomb to have been accessed for up to 800 years and that the people interred within it continued to be either hunter-gatherers or herders, rather than agricultural farmers.

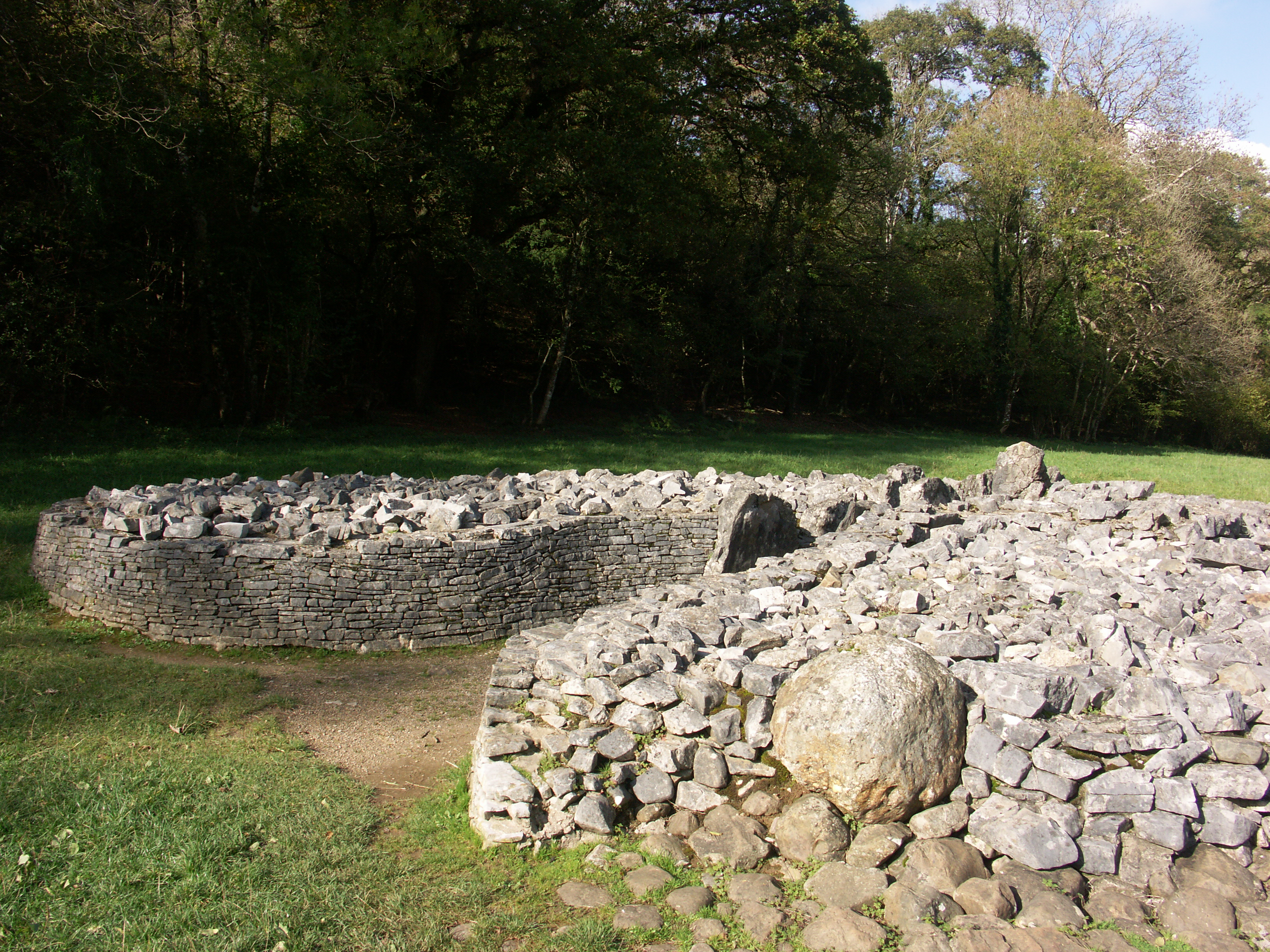
Parc Cwm long cairn forecourt – from the south east

A trapezoidal cairn of rubble – the upper part of the cromlech and its earth covering now removed – about 72 feet (22 m) long by 43 feet (13 m) (at its widest), is revetted by a low dry-stone wall. A bell-shaped, south-facing forecourt, formed by the wall, leads to a central passageway lined with limestone slabs set on end. Human remains had been placed in the two pairs of stone chambers that lead from the passageway. Corpses may have been placed in nearby caves until they decomposed, when the bones were moved to the tomb.

The Llethryd Tooth Cave, or Tooth Hole cave, is an Early Bronze Age ossuary site in a limestone cave, about 1,500 yards (1.4 km) north, northwest of the Parc Cwm long cairn cromlech, on private land along the Parc le Breos Cwm valley, near the village of Llethryd. The cave was rediscovered by cavers in 1961, who found human bones. The excavation carried out by D.P. Webley & J. Harvey in 1962 revealed the disarticulated remains (i.e. incomplete skeletons) of six adults and two children, dated to the Early Bronze Age or Beaker culture. Other contemporary finds, now held at the Amgueddfa Cymru–National Museum Wales, Cardiff, include collared urn pottery, flaked knives, a scraper, flint flakes, a bone spatula, a needle and bead, and animal bones – the remains of domesticated animals, including cat and dog. Archaeologists Alasdair Whittle and Michael Wysocki note that this period of occupation may be "significant", with respect to Parc Cwm long cairn, as it is "broadly contemporary with the secondary use of the tomb".

The cwmwd of Gŵyr, within the Cantref of Eginog and part of Ystrad Tywi, became part of the Kingdom of Deheubarth – founded by Hywel Dda (c. 920) from the Kingdoms of Dyfed and Seisyllwg. Henry de Beaumont, 1st Earl of Warwick conquered Gŵyr c. 1100, styling himself Lord of Gower. Southern Gower was colonised, and eventually became heavily anglicised. Rhys Gryg – fourth son of Rhys ap Gruffydd (The Lord Rhys) – of Deheubarth occupied the peninsula in 1215, but in 1220 he ceded the area to the English, apparently on the orders of Llywelyn ap Iorwerth. Before becoming a park, the area of Parc le Breos had been woodland. Its harvesting was implied on medieval rolls.

The Act of Union (1536) made the Lordship of Gower part of the historic county of Glamorgan, and the south-western section became the Hundred of Swansea.

A Hunting Lodge was built in the 19th century, about 1,200 yards (1,100 m) north east of Parc Cwm long cairn. It is now an hotel and pony trekking (horse riding) centre and retains the name Parc le Breos.

== Lunnon ==
The eastern half of Parc le Breos became a demesne farm – a manorial farm also known as a grange, probably in the late 13th century. Other than it being woodland in the 1220s, little more is known of the area until this time. The Lord of Gower's grange is noted on an account roll for 1337–8; as 'Grangia de Lunan'. – in which the village of Lunnon would be built.

During the mid 16th century the remainder of the park changed use too, from a deer park to farmland, when all but the limestone gorge cwm and about 500 acres of woodland was divided into three farms.

== Location ==
The remaining parkland of Parc le Breos is in Coed y Parc, about seven 1/2 miles (12 km) west south west of Swansea, Wales, in the southern part of central Gower Peninsula, between the villages of Llanrhidian and Bishopston (Llandeilo Ferwallt). Its nearest village is Parkmill, a small rural settlement about one-mile (1.6 km) to the south east.

Coed y Parc is owned and managed by Natural Resources Wales. Pedestrian access is allowed and is free, with free parking for 12–15 cars about 750 feet (230 m) from the site. On the opposite side of the lane to the car park a kissing gate, wide enough for a wheelchair to pass through, leads to an asphalt track running past the cromlech and the length of the gorge, allowing flat, disabled access to within about ten feet (3.0 m) of the cromlech. Parc Cwm long cairn is maintained by Cadw (to keep), the Welsh Assembly Government's historic environment division.

== Bibliography ==
Leighton, David K. 'A fresh look at Parc le Breos', Gower, 50 (1999), pp. 71–79, Publisher: Gower Society, ISSN 0962-0540.
