= The Final Curtain (film) =

- UK DVD cover
- Directed by: Patrick Harkins
- Written by: John Hodge
- Produced by: Christopher Young
- Starring: Peter O'Toole; Adrian Lester; Aidan Gillen
- Cinematography: Oliver Curtis
- Edited by: Scott Thomas; Justine Wright
- Music by: Mark Thomas
- Production companies: DNA Films; Young Crossbow Productions
- Distributed by: Universal Pictures International (through United International Pictures)
- Release date: 2002
- Running time: 85 mins
- Country: United Kingdom
- Language: English

The Final Curtain is a 2002 British film directed by Patrick Harkins and starring Peter O'Toole.

It tells the story of J. J. Curtis, an aging gameshow host played by O'Toole, who hires novelist Jonathan Stitch (Adrian Lester) to pen his autobiography, in the hope of sealing his immortality in the hearts and minds of the British public. This is made more difficult by his rivalry with fellow gameshow host Dave Turner (Aidan Gillen), and events from his past.

== Plot synopsis ==
The film begins with novelist Jonathan Stitch describing the story of veteran game show host and entertainer J. J. Curtis. Curtis receives the unwelcome news from his Harley Street doctor that he has cancer. Later that day while watching television, Curtis sees acclaimed novelist Jonathan Stitch's acceptance speech for an award he gained at a prestigious book awards ceremony. The speech that Stitch makes reminds Curtis of the fact that his time is short, and that immortality can be achieved through the printed word. Curtis then approaches Stitch and asks him to help him with the creation of a biography of his life. Stitch is initially reluctant, but is persuaded.

As Stitch delves into the veteran entertainer's life, he encounters some quite unsavory characteristics and events from the past, including the mysterious circumstances surrounding the injury of Monty Franklin, a fellow performer on a 1973 variety show bill. Stitch later tries to resign from the task, but having been tricked into believing Curtis's doctor to be a stalker, and having hit him with a dustbin lid outside Curtis's home (resulting in a coma from which he does not recover) Curtis threatens to reveal Stitch's role if he doesn't complete the book.

An increasingly bitter rivalry develops between Curtis and Dave Turner, host of a downmarket game show called Current Account, in which contestants are invited to subject family members to shocks of higher voltage in exchange for larger cash prizes. Turner was originally introduced to a TV audience by Curtis at a royal variety performance some years earlier, and he therefore resents Turner's challenge in both a ratings war and as competition for a deal to syndicate their respective shows in America.

== Cast ==
- Peter O'Toole as J.J. Curtis
- Adrian Lester as Jonathan Stitch
- Aidan Gillen as Dave Turner
- Julia Sawalha as Karen Willet
- Ralph Brown as Timothy
- Daniel Browne as Game Show Contestant
