= Alien Love Triangle =

- Directed by: Danny Boyle
- Written by: John Hodge
- Produced by: Andrew Macdonald
- Starring: Kenneth Branagh; Alice Connor; Courteney Cox; Heather Graham
- Cinematography: Brian Tufano
- Edited by: Tariq Anwar
- Music by: Simon Boswell
- Distributed by: Miramax/Dimension Films
- Release date: 2008
- Running time: 30 minutes
- Country: United Kingdom
- Language: English

Alien Love Triangle is a 2008 comedy-science fiction short film directed by Danny Boyle and written by John Hodge. It was filmed in 1999.

The film was originally intended to be one of a trilogy of 30-minute short films shown together. However, the two other films, Mimic and Impostor, were turned into full-length features, and the project was canceled.

The film had its world premiere as part of the closing ceremony of the smallest theatre in the UK, La Charrette, on 23 February 2008, an event organised by Mark Kermode of The Culture Show. Kenneth Branagh attended the screening. After this, there were two other recorded screenings of this film. The first was at the National Media Museum shortly after the premiere, again with Branagh in attendance, and the second on 28 October 2023 at the FilmBath Festival, with Danny Boyle and John Hodge in attendance.

== Premise ==
Steven Chesterman is a scientist who has created a teleportation device and hopes to use it for various purposes. He then goes home to his wife to share the news, but he learns she has a surprise for him: she is from outer space. It leads to a string of unusual events where beings from space come to visit Chesterman and his friends and show that all is not as things seem.

== Cast ==
- Kenneth Branagh as Steven Chesterman
- Alice Connor as Sarah
- Courteney Cox as Alice
- Heather Graham as Elizabeth
