= Alice Connor =

British actress

- Born: Alice Rose Connor; 2 August 1990 (age 35); Buckinghamshire, England
- Years active: 1998–present

Alice Rose Connor (born 2 August 1990) is a British actress, born in Buckinghamshire, England. She is best known for her roles in the television adaptation of Jacqueline Wilson's novel The Illustrated Mum, in the children's television series The New Worst Witch (a spin-off from The Worst Witch), and in the film The Thief Lord as Hornet. She first started acting as herself in Fun Song Factory. She also had a small part in the 2001 movie A Knight's Tale. Alice Connor also starred in the programme My Spy Family as Elle Bannon, which was shown on Boomerang in the UK. She also attended the Misbourne School. She is the granddaughter of actor Kenneth Connor.

She is currently the Artistic and Executive Director at The Theatre Shed.

== Filmography ==
Year	Film	Role	Notes
1998	Fun Song Factory	Herself	7 episodes
1998	Coming Home	Young Jess	TV series
2008	Alien Love Triangle	Sarah	Short
2001	A Knight's Tale	Lone Girl in Cheapside	
2002	Crime and Punishment	Polya	
2004–2005	UGetMe	Mia	
2003	The Illustrated Mum	Dolphin Westward	
2004	Fungus the Bogeyman	Voice of Mucus	
2005–2006	The New Worst Witch	Henrietta "Hettie" Hubble	
2006	The Thief Lord	Hornet	
2007–2009	My Spy Family	Elle Bannon	TV series
2009	Po5t	Ange	Spice Girls video Young Posh Spice
2010	Coming of Age	Snooty Bitch	BBC TV Series
2011	Hotel Trubble	Jenny Montenny	
2017	Call the Midwife	Lucy Chen	Series 6, episode 3
