= Parc Cwm long cairn =

Burial chamber in Wales

- carn hir Parc Cwm (Welsh)
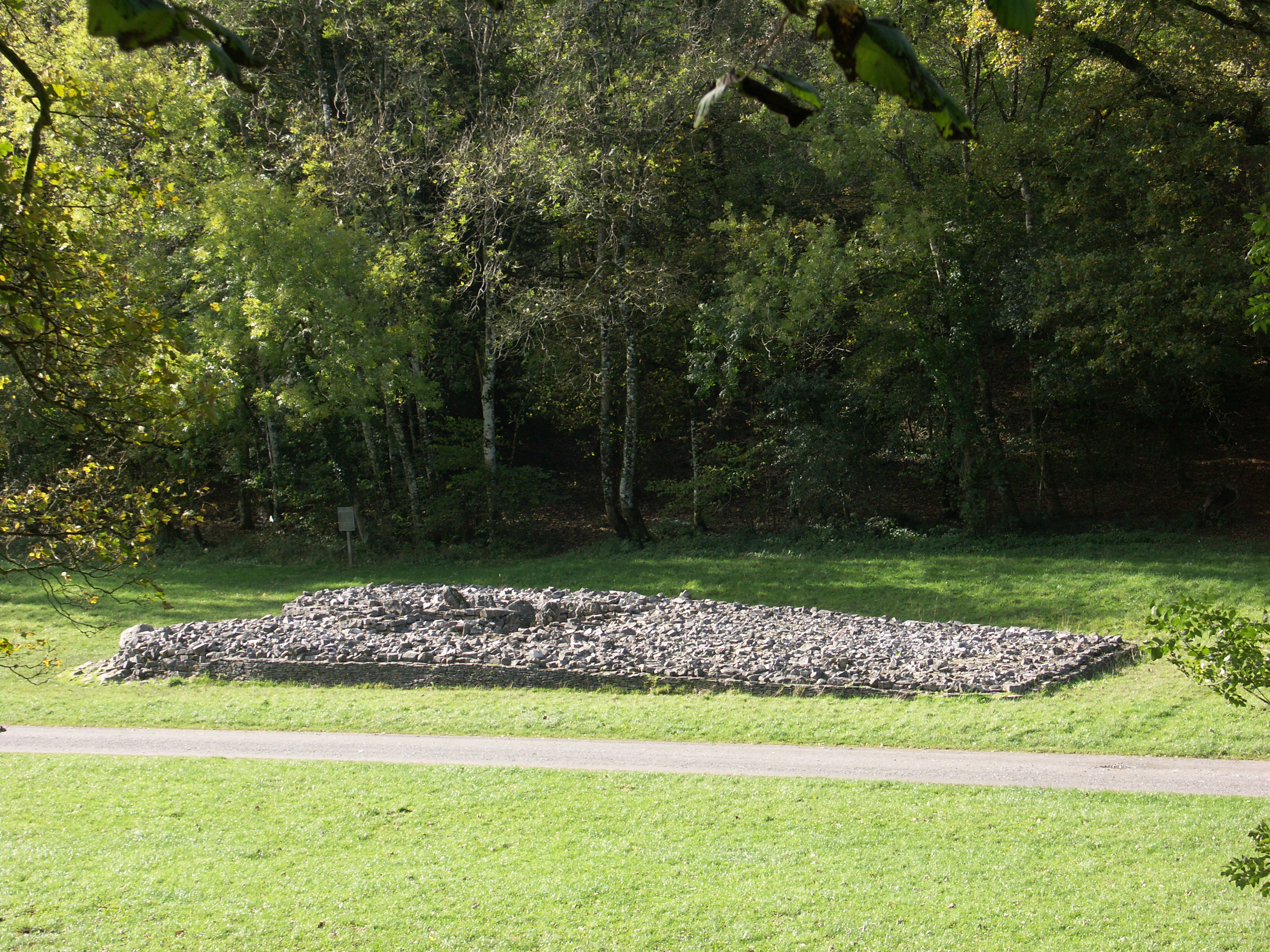
- Interactive map of Parc Cwm long cairn
- 51°35′18″N 4°06′45″W
- Type: chambered tomb
- Periods: Neolithic
- Location: near Parkmill, Gower
- Region: City and County of Swansea, Wales

History
- Built: c. 3900 BC

Site notes
- Discovered: 1869
- Condition: nearly intact

Parc Cwm long cairn (Welsh: carn hir Parc Cwm), also known as Parc le Breos burial chamber (siambr gladdu Parc le Breos), is a partly restored Neolithic chambered tomb, identified in 1937 as a Severn-Cotswold type of chambered long barrow. The cromlech, a megalithic burial chamber, was built around 5,850 years before present (BP), during the early Neolithic. It is about seven 1/2 miles (12 km) west south–west of Swansea, Wales, in what is now known as Coed y Parc Cwm at Parc le Breos, on the Gower Peninsula.

A trapezoidal cairn of rubble – the upper part of the cromlech and its earth covering now removed – about 72 feet (22 m) long by 43 feet (13 m) (at its widest), is revetted by a low dry-stone wall. A bell-shaped, south-facing forecourt, formed by the wall, leads to a central passageway lined with limestone slabs set on end. Human remains had been placed in the two pairs of stone chambers that lead from the passageway. Corpses may have been placed in nearby caves until they decomposed, when the bones were moved to the tomb.

The cromlech was discovered in 1869 by workmen digging for road stone. An excavation later that year revealed human bones (now known to have belonged to at least 40 people), animal remains, and Neolithic pottery. Samples from the site show the tomb to have been in use for between 300 and 800 years. North-West European lifestyles changed around 6000 BP, from the nomadic lives of the hunter-gatherer, to a settled life of agricultural farming: the Neolithic Revolution. However, analysis of the human remains found at Parc Cwm long cairn show the people interred in the cromlech continued to be either hunter-gatherers or herders, rather than agricultural farmers.

Parc Cwm long cairn lies in a former medieval deer park, established in the 1220s CE by the Marcher Lord of Gower as Parc le Breos – an enclosed area of about 2,000 acres (810 ha), now mainly farmland. The cromlech is on the floor of a dry narrow limestone gorge containing about 500 acres (2.0 km^{2}) of woodland. Free pedestrian access is via an asphalt track leading from the park's entrance, which has free parking for 12–15 cars about 250 yards (230 m) from the site. Parc Cwm long cairn is maintained by Cadw, the Welsh Government's historic environment division.

== History ==
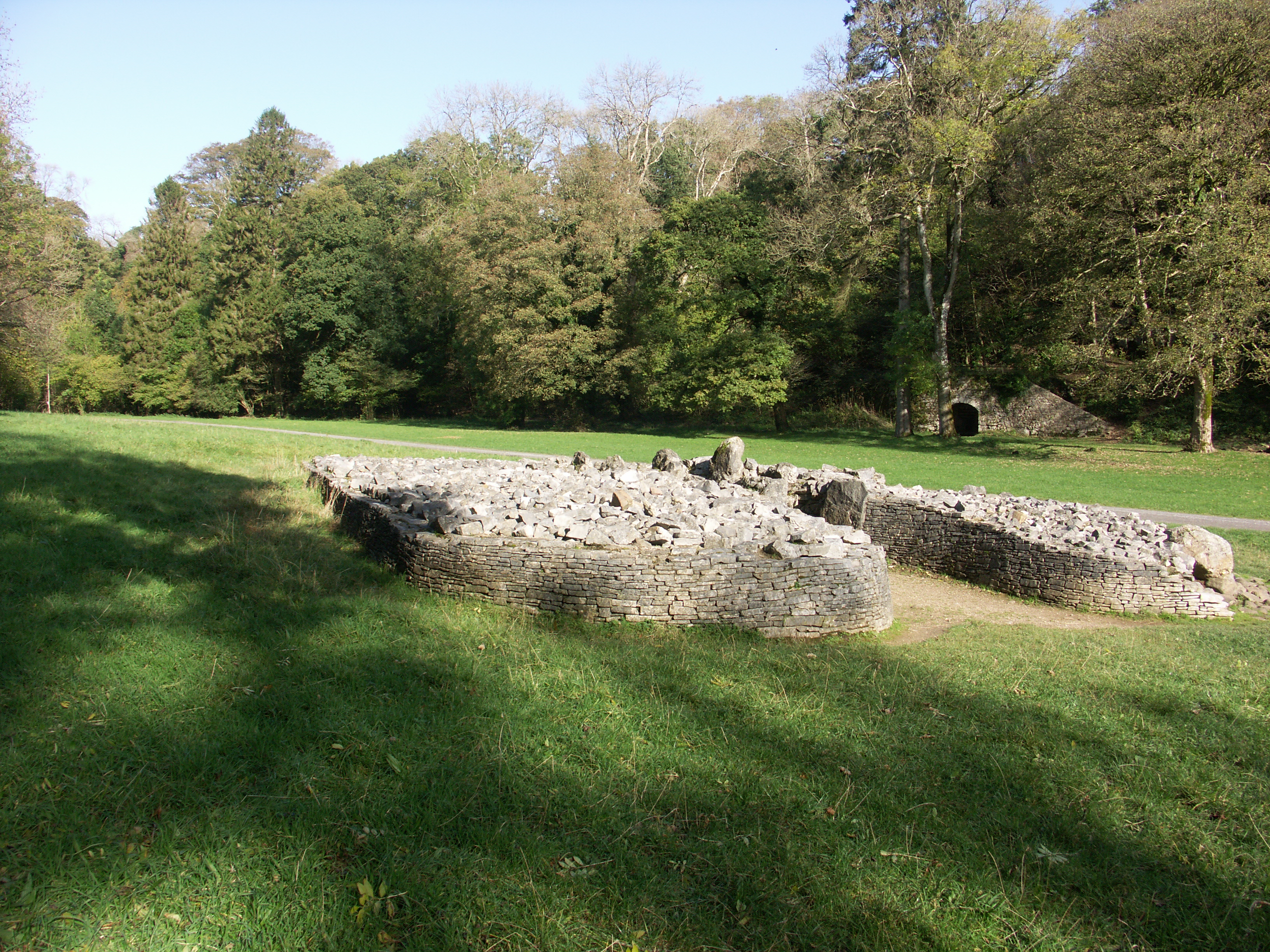
Parc Cwm long cairn from the south west

From the end of the last ice age (between 12,000 and 10,000 BP) Mesolithic hunter-gatherers began to migrate northwards from Central Europe; the area that would become known as Wales was free of glaciers by about 10,250 BP. At that time sea levels were much lower than today, and the shallower parts of what is now the North Sea were dry land. The east coast of present-day England and the coasts of present-day Denmark, Germany and the Netherlands were connected by the former landmass known as Doggerland, forming the British Peninsula on the European mainland. The post-glacial rise in sea level separated Wales and Ireland, forming the Irish Sea. Doggerland was submerged by the North Sea and, by 8000 BP, the British Peninsula had become an island. By the beginning of the Neolithic (6,000 BP) sea levels in the Bristol Channel were still about 33 feet (10 m) lower than today. Historian John Davies has theorised that the story of Cantre'r Gwaelod's drowning, and tales in the Mabinogion of the water between Wales and Ireland being narrower and shallower, may be distant folk memories of that time. The warmer climate caused major changes to the flora and fauna of Great Britain, and encouraged the growth of dense forest that covered 80–90% of the island.

Human lifestyles in North-West Europe changed around 6000 BP; from the Mesolithic (Middle Stone Age) nomadic lives of hunting and gathering, to the Neolithic (New Stone Age) agrarian life of agriculture and settlement. John Davies notes that such a transformation cannot have been developed by the people living in North-West Europe independently, as neither the grain necessary for crops nor the animals suitable for domestication are indigenous to the area. Recent genetic studies conclude that these cultural changes were introduced to Britain by farmers migrating from the European mainland. They cleared the forests to establish pasture and to cultivate the land, developed new technologies such as ceramics and textile production, and used a similar tradition of long barrow construction that began in continental Europe during the 7th millennium BP – the free standing megalithic structures supporting a sloping capstone (known as dolmens), common across Atlantic Europe that were, according to John Davies, "the first substantial, permanent constructions of man". Such massive constructions would have needed a large labour force (up to 200 men) suggestive of large communities nearby. However, in his contribution to History of Wales, 25,000 BC AD 2000, archaeologist Joshua Pollard notes that not all Neolithic communities were part of the simultaneous "marked transformations in material culture, ideology and technical practices" known as the Neolithic Revolution.

== Severn-Cotswold tombs ==
The cromlech at Parc le Breos Cwm is one of 120–30 sites identified as belonging to the category of long barrow tomb known as the Severn-Cotswold or Cotswold-Severn group. Excavations show these tombs to have been built on sites that had already "gained some significance". Archaeologist Julian Thomas theorises that these sites may have been "very long-lived woodland clearances" that had become landmarks and meeting-places.

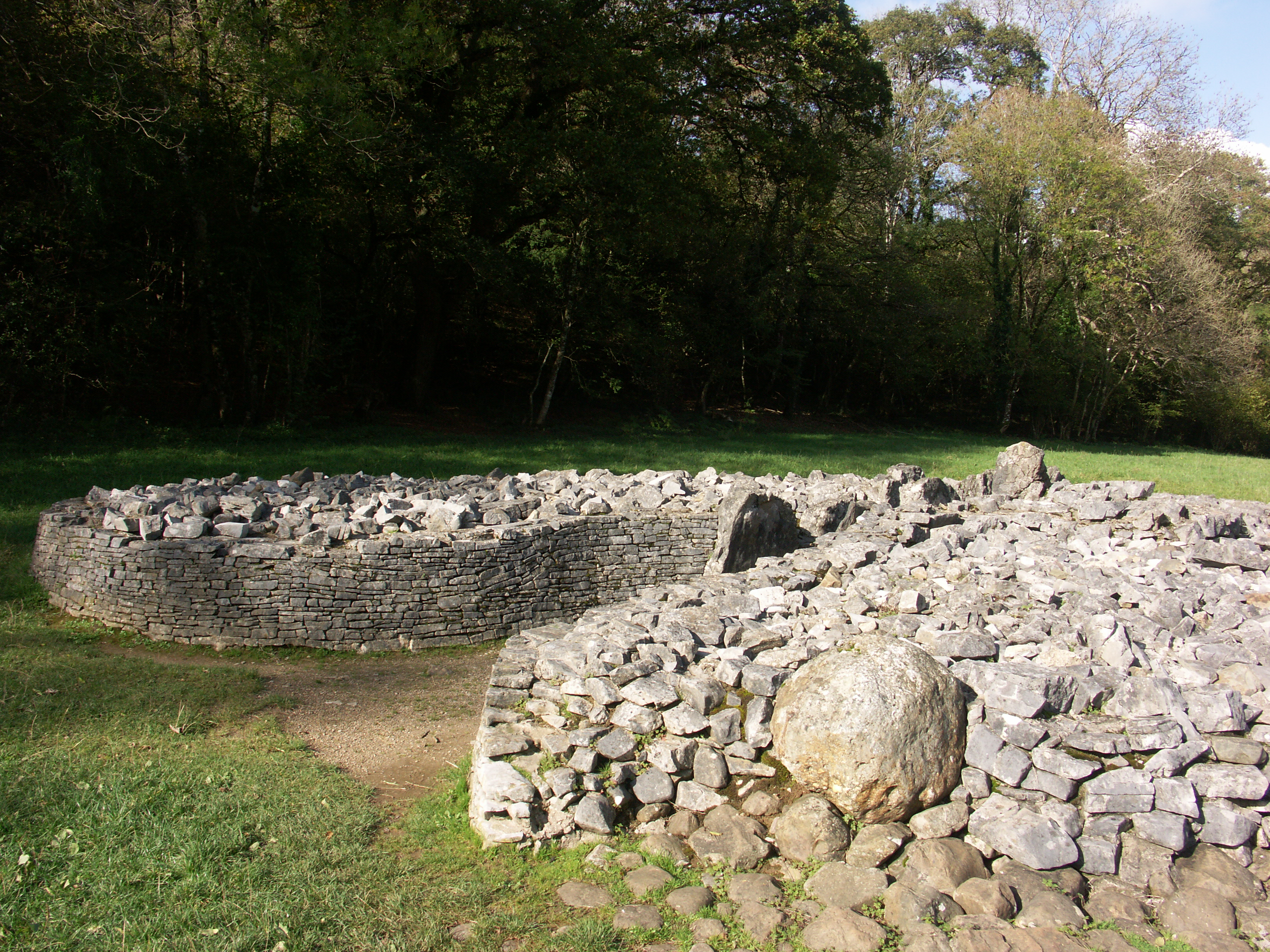
Parc Cwm long cairn forecourt – from the south east

Constructed during the Neolithic, cairns in the Severn-Cotswold tradition share several characteristics: an elongated trapezoidal (or wedge) shape up to 328 feet (100 m) long; a cairn (a mound of deliberately placed stones or rocks erected as a memorial or marker); a revetment (retaining wall) of carefully constructed dry-stone walling that also defines a horned forecourt at the widest end; huge capstones supported by orthostats; and a chamber (or chambers) in which human remains were placed, accessible after the cairn was completed by way of a gallery (passageway). Diverse internal transept chamber plans exist within the group. The earlier tombs contained multiple chambers set laterally, or pairs of transept chambers leading from a central passageway; the later, terminally chambered tombs, contained a single chamber.

As the name implies, Severn-Cotswold cairns are concentrated mainly to the east of the River Severn, in and around the Cotswolds, in present-day England. However, similar Severn-Cotswold type structures have been identified in south east Wales – between Brecon, Gower and Gwent – and in Capel Garmon (near Betws-y-Coed, Conwy, north Wales), Wayland's Smithy (Oxfordshire, England) and Avebury (Wiltshire, England). As well as monuments to house and to honour their departed ancestors, these cromlechs may have been communal and ceremonial sites where, according to archaeologist Francis Pryor, people met "to socialise, to meet new partners, to acquire fresh livestock and to exchange ceremonial gifts".

Parc Cwm long cairn is one of six chambered tombs discovered on Gower and one of 17 in what is commonly known as Glamorgan. Severn-Cotswold cairns are the oldest surviving examples of architecture in Great Britain – Parc Cwm long cairn was built about 1,500 to 1,300 years before either Stonehenge or the Great Pyramid of Giza, Egypt was completed.

== Features ==
Site plan: 1 Coursed, dry-stone kerb revettment; 2 Cairn of rocks and cobbles; 3 Sill; 4 Passageway; 5 Transept chamber; 6 Forecourt; 7 Rubble from collapsed wall

The megalithic cromlech at Parc le Breos Cwm, known as Parc Cwm long cairn (carn hir Parc Cwm), is a Severn-Cotswold type chambered tomb, built around 5850 BP (during the early Neolithic) in what is now known as Gower – about eight miles (13 km) west of Swansea, Wales, and about 1 1/4 miles (2 km) north of the Bristol Channel. Alternative names include Parc le Breos burial chamber (siambr gladdu Parc le Breos), the Long Cairn and the Giant's Grave.

The cromlech consists of a north–south aligned long mound of locally obtained rocks and cobbles, mainly of limestone, revetted by two coursed, dry-stone kerbs of "a fine standard". The inner wall was built using a heavier stone. Trapezoid-shaped and about 72 feet (22 m) long, the cromlech tapers from 43 feet (13 m) wide at its southern entrance to about 20 feet (6 m) at its northern end. The wall at the front, right section, is missing or has collapsed, and the rubble has tumbled out leaving a previously covered orthostat exposed.

At the entrance to the tomb the kerbs sweep inwards to form a pair of deep protrusions, or horns, forming a narrow bell-shaped forecourt. A straight central passageway (or gallery), 21 feet (6 m) long by 3 feet (1 m) wide, orientated north–south, leads from the forecourt into the cairn. Each side of the passageway is lined with thin limestone slabs known as orthostats, placed on end and up to 5 feet (1.5 m) high with a coursed dry-stone infill between the slabs. Two pairs of rectangular transept chambers lead from the passageway, averaging 5 1/2 feet (1.6 m), east–west, by 3 1/4 feet (1.0 m); or "6 ft by 2 ft", according to Archaeologia Cambrensis in 1886. Each, except the south west chamber, has shallow limestone sillstones at its entrance.

Archaeologist R J C Atkinson believed that (unusually among cairns in the Severn-Cotswold tradition) Parc Cwm long cairn had been built beside a stream that now flows underground. He noted that the stones on the eastern side had "marked signs of erosion and rounding by silt-laden flood-water".

Originally, the transept chambers would have been covered with one large (or several smaller) capstones, enclosing the chambers containing human remains. The earth covering and the upper part of the cromlech have been removed, leaving the passageway and lateral chambers fully exposed. There is no record of a capstone having been discovered.

== Excavation ==
Workmen digging for road stone discovered the site in 1869. John Lubbock and Hussey Vivian excavated it that year, believing it to be a round barrow. The excavation revealed human bones that were "much broken and in no regular arrangement", animal remains ("deer and swine's teeth"), and sherds of "plain Western Neolithic pottery". The bones, initially thought to heve been disturbed by repeated access or subsequent interments, were at first thought to be from 20 to 24 individuals, all of whom except three were adults. Archaeologists Alasdair Whittle and Michael Wysocki note that such estimates were commonly based on the "numbers of skulls or mandibles", and recent analysis has shown the bones to be from at least 40 individuals. Following the excavation, most of the human remains were reburied in clay pots beneath their original contexts, some are held in the Ashmolean Museum, University of Oxford, England – with the animal and pottery remains – and the whereabouts of the remainder are unrecorded.

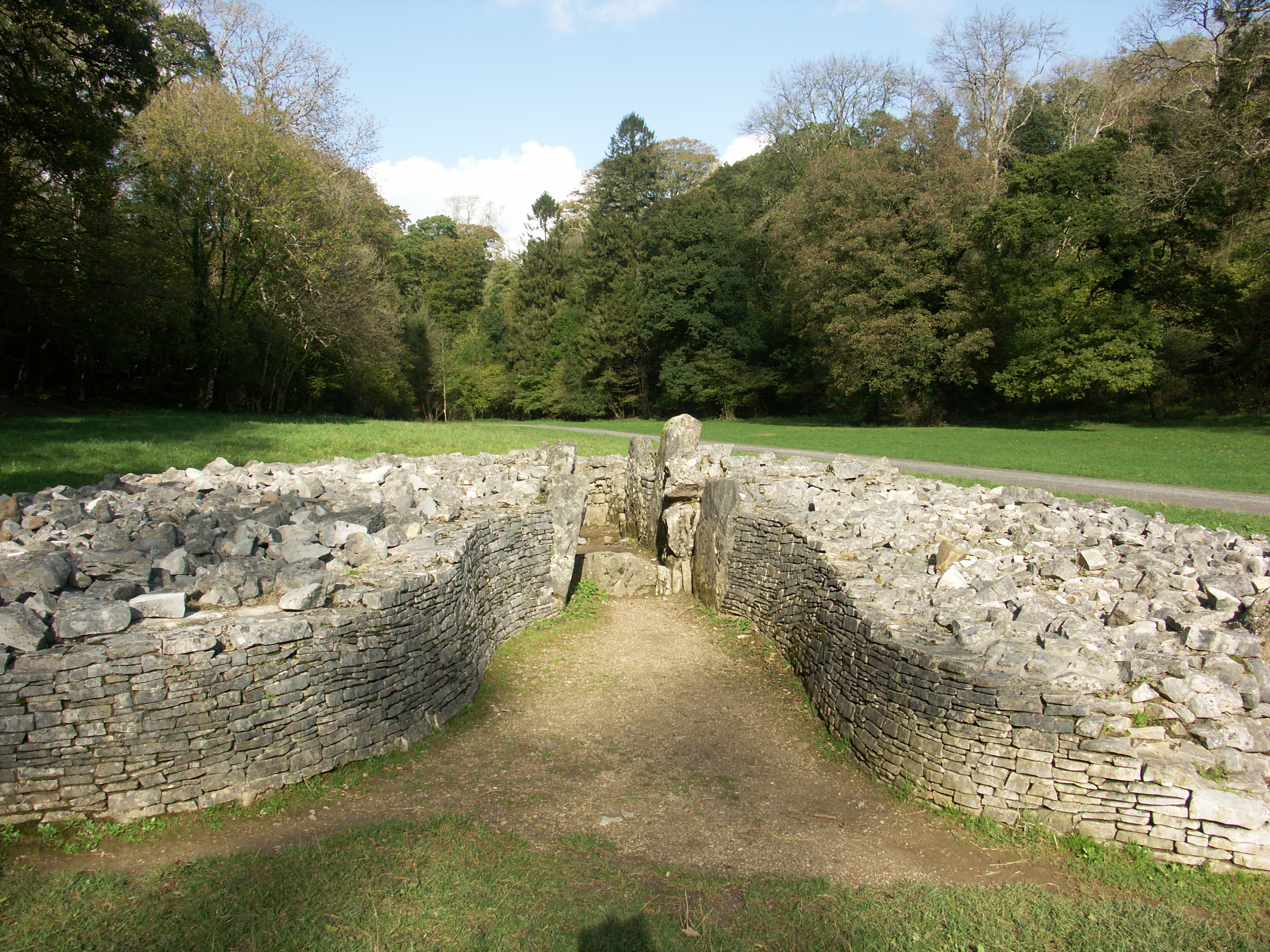
Parc Cwm long cairn from the south

An excavation led by Professor Glyn Daniel in 1937 identified the site as a chambered long barrow. However, more recently, long barrows have been defined as having long earthen mounds with wooden internal structures, whereas chambered tombs, while also being covered by a long mound, have internal chambers built of stone. No long barrows with wooden internal structures have been identified in southeast Wales, perhaps because long barrows were usually built where there was no suitable stone.

At Parc Cwm long cairn a variety of mortuary practices was evident and the deliberate ordering of skeletal parts noticeable. Whittle and Wysocki (1998) note cremated human remains were placed only in the front, right (south–east) chamber, where females and males, and all age ranges were represented. The south–east chamber was also unusual in that it contained nearly three times as many individuals as in each of the other chambers, which contained the remains of all representative groups except younger children and infants. At the forecourt entrance Atkinson recorded finds, deposited in groups, including: flint debitage, lithic cores and a bladelet (burnt and unburnt); a leaf-shaped arrowhead (burnt); pieces of quartz; pieces of stalactite (now missing); sherds of Neolithic pottery; and cremated bone fragments. Atkinson speculated that the stalactite originated from Cat Hole cave, which (along with Tooth Hole cave) Whittle and Wysocki note as a possible source of the quartz too.

Following the excavation led by R J C Atkinson in 1960, the cromlech was placed under the guardianship of the then Ministry of Public Building and Works and, in 1961, was partly restored. Atkinson made "minimal" excavation records, and no report of it was published until Whittle and Wysocki's detailed report in 1998. In it, they suggest that corpses may have been placed in caves near the cromlech until they decomposed, when the bones were moved to the tomb; a process known as excarnation.

== Analysis ==
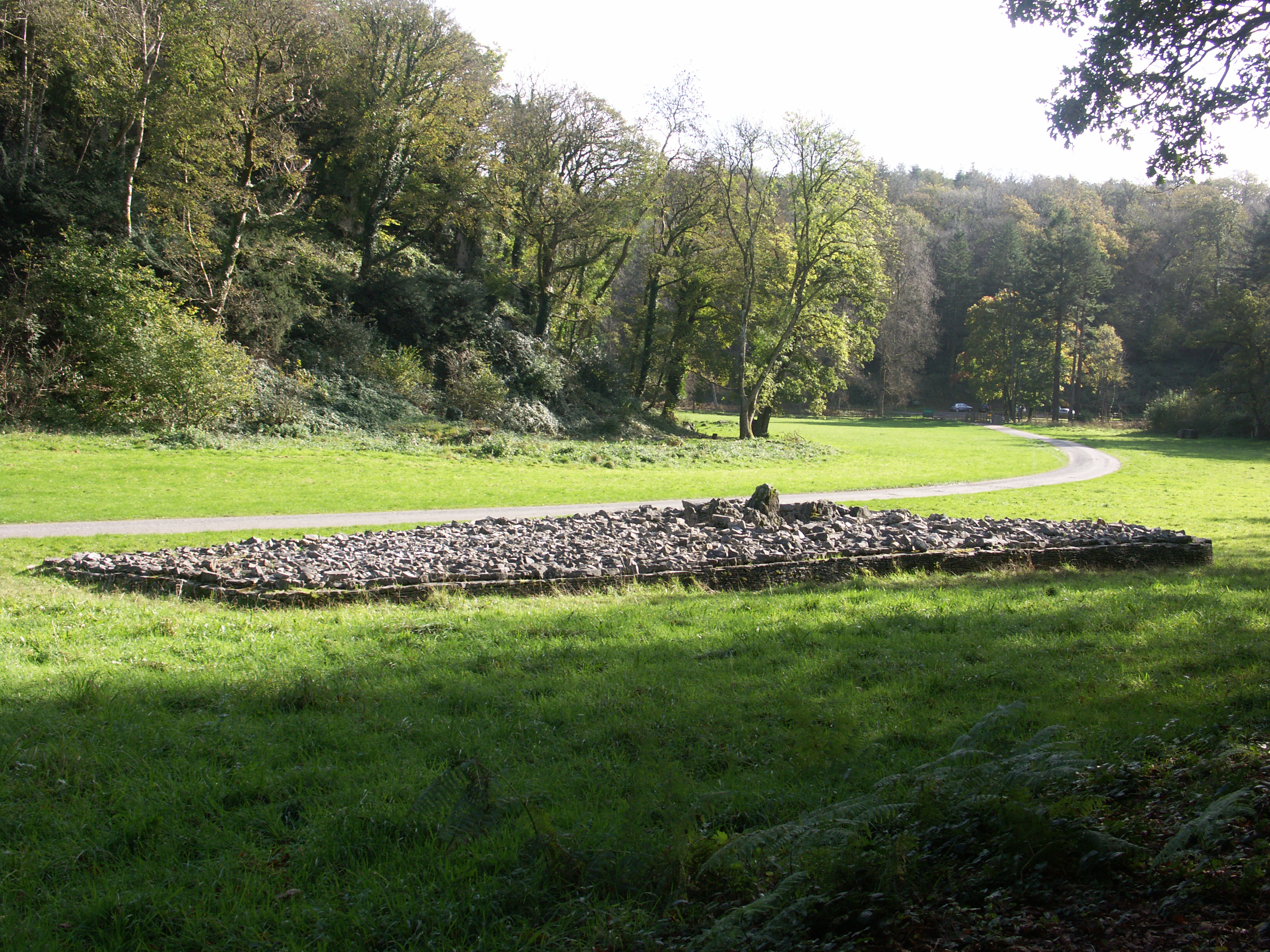
Parc Cwm long cairn – from the north west

Few human remains survive in Great Britain from the early Neolithic (c. 6400–c. 5850 BP), although they are comparatively well preserved in the Black Mountains (Mynydd Du), Gower and the Vale of Glamorgan (Bro Morgannwg) where up to 50 individuals have been interred – men, women and children – in each cromlech.

The skeletal remains of over 40 individuals were recovered from the cromlech at Parc le Breos Cwm, some of which showed evidence of weathering and of biting and gnawing by animals. This suggests the corpses lay exposed to decompose and were interred in the burial chambers defleshed, as parcels of bone. Skeletal remains from the passageway were part–articulated, showing no sign of animal scavenging, suggesting they were placed in the cromlech as fleshed corpses. Whittle and Wysocki note that among the human remains are the bones of "8 dogs, a cat, a red deer, pig, sheep and cattle". They speculate that the two caves near the cromlech were used as depositories for the corpses prior to decomposition, and that when the bones were collected from the caves for reinterment others already lying in the cave were unwittingly gathered too.

Radiocarbon dated samples from the cromlech show the tomb was accessed by many generations over a period of 300–800 years, and that the human bones are the disarticulated remains (i.e., not complete skeletons) of at least 40 individuals: male and female adults, adolescents, children, and infants. One of the red deer bones has been radiocarbon dated to between 2750 BP and 2150 BP, showing that at least some of the bones entered long after the site had been deserted.

=== Lifestyle indicators ===
Examination of the bones from which stature could be estimated, indicate that the male mortuary population were "big men" – the 1869 report notes males of "gigantic proportions" – whereas the females were "short and gracile". Pollard notes that males analysed from Parc Cwm long cairn were "particularly robust" when compared to females.

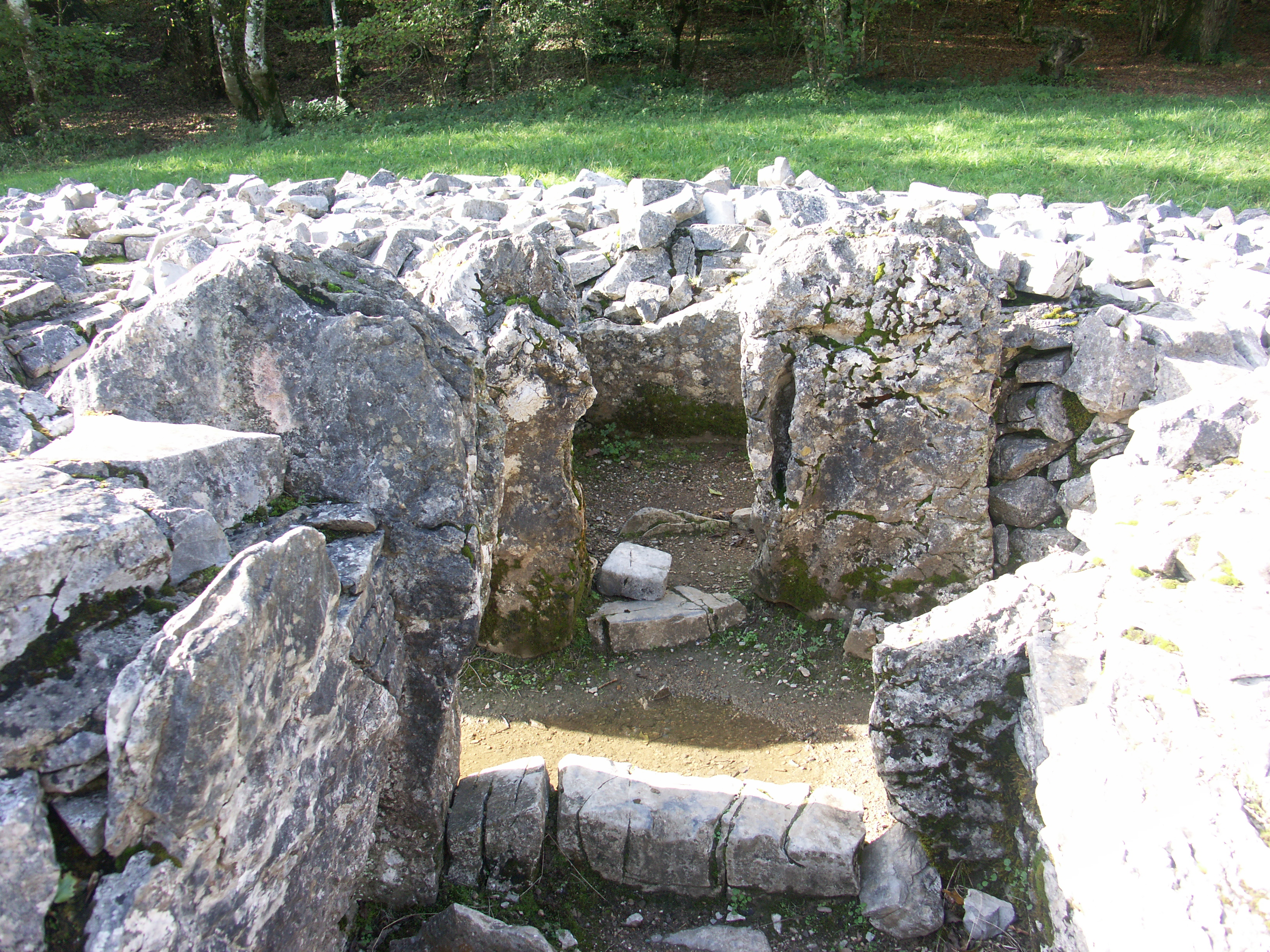
Parc Cwm long cairn (southern transepts chambers) from the east (front, right), across the passageway

Prior to the publication of Whittle and Wysocki's 1998 report, bones and teeth of the mortuary population of Parc Cwm long cairn were re-examined for indications of lifestyle and diet.

Musculoskeletal analysis showed significant gender lifestyle variation. Greater leg muscle development was found in males of the Parc Cwm cromlech, possibly the result of hunting or herding, confirming the sexual dimorphism found in previous analyses of the remains. In contrast, no such variation was noticeable in the remains found during excavations from other nearby sites, for example the Tinkinswood burial chamber, in the Vale of Glamorgan. The variation in musculoskeletal stress markers may indicate a mobile lifestyle for at least some of the males analysed.

Evidence obtained from stable isotope analysis shows plant foods, including cereals, formed only a small proportion of their dietary protein. The majority derived from animals – i.e., meat, and milk or blood – and contained none from marine sources.

Remains of human teeth were analysed for evidence of arrested development and decay. Arrested development implies periods of nutritional shortage, which could indicate failed harvests. Decay implies either periods of food shortage, or a diet consisting of high proportions of carbohydrate or softer cooked meat, or both. Dental analyses showed no sign of periods of decay or arrested development, even where there was "considerable wear", indicating a lifestyle that was not dependent on farming cereals. The 1887 bone report notes the "good condition of the teeth". Whittle and Wysocki noted the "slight" presence of tartar, and that only one tooth had been lost before death, a mandibular incisor.

Whittle and Wysocki conclude, from the skeletal and dental analyses, that the lifestyles of the people who were to be interred in the cromlech either continued to be one of hunting and gathering or, more likely, a pastoral life of herding, rather than one of agrarian-based farming.

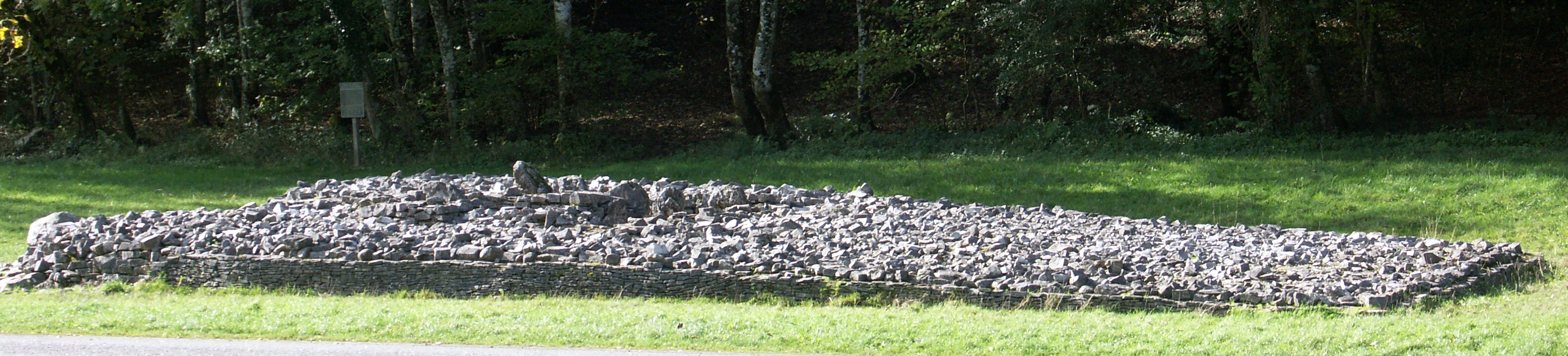
Parc Cwm long cairn – from the north east

== Cathole Cave ==
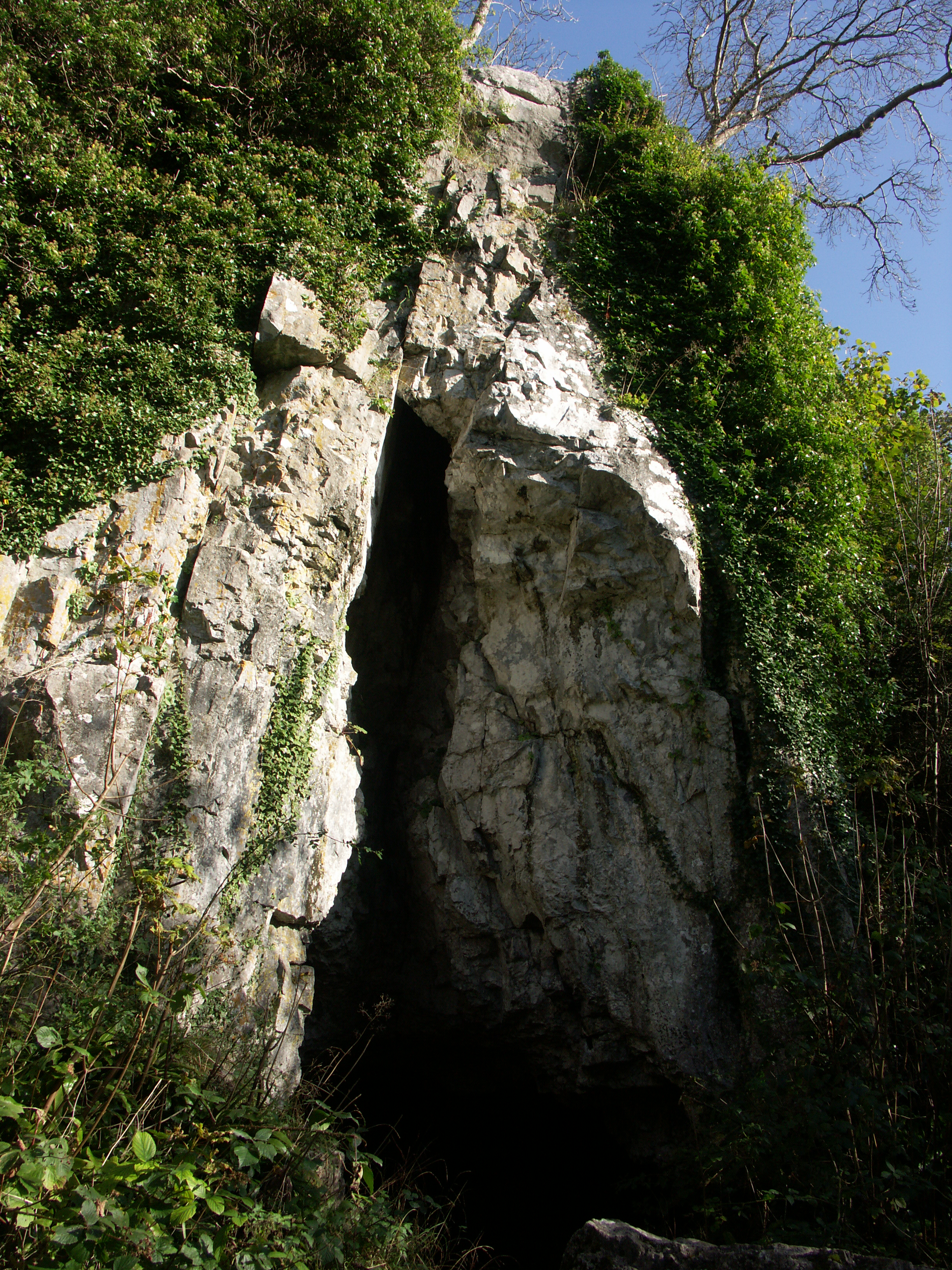
Cathole Cave

The Cathole Cave, Cat Hole Cave or Cathole Rock Cave, is a steep limestone outcrop, about 200 yards (180 m) north of the cromlech along the Parc le Breos Cwm valley and near the top of the gorge, about 50 feet (15 m) from the valley floor. The cave is a deep triangular fissure penetrating the hillside and narrowing towards the top. It has two entrances, with a natural platform outside the larger of the two.

The cave was used as a shelter by bands of Mesolithic hunters and as a Neolithic ossuary. During the first excavation of the cave in 1864, finds were made only from the Mesolithic to medieval periods. In his "The Proceedings of the Prehistoric Society vol.25 (1959), pp. 260–69", archaeologist Charles McBurney notes that "In the Post Glacial period the cave was much used by Mesolithic hunters"; a conclusion confirmed by John Campbell's excavation of 1977.

A 1984 excavation by Aldhouse-Green revealed the earliest finds from the cave, two tanged points that may date to c. 28,000 BP, an interglacial period during the Late Pleistocene roughly contemporaneous with the Red Lady of Paviland. The "lady" was discovered in a cave between Port Eynon and Rhossili, about eight miles (13 km) west of Cathole Cave, and has been radiocarbon dated to c. 29,000 BP, the oldest known human burial in Great Britain.

Rock art from the Upper Paleolithic, thought to represent a reindeer, was discovered on the back wall of Cathole Cave in September 2010. The engraving, measuring approximately 15 x 11 cm, has been radiocarbon dated to 14,505 ± 560 BP. According to George Nash, the archeologist who made the discovery, it is "the oldest rock art in the British Isles, if not north-western Europe".

Late glacial tool finds from the Upper Palaeolithic date to c. 12,000 BP: flint blades known as Cheddar points; smaller bladelets known as Cresswell points; scrapers; burins or lithic flakes; flint and bone awls; and a bone needle. Flint rarely occurs in Wales other than in drifts, or as small pebbles on beaches. Flint tools would therefore have to have been brought to Gower from other areas, such as those now known as southern or eastern England, or County Antrim, either as finished tools or as incomplete, or unworked, nodules. Remains of red fox, Arctic fox, brown bear, tundra vole, and possibly reindeer, were found at the same level as the Upper Palaeolithic tools, providing evidence of the climate c. 12,000 BP. Other animal remains excavated during the 19th century, which may predate the Late glacial finds, include mammoth, woolly rhinoceros, red deer and giant deer.

Several finds date to the Bronze Age, including a bronze socketed axe, two human skeletons, and sherds of pottery from burial urns and other vessels.

== Llethryd Tooth Cave ==
An excavation of the Llethryd Tooth Cave, or Tooth Hole cave, a Bronze Age ossuary site at a cave about 1,500 yards (1.4 km) north, north west of the cromlech, was carried out by D. P. Webley and J. Harvey in 1962. It revealed the disarticulated remains of six people, dated to the Early Bronze Age or Beaker culture. Other contemporary finds, now held at the Amgueddfa Cymru–National Museum Wales, Cardiff, include collared urn pottery, flaked knives, a scraper, flint flakes, a bone spatula, a needle and bead, and animal bones – the remains of domesticated animals, including cat and dog. Whittle and Wysocki note that this period of occupation may be "significant", with respect to Parc Cwm long cairn, as it is "broadly contemporary with the secondary use of the tomb".

== Location ==
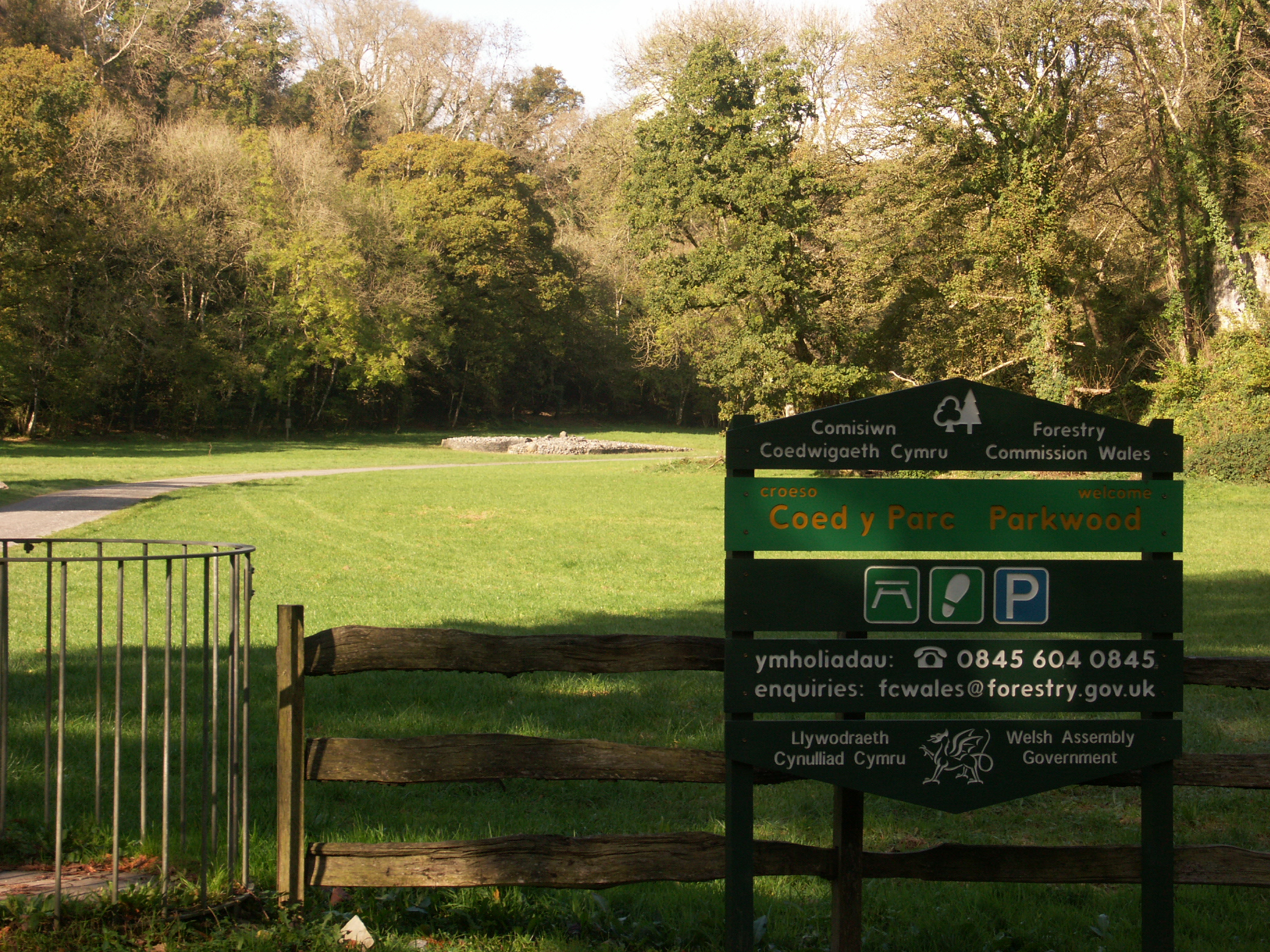
Parc Cwm long cairn from the entrance of Coed y Parc

The Neolithic cromlech at Parc le Breos is about seven 1/2 miles (12 km) west south–west of Swansea, Wales, near the centre of Gower, midway between the villages of Llanrhidian and Bishopston. Its nearest village is Parkmill, a small rural settlement about one mile (1.6 km) to the south–east.

Parc Cwm long cairn lies on the floor of a dry, narrow, limestone gorge, at an elevation of about 50 feet (15 m) above sea level, less than 1 1/4 miles (2 km) from the south coast of Gower. It is in about 500 acres (200 ha) of woodland called Coed y Parc, the remnants of a former medieval deer park (Parc le Breos) from which the cromlech derives its alternative name: Parc le Breos burial chamber. Established as an enclosed area of about 2,000 acres (810 ha) by John de Braose, Marcher Lord of Gower, in about 1221–32 CE, the park is now mainly farmland. A 19th-century hunting lodge about 1,200 yards (1.1 km) north–east of Parc Cwm long cairn has been converted into a hotel and pony trekking (horse riding) centre called Parc le Breos.

Coed y Parc is owned and managed by Natural Resources Wales. The site is open to the public free of charge and has parking for 12–15 cars about 750 feet (230 m) away. Facing the car park on the opposite side of the lane, a kissing gate allows wheelchair access to a level asphalt track running past the cromlech down the length of the gorge, passing within about 10 feet (3.0 m) of the cairn. Parc Cwm long cairn is maintained by Cadw (English: to keep), the Welsh Government's historic environment division.

== See also ==
- 4th millennium BC
- 5th millennium BC
- Bioarchaeology
- Britons (historic)
- Cove (standing stones)
- Forensic archaeology
- Knapping
- List of Cadw (Welsh Heritage) Properties
- Palaeopathology
- Passage grave
- Prehistoric archaeology
- Prehistory
- Tumulus
- Welsh placenames
