= List of bays of Wales =

This is a list of the bays of Wales by principal area, taken clockwise around the Welsh coast from the English border at Chepstow to the Dee estuary. It includes coastal indentations which are known by names other than bay (e.g. haven, porth) but which nevertheless have similar characteristics. In addition to those listed, there are numerous bays which remain unnamed on Ordnance Survey (OS) maps, the principal source of names appearing in this list.

By far the largest bay in Wales is Cardigan Bay, occupying the larger part of the west coast. Other major bays are Swansea Bay, Carmarthen Bay, St Brides Bay, Caernarfon Bay and Conwy Bay. The list is divided into principal areas; 16 of the 22 in Wales have a coast though that of Powys is insignificant. Pembrokeshire has been further divided in view of the large number of bays along its intricate coastline, the greater part of which is protected as a national park. Where a bay is shared by more than one principal area, it is listed under both.

== Monmouthshire and Newport ==
Both Monmouthshire and Newport front onto the Severn Estuary. There are no named bays along the low-lying coast of these two principal areas.

== Cardiff ==
- Cardiff Bay is not a bay but rather a body of water enclosed behind Cardiff Bay Barrage since the 1990s.

== Vale of Glamorgan ==
Many of the mainly shallow bays along the coast of the Vale of Glamorgan are backed by cliffs of Jurassic limestone. The Vale of Glamorgan's boundary with Cardiff runs through Cardiff Bay.

- Ranny Bay
- St Mary's Well Bay
- Ball Bay
- Swanbridge Bay
- Sully Bay
- Jackson's Bay
- Whitmore Bay
- Barry Harbour
- Watch House Bay
- Dams Bay
- Ffontygarri Bay
- Limpert Bay
- Penry Bay
- Summerhouse Bay
- Stout Bay
- Tresilian Bay
- St Donat's Bay
- Dunraven Bay

== Bridgend ==
The coast of Bridgend is low lying with plentiful sand. The largest bay, east of Porthcawl is unnamed on OS maps.

- Trecco Bay
- Sandy Bay
- Rest Bay

== Neath Port Talbot ==
The coast of Neath Port Talbot is low-lying and relatively straight save for estuaries and a harbour complex.

- Baglan Bay where the River Neath enters the larger Swansea Bay
- Swansea Bay (part)

== Swansea ==
The coast of Swansea includes half of Swansea Bay, half of the Loughor estuary and the entirety of the Gower Peninsula.

- Swansea Bay (part)
- Bracelet Bay
- Limeslade Bay
- Langland Bay
- Caswell Bay
- Brandy Cove
- Pwlldu Bay
- Bantam Bay
- Three Cliffs Bay
- Oxwich Bay
- Port-Eynon Bay
- Overton Mere
- Mewslade Bay
- Fall Bay
- Rhossili Bay
- Broughton Bay

== Carmarthenshire ==
The Carmarthenshire coast includes a handful of large estuaries and a couple of large dune systems.

- Carmarthen Bay (part)

== Pembrokeshire ==
The scenic cliff-backed bays and headlands of Pembrokeshire are a key part of the area's designation as a national park.

=== South Pembrokeshire ===
From the Carmarthenshire border, west to the mouth of Milford Haven.

- Carmarthen Bay (part)
- Saundersfoot Bay
- Brownslade Bay
- Waterwynch Bay
- Lydstep Haven
- Skrinkle Haven
- Manorbier Bay
- Swanlake Bay
- Freshwater East
- Barafundle Bay
- Broad Haven
- Bullslaughter Bay
- Flimston Bay
- Pen-y-holt Bay
- Hobbyhorse Bay
- Wind Bay
- Blucks Pool
- Freshwater West
- Gravel Bay
- East Pickard Bay
- West Pickard Bay
- Parsonsquarry Bay
- Whitedole Bay
- Castles Bay

=== Caldey Island ===
Caldey Island is an offshore part of Pembrokeshire.

- Priory Bay
- Sandy Bay
- Red Berry Bay
- Sandtop Bay

=== Milford Haven section ===
The Milford Haven Waterway include numerous sheltered creeks and bays.

- West Angle Bay
- Angle Bay
- Bullwell Bay
- Mill Bay
- Scotch Bay
- Gelliswick Bay
- Sandy Haven
- Sleeping Bay
- Butts Bay
- Longoar Bay
- Lindsway Bay
- Watch House Bay
- Monk Haven
- (Dale Roads)
- Castlebeach Bay
- Watwick Bay

=== Southwest Pembrokeshire ===
From Milford Haven to St Brides Bay.

- Mill Bay
- Frenchman's Bay
- Welshman's Bay
- Westdale Bay
- Watery Bay
- Victoria Bay
- Little Castle Bay
- Deadman's Bay
- Mouse's Haven

=== Skokholm ===
Skokholm is an offshore part of Pembrokeshire.

- North Haven
- East Bay
- Peter's Bay
- Hog Bay
- Crab Bay
- Mad Bay
- Little Bay

=== Skomer ===
Skomer is an offshore part of Pembrokeshire.

- North Haven
- South Haven
- Pigstone Bay

=== St Brides Bay ===
St Brides Bay is a deep indentation in Pembrokeshire's west coast which contains numerous smaller bays.

- Martin's Haven
- St Bride's Haven
- Warey Haven
- Mill Haven
- Brandy Bay
- Musselwick
- Rook's Bay
- Little Haven
- The Settlands
- Broad Haven
- Druidston Haven
- North Haven
- Madoc's Haven
- Nolton Haven
- Davy Williams' Haven
- St Brides Bay
- Cwm Bach
- Porthmynawyd
- Numerous smaller inlets including: Aber Dwyrain, Aber-west, Porth y Bwch, Porth Gwyn, Gwadn, Loch warren, Aber Llong, Porth y Rhaw - all near Solfach.
- Caer Bwdy Bay
- Caerfai Bay
- St Non's Bay
- Numerous smaller inlets including: Porth Coch Mawr, Porth y Ffynnon, Porth Clais - all near St Davids.
- Porthlysgi Bay
- Porth Henllys
- Porthtaflod

=== North Pembrokeshire ===
From St Brides Bay to the border with Ceredigion. The north coast forms a part of the southern shore of the larger Cardigan Bay.

- Numerous smaller inlets including: Porthstinian, Porth Brag, Porthyn Hyfryd, Porth Cadnaw, Porthselau - all west of St Davids.
- Whitesands Bay / Porth Mawr
- Numerous smaller inlets including: Porth Lleuog, Porthmelgan, Porth llong, Porth Uwch, Gesail-fawr, Porth Coch, Porth-gwyn, Porth y Dwfr, Porth y Rhaw, Porth Tr-wen, Aberdinas, Aber-pwll - all N of St Davids.
- Abereiddi Bay
- Numerous smaller inlets including: Porth Egr, Porth Dwfn, Porth Ffynnon, Porth-gain, Gribinau, Pwll Crochan, Aber-draw, Pwll Olfa, Pwll llong, Pwll Whiting, Aber Castle, Aber yw, Pwllstrodur, Aber Mochyn, Porth Glastwr, Aber mawr, Aber Bach, Porth Dwgan, Porth Coch, Pwll March, Pwll Long, Pwllcrochan, Pwlldawnau, Aber Cerrig-gwynion, Pwll Deri, Porth Maenmelyn, Pwll Arian, Pwll ffyliaid
- Carreg Onnen Bay
- Numerous smaller inlets including: Pwll Bach, Pwlluog, Porthsychan, Aber felin, Pant y Bara, Pany y Dwr, Porth Maen,
- Anglas Bay
- Pwll Hir
- Fishguard Bay (including Pwll Landdu, Aber Richard, Pwll y Blewyn, Aber Grugog)
- Numerous smaller inlets including: Aber Bach, Pwll Gwylog, Pwll cwn, Pwllgwaelod, Aber Careg-y-Fran, Aber Pensidan, Aber Pen-clawdd, Pwll Glas,
- Newport Bay (including Aber Pig-y-baw, Aber Ysgol, Aber Step)
- Pwll Coch
- Traeth Bach
- Ceibwr Bay
- Pwllygranant
- Pwll y Mwn
- Pwll Edrych
- Pwll Melyn

=== Ramsey Island ===
Ramsey Island is an offshore part of north Pembrokeshire. It includes clockwise from the south the following indentations: Porth Lleuog, Pwll Bendro, Aber Mawr, Bay Ogof Hen, Rhod Uchaf, Rhod Isaf, Aberfelin, Yr Hen-ffordd, Abermyharan

== Ceredigion ==
The Ceredigion coast is a gentle curve forming part of the shore of the larger Cardigan Bay but includes a handful of named indentations.

- Cribach Bay
- Aberporth Bay
- New Quay Bay
- Little Quay Bay
- Clarach Bay

== Powys ==
The Powys 'coast' is a short stretch of tidal estuary of the River Dovey devoid of bays.

== Gwynedd ==
The coast of Gwynedd includes several bays which are indentations of the larger Cardigan Bay. There are a large number of small bays on the coast of the Llŷn Peninsula.

- Barmouth Bay
- Porth Fechan
- Borth Fawr
- Porth Ceiriad
- Porth Neigwl / Hell's Mouth
- Numerous smaller inlets including: Porth Llawenan, Porth Alwm, Porth Ysgo, Porth Cadlan
- Aberdaron Bay (including Porth simdde, Porth Meudwy)
- Numerous smaller inlets including: Porth Cloch, Porth y Pistyll, Hen Borth, Parwyd, Porth Felen
- Porth Llanllawen
- Numerous smaller inlets including: Porthorion, Porth Oer, Porth y Wrach, Porthllwynog, Porth Iago, Dyllborth, Porth Ferin, Porth Widlin, Porth Ty-mawr, Porth Wen Bach, Porth Colmon, Porth Ychain, Porth Gwylan, Porth Ysgaden, Porth Llydan, Porth Ysglaig, Porth Towyn, Aber Geirch, Borth Wen
- Porth Dinllaen
- Porth Nefyn
- Porth Bodeilias
- Porth Pistyll
- Porth Howel
- Porth y Nant
- Caernarfon Bay
- Foryd Bay / Y Foryd

=== Bardsey (Ynys Enlli) ===
- Bardsey is an offshore part of Gwynedd. Numerous small indentations including: Bae'r nant, Bae y Rhigol, Porth Solfach, Porth Hadog, Henllwyn

== Anglesey ==
Anglesey is Wales' largest island. Its coast is heavily indented. Clockwise around its coast from Abermenai Point at its southern tip are:

- Llanddwyn Bay
- Malltraeth Bay
- Numerous smaller inlets including: Porth y Gro, Porth Twyn-mawr, Porth y Cwch, Porth Cae-Ceffylau, Porth Cadwaladr
- Aberffraw Bay (including Porth Lleidiog, Porth Terfyn)
- Numerous smaller inlets including: Porth Aels, Porth Wen, Porth Cwyfan, Porth China, Pwll Burn, Caethle, Porth Terfyn, Porth Trecastell, Porth Nobla, Porth Sur, Porth y Tywod,
- Cymyran Bay (including Silver Bay, Porth yr Ych (both Holy Island))
- Numerous smaller inlets including: Porth Gorslwyn, Porth Cae-du, Borthwen, Porth y Corwgl, Porth yr Hwngan, Porth Gwlach, Porth Saint, Porth y Garan, Porth Castell, Porth Diana,
- Treaddur Bay
- Numerous smaller inlets including: Porth yr Afon, Porth y Pwll, Porth-y-post, Porth y Corwgl, Porth Dafarch, Porth Ruffydd, Porth y Gwin,
- Abraham's Bosom (including Porth y Gwyddel)
- Gogarth Bay
- Porth Namarch
- Beddmanarch Bay
- Porth Penrhyn-mawr
- Numerous smaller inlets including: Porth Dryw, Porth Delysg, Porth Tywyn-mawr, Porth Defaid, Porth Trefadog, Porth y Ffynnon, Porth Fudr, Porth Trwyn, Porth Crugmor or Cable Bay, Porth Tyddyn-uchaf, Porth y Santes, Porth Swtan or Church Bay, Porth y Dwfr, Porth y Bribys, Porth y Nant, Porth yr Hwch, Porth yr Hwch-fach, Port(h) Ffau'r-llwynog, Porth y Dyfn, Porth yr Eboil, Porth Newydd, Porth tywodog, Hen Borth
- Cemlyn Bay
- Numerous smaller inlets including: Porth-y-pistyll, Porth y Gwartheg, Porth y Galen-ddu, Porth Wnal,
- Cemaes Bay (including Porth yr Ogof, Porth Wyllfa, Porth Padrig)
- Porth Llanlleiana
- Hell's Mouth / Porth Cynfor
- Porth Adfan
- Porth Wen
- Bull Bay / Porth Llechog (including Pwll y Tarw, Pwll y Merched)
- Numerous smaller inlets including: Porth Offeiriad, Aber Cawell, Porth Newydd, Porthyrychen, Porth Eilian, Porth y Corwgl
- Fresh Water Bay
- Numerous smaller inlets including: Porthygwichiaid, Porth Helygen, Porth yr Aber, Porth Garreg-fawr
- Dulas Bay
- Porth y Mor
- Lligwy Bay
- Numerous smaller inlets including: Porth Forllwyd, Porth Helaeth, Porth yr Ynys, Porth Lydan, Porth Nigwyl, Porth Moelfre
- Porth y Rhos
- Borth-wen
- Red Wharf Bay / Traeth-coch (including Porth-llongdy-uchaf)
- Porth Penmon

== Conwy ==
The coast of Conwy extends some way to east and west of the Conwy estuary.

- Conwy Bay
- Ormes Bay / Llandudno Bay
- Porth Dyniewaid
- Penrhyn Bay
- Rhos Bay / Colwyn Bay
- (Kinmel Bay)
- Liverpool Bay (part)

== Denbighshire and Flintshire ==
There are no bays indenting the coast of either Denbighshire or Flintshire in northeast Wales though both front onto the much larger Liverpool Bay.
