= Mumbles Battery =

Building in Wales

- Mumbles Head; Swansea; Wales
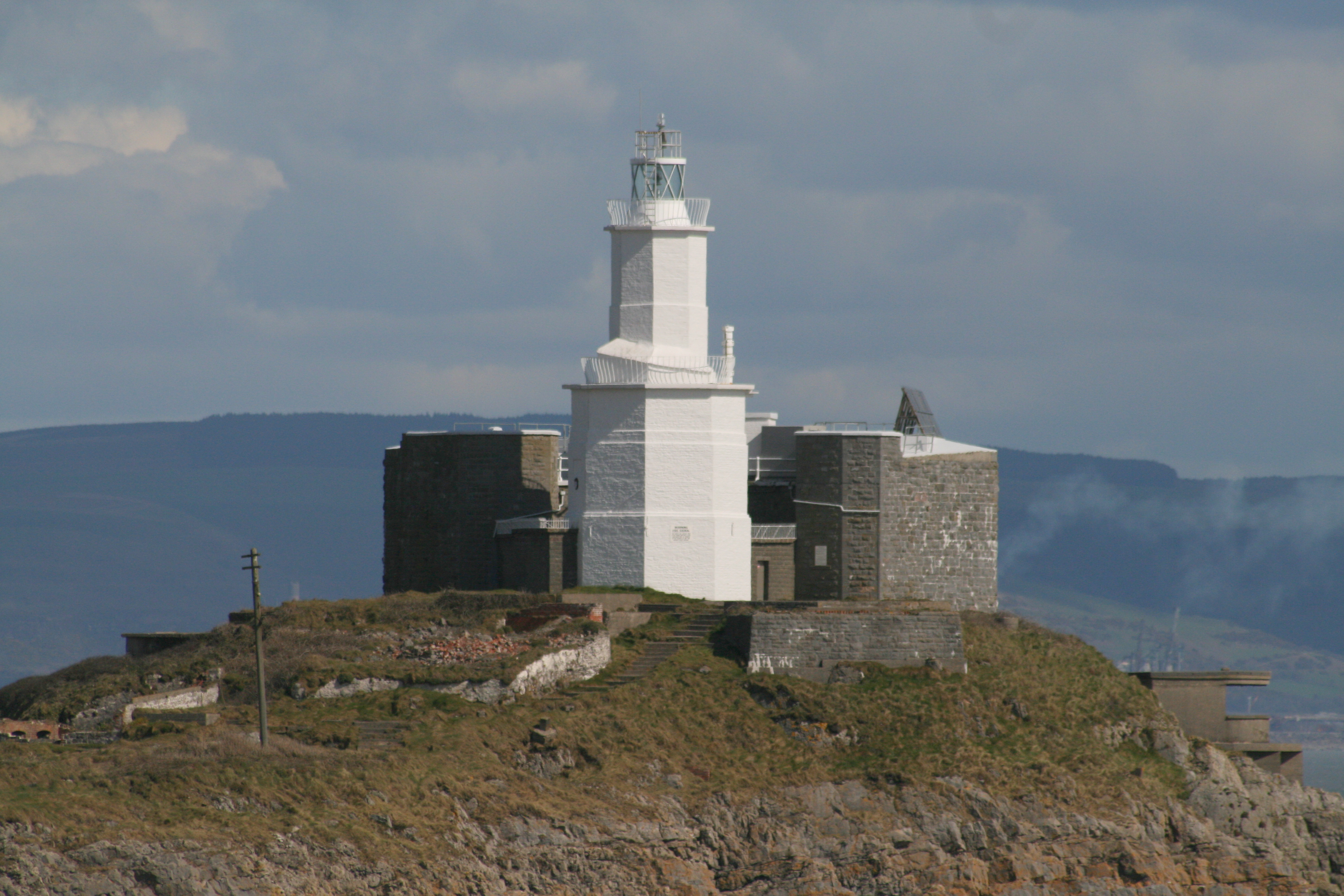
- Mumbles Battery at the base of the Mumbles Lighthouse, 2008

Site information
- Open to the public: No

Location
- Coordinates: 51.566853°N 3.971235°W

Site history
- Built: 1859–61
- In use: Trinity House lighthouse
- Materials: Stone

Mumbles Battery is a coastal battery situated on the north coast of the Bristol Channel, overlooking Swansea. It was built around the base of the Mumbles Lighthouse as part of a network of Palmerston Forts which was established in response to fears of French invasion, and was designed to protect Swansea Bay.

History and Construction

Construction of the battery began in 1859 and was completed by 1861 at a cost of £8,760.

During the Second World War the defences of the Bristol Channel were increased significantly. In 1940 the two 4.7-inch guns were operated by soldiers from the 531st (Glamorgan) Coast Regiment, Royal Artillery. Well before the end of the war, as the German threat decreased, the battery was placed into care and maintenance.

The battery was declared surplus to requirements in 1956 upon the dissolution of the UK's coast artillery. The guns were dismounted and the battery disposed of.

== Publications ==
- Saunders, A.; Spurgeon, C.J.; Thomas, H.J.; Roberts, D.J. (2001). Guns Across The Severn: The Victorian Fortifications of Glamorgan. Aberystwyth: Royal Commission on the Ancient and Historical Monuments of Wales. ISBN 1-871184-25-8.
