= Mumbles Beach =

Beach in Swansea, Wales

Coordinates: 51.57344°N 3.99237°W

Mumbles Beach is a very small sheltered area of sand and rock pools sandwiched between Swansea Bay beach and Bracelet Bay in the south eastern corner of the Gower Peninsula, Swansea, Wales.

A lot of sea life can be found in the pools and under the rocks, left trapped by the retreating tides. During the summer, this beach can get very busy with people combing the beach for hermit crabs and small fishes. The beach is accessible from a flight of steps beside the Mumbles Pier.
