= Horton Bay =

Horton Bay may refer to:

- Horton Bay, Michigan, United States, a census-designated place
- Horton Beach, Wales
