= Blue Pool =

Blue Pool may refer to:

- Blue Pool, Dorset
- Tamolitch Blue Pool, Oregon
- Blue Pool Bay, Wales
- Blue Pool, Bermagui, New South Wales
