= The Wheel of Fortune (novel) =

1984 novel by Susan Howatch

- First edition (UK)
- Author: Susan Howatch
- Language: English
- Genre: Historical fiction
- Publisher: Hamish Hamilton (UK); Simon & Schuster (US)
- Publication date: 1984
- Publication place: United Kingdom
- Media type: Print (Hardcover)
- Pages: 1,100 pp
- ISBN: 0-241-11217-6

The Wheel of Fortune (1984) is a novel by Susan Howatch and recounts the trials and tribulations of a fictitious British family, the Godwins, who appear to be part of the minor aristocracy.

As the title of the novel and Boethius' comments on Fortune as printed on the first page of the very first part suggest, defying the ravages of time and fate forms a central theme to this novel, where the six primary characters seek to challenge fate or to make their own destinies regardless of the social norms or circumstances of the time.

== Synopsis ==
The book's main events all revolve around a stately Georgian era home named Oxmoon, and are set on the Gower Peninsula in Wales, spanning a period of over fifty years in which the owners of Oxmoon all have to face immense challenges, financial hardship and even personal tragedy.

The book is divided into six parts, each one based on the point-of-view of several characters, namely:

- Robert "the Winner" Godwin (Part 1) The eldest of five brothers (the others being John, Lionel, Edmund and Thomas) Robert is a successful lawyer based in London and the heir apparent of a family of Welsh rural gentry which while seemingly happy, successful and prosperous, has a skeleton or two in the closet that as usual involves murder and adultery.

His high-handed attitude and dominating personality makes him aloof from his siblings, with two exceptions being...

- Ginevra "Ginette" (Part 2), Robert's cousin and later Robert's wife. Ginevra is haunted by an even darker secret from her past that threatens her relationship with Robert's family and her marriage to Robert; and ...
- John Godwin (Part 3), Robert's brother, a sensitive soul trapped in spiritual limbo following the death of his first wife, torn between convention and passion.
- Kester (Part 4), Robert and Ginevra's son (and John's nephew), a gifted writer but a terrible financial manager.
- Harry (Part 5), John's son and Kester's cousin, who resents Kester's inheritance of Oxmoon and is engaged in a lifelong feud over the same that ends only with Kester's death.
- Hal (Part 6), Harry's son, who unlike his father is close to Kester. Hal's story is in fact more of a detective story, in which he investigates the circumstances revolving around Kester Godwin's apparent suicide.

=== Part 1: Robert (1913) ===
Upon the death of her husband Conor, Ginevra decides to leave New York City, entrust her young children to her late husband's family from Ireland, and return to Wales to stay with her childhood friend, the lawyer and politician Robert Godwin (who is also heir presumptive to the Godwin family estate, Oxmoon). Robert, who usually prizes logical thinking, willpower and level-headedness, initially expresses annoyance and worry with his feelings for Ginevra (which are mutually reciprocated), but eventually gives in.

As Robert and Ginevra revive their childhood relationship and eventually consummate it, he then decides to marry Ginevra but the marriage is vehemently opposed by his mother Margaret, and Robert soon learns why when he discovers several dark secrets in his family revolving around his father Bobby and his grandmother. Bobby killed his mother's lover, Owen Bryn-Davies, to keep him from defrauding the Godwin family of Oxmoon, and has been psychologically damaged ever since. With Margaret's resigned tolerance and understanding, Bobby engaged in many sexual affairs to relieve himself of the guilt of having murdered Owen and one of the women he slept with was a teenaged Ginevra.

=== Part 2: Ginevra (1913–1919) ===
Notwithstanding the opposition of his family, Robert goes ahead and marries Ginevra, and despite the abrasive differences inherent in their own individual personalities (Ginevra's describes her mind was all "splashes of colour" and Robert as "emotionally colour-blind") as well as the opposition of Ginevra's children with Conor, Robert and Ginevra stay together as husband and wife in London (where Robert has his practice as a lawyer), eventually having two sons of their own together, Robin and Kester.

The First World War breaks out, and with it, the first of several family tragedies befalls the Godwin family. Robert's brothers Lionel and Edmund are sent to France, where Lionel is killed in action and Edmund is left psychologically maimed, leaving Robert broken and despondent. He takes up mountaineering, and goes off by himself periodically, leaving a bored and slightly paranoid Ginevra alone in their rural setting, with uncomfortable relations with her inlaws, including straitlaced and judgmental John. She travels to London frequently, to see girlfriends and drink away her worries. Robert confides to Ginevra that following a friend's death in a mountaineering accident, he is terrified of the prospect of dying, especially more so now that Lionel is dead. Robert eventually decides to retire to Oxmoon with Ginevra, but even then that is not the end of their tribulations.

Robert suddenly contracts an unnamed degenerative neurological disorder (described later in Part 6 as multiple sclerosis) that first manifests itself as unexplained tremors, later intensifying into full-blown paralysis over the next nine years. By the end of Ginevra's story, Robert requires the use of a wheelchair and realises his condition will only get worse. Feeling she might be happier married to someone else, Robert offers his wife a divorce but Ginevra declines, vowing to stay on by Robert's side till the bitter end, saying "I could always walk out on a husband. But I could never turn my back on a friend."

=== Part 3: John (1921–1928) ===
Back in Oxmoon, John Godwin, one of Robert's surviving brothers, begins planning to take over as the heir of Oxmoon as Robert's disease begins to take hold, but more deaths soon take place. Bobby's wife, Margaret, suddenly dies following a party, upsetting the balance of the family and unhinging Bobby, who then takes on a mistress, Milly Straker, who turns out to be a gold digger intent on seizing Oxmoon from the Godwins. As Bobby lapses into senility and falls under Straker's control, John, Robert, and their younger brother Thomas vie with her for control of Oxmoon. Due to Bobby's mismanagement a workers' strike breaks out, forcing Straker out of Oxmoon, leaving the mansion and the lands back in the hands of the Godwins.

John is also personally affected when his young wife Blanche passes away from a congenital cardiac defect, and his nephew Robin falls to his death through a window. In the immediate aftermath of this, John caves in to his "inappropriate" feelings for Bronwen, the sister-in-law of his farm manager. He later resumes his business life in London with his brother Edmund and falls under the spell of a powerful American millionaire, Armstrong. He's given a choice, marry Constance Armstrong, his American employer's daughter and advance his family's commercial and social standing, or follow his heart and spend the rest of his life with the working-class Welshwoman Bronwen, who is, he feels, the only person who knows his true self. John marries Constance but finds his marriage emotionally unsatisfying, so after finding out he has fathered a child with Bronwen, he leaves Constance, choosing love and ostracism over profit and respectability. He struggles socially while making his living through market farming with Thomas' help. The supportive Bronwen convinces John do the right thing: relinquish his personal claim to Oxmoon, and to help aid his nephew Kester to succeed Bobby as master of Oxmoon, now that both Robert and Bobby are dying.

=== Part 4: Kester (1928–1939) ===
Home-schooled by Ginevra and living a somewhat sheltered life in a house with a dying father and a sainted deceased older brother, Kester Godwin survives an awkward adolescence to become an author. His recollections reveal that he has inherited his mother's emotional intensity, her propensity for melodrama and sensual excess, as well as Robert's competitive spirit and obsessive nature, leaving Kester with a manipulative streak that becomes more apparent in Harry and Hal's stories.

Upon his father's death, Kester's Uncle John, whose brave romantic decision made him a hero in Ginevra's eyes, makes good his promise to the now deceased Robert and attempts to help Kester prepare for his role as the master of Oxmoon. Once Ginevra dies, Kester comes into his inheritance, but is an incurable romantic who prefers writing over farming, choosing to invest money in indulging his taste for art and sculpture rather than properly running the estate, much to the disgust of his uncle Thomas, and evoking the envy of his cousin Harry, John's son . Harry's jealousy stems from the fact Harry felt that his father should have inherited Oxmoon instead of Ginevra and Kester.

Kester's relationship with Thomas becomes more heated and violent when he marries Anna, a German Jew on the run from Hitler's Nazi regime. With the Oxmoon estate in arrears thanks to Kester's mismanagement, John and Thomas are forced to seize control of Oxmoon's management from Kester and Anna. Naturally, Kester vows vengeance to retake back Oxmoon, and on Thomas for having publicly humiliated him and insulted his wife.

=== Part 5: Harry (1939–1952) ===
Harry is seen as the perfect boy - handsome, clever and tough - but we learn he is a lost soul, wanting to follow music and desperate for his father's approval. After Bronwen leaves her beloved John to go to Canada to escape their socially-derided relationship, John resumes his London life with Constance and Harry silently melts down at boarding school. John's absence from Wales gives young master of the castle Kester more room to live an idyllic life at Oxmoon, which infuriates Harry. He finds some solace in a local, distant relative, with whom he has nothing in common but sexual attraction. They later marry and have four mostly accidental children who cause Harry more trouble than joy. Desperately unhappy, he volunteers for military service in World War II to get away from his pain. A moment of pure joy awaits Harry upon his return — since his stepmother Constance died two years ago, his father rekindled his relationship with Bronwen, the woman Harry considers his mother and his guide towards the good. He arrives at the estate to find her there waiting, and after a tearful reunion, he sees John and Bronwen finally marry.

The conflict between the two cousins still remains however, and grows with the eerily coinciding deaths of the young wives of both men. Harry's hatred of Kester only increases when it's revealed that he is estranged from his own young sons (who blame him for their mother's death from complications in childbirth) even as Kester ingratiates himself with one of them, Hal. Yet when Kester kills Thomas (in apparent self-defence), Harry chooses to help cover up the killing and make it look like he died in a car crash, but the struggle is far from over. Kester fears Harry exposing his killing of Thomas, while Harry in turn is afraid Kester will deprive him of Oxmoon and frame him for his uncle's death. Harry's story ends with a cliffhanger, following Kester's invitation to Harry to discuss and resolve their differences in an isolated area near a dangerous stretch of cliffs by the seashore.

=== Part 6: Hal (1966) ===
By 1966, Oxmoon is barely a shadow of its prewar self and in a state of disrepair due to the lack of funds available for renovation. In Hal Godwin's account, it is revealed that his uncle Kester was found drowned fourteen years before, and so Hal's story is reminiscent of a crime fiction tale as he seeks to prove that his uncle's death was neither due to suicide nor accident. Hal eventually discovers that his father murdered Kester, but along with this terrible revelation, Hal finds an unlikely means of saving Oxmoon thanks to Kester's literary genius.

The novel ends with Oxmoon being restored and reopened as a tourist attraction under the auspices of the National Trust. Shortly after the inauguration ceremony, the Godwin family enjoys one last dance in Oxmoon's now restored ballroom before closing for the night.

== Author's note ==
Howatch acknowledges that this novel is in fact a re-creation in a modern form of the story of the Plantagenet family of Edward III, the modern characters being created from those of his eldest son Edward of Woodstock (The Black Prince) and his wife Joan of Kent, John of Gaunt and his mistress, later wife, Katherine Swynford, Richard II (son of Edward of Woodstock), Henry IV (son of John of Gaunt) and Henry IV's eldest son King Henry V.
