= Langland Bay =

Bay and resort in Gower, Swansea, Wales

Coordinates: 51°34′N 4°0′W

Langland Bay is a popular coastal holiday resort in Gower, Swansea in south Wales. It is a popular surfing beach which regularly meets the European Blue Flag award for quality.

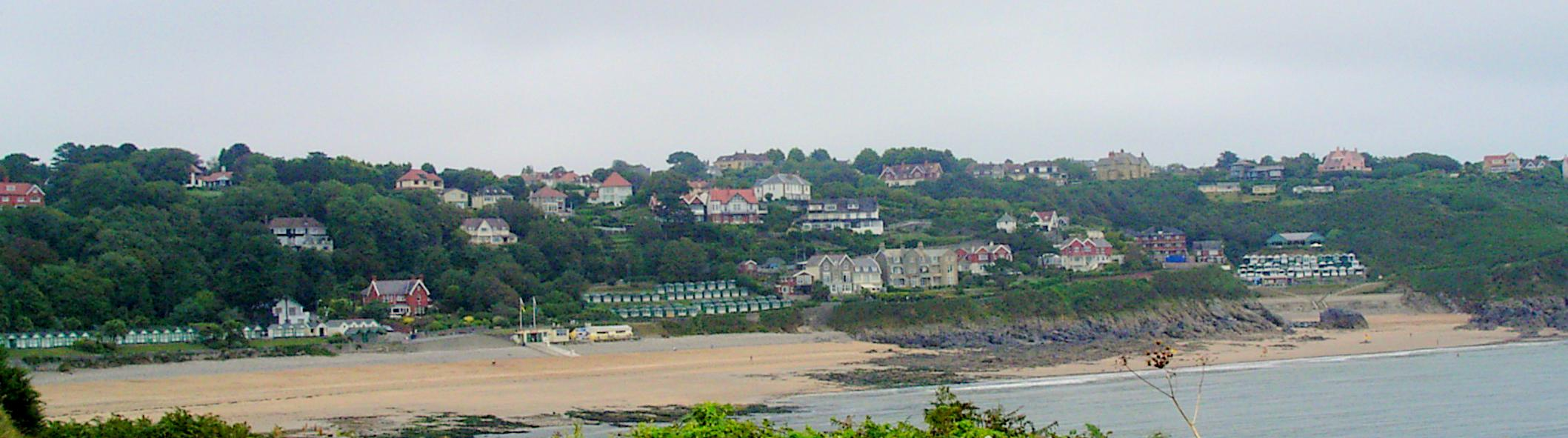
Langland and Rotherslade Bays

== History ==
Langland Bay - together with Caswell Bay, Rotherslade, Limeslade Bay, Bracelet Bay and Port Eynon - is managed by the City and County of Swansea council. Because of their relative proximity to Swansea and the South Wales Valleys, Langland Bay and Caswell Bay in particular were extremely popular in the 1950s and 60s with holiday visitors, who would arrive by coach or by public transport. In summer months the sea front serviced by the South Wales Transport bus route 87; at other times of the year, a walk was necessary from Langland Corner, at the top of Langland Bay Road.

The sea front of Langland and the adjacent Rotherslade, or 'Little Langland' as it is sometimes known, were once the location for three hotels: the Langland Bay, the Ael-y-Don, and the Osborne; and three further hotels - the Brynfield Hotel, the Langland Court, and the Wittemberg - were located in the immediate hinterland. All bar one have closed over the past forty years, and have been replaced with apartments (Langland Bay, Osborne and Ael-y-don), converted to a nursing home (Brynfield), closed and subjected to arson attacks (Langland Court and, previously, the Osborne). The Wittemberg was partially demolished and re-opened in its original Victorian core as the Little Langland Hotel.

By far the most dominant building, built in the mid-nineteenth century and backing on to the Newton Cliffs, was originally known as Llan-y-Llan. Built in the Scottish Baronial style by the Crawshay family, the Merthyr Tydfil Ironmasters, it was used as their summer residence. In the first part of the 20th century it later became part of the Langland Bay Hotel, and later again the Club Union Convalescent Home for coal miners. After a period of closure it has been renamed Langland Bay Manor and been converted into 13 luxury apartments.

In 1897 the French Impressionist painter Alfred Sisley made two watercolours of Langland Bay, while on honeymoon. He was staying at the Osborne Hotel, which overlooked both Langland Bay and Rotherslade Bay. Over twenty paintings resulted from his visit to Penarth and the Gower. Two of them are now in the National Museum of Wales in Cardiff.

As well as the beach huts that still exist, Langland Bay was famous for its 'community' of green canvas beach tents. These were erected annually, usually between April and early September, on the stoney storm beach in front of the promenade. A local spectacle was the early September 'spring tide watch' when rough seas would occasionally cause the loss of one or two. Somewhat safer and more sheltered on the higher ground of the Langland Bay Golf Club, a further two rows of tents were permitted. All succumbed to vandalism in the 1970s.

Langland Bay has always been the site of sports innovation. Every year in the early 1960s saw local teenagers becoming amongst the first in the country to take up American innovations such as skateboarding, surfing, and fibreglass canoes; which overtook their parents` use of canvas sea-going canoes.

== Access and facilities ==
A coastal path links Langland Bay to Caswell Bay to the west and to Rotherslade, Limeslade Bay and Bracelet Bay to the east. The bay is accessible by road, and is serviced by public transport for a short period during the school summer holidays; there are also two large Pay-&-Display car-parks. Hot and cold snacks are available from two small shops, though these tend to operate limited opening times during the winter and focus on ice-creams and gifts for children. Public showers are available near the beach, and a St John's Ambulance Hut and Information Office operate at peak times.

Swansea City Council operate a Surf Lifeguard service at the beach from the end of May to the beginning of September.

The beach currently hosts around 80 Council-owned holiday beach huts which are rented out for variable periods. The oldest of these were originally built in 1923, but a group of 12 at the western end of the Bay were built in the early 1960s. Over the years most had been gradually falling into a sorry state of repair, with at least one lost to an arson attack, but in 2007 reconstruction of them all was begun. At the eastern end of the Bay are a number of privately owned beach huts within their own grounds and gated car park.

Also at the western end of the beach promenade is a brasserie, which opened in the summer of 2007. This replaced an old tea shop and ice-cream parlour of a similar age to the original beach huts.

== Sports ==
=== Tennis ===
Six tennis courts can be hired by the public. These have been the location in recent years for the popular Swansea Junior Tennis Championships supported by Swansea City Council. (In the 1960s the courts hosted a similar tournament but covered a wider age range.)

=== Golf ===
The course of Langland Bay Golf Club A Beautiful Welsh Golf Course with stunning views of the Gower Peninsula – Welsh Golf Club overlooks the bay from the west, and has great views of Langland Bay and Caswell Bay. The 18-hole course is relatively short, with a standard scratch score of 70. However, the tightness of the course is enough to challenge any golfer, and unpredictable winds from the exposed headland can often affect the game.

=== Surfing ===
Langland Bay is popular with surfers, as it is conveniently located near residential areas and because of the variety of waves that can be ridden at different tide levels.

At low tide, Crab Island provides one of the best-shaped and most powerful right-hand waves in the country; however, many are put off by the fact that the wave breaks onto the exposed reef, so it is considered dangerous for novice surfers. The sandbar situated offshore between Langland Point and Crab Island is actually a reef, which creates a powerful and dangerous wave breaking in shallow water. Langland Point offers a more gentle wave on days when the swell is large.

At mid-tide the reef (which is more secluded from the main swell) provides a smaller but crowded wave.

At very high tide the shore-break deposits unwary surfers directly onto stones.

Several local surfers have competed on an international level, most notably Carwyn Williams, whose parents ran a small hotel in the resort. Carwyn Williams once beat Australian Damien Hardman, the World champion at the time, in Hossegor, France. Shortly after this he endured a horrific car crash, doctors telling him he would not walk again. He is now living and surfing in France after making a full recovery.

=== Fishing ===
Fishing is not commonly practised in Langland these days, either from the beach or from the rocky shore. A strikingly marked large rock on the western side of the bay called Cross Rock used to be a popular spot to fish at high tide in the summer months with float and soft crab as bait. Catches included bass, sea bream and dogfish. Langland Point held similar promise, but the use of spinners or feathers here sometimes delivered mackerel as well as bass. Occasional Common dab and European plaice were caught with lugworm or ragworm from the beach, although the worm population of the beach has always been small.
