= Susan Howatch =

British author (born 1940)

- Born: Susan Elizabeth Sturt; 14 July 1940 (age 86); Leatherhead, Surrey, United Kingdom
- Education: Sutton High School; King's College London
- Occupation: Author
- Spouse: Joseph Howatch (m. 1964, 1975) (separated)
- Writing career
- Language: English
- Years active: 1965–
- Genre: Historical fiction
- Notable work: The Wheel of Fortune

Susan Howatch (born 14 July 1940) is a British author. Her writing career has been distinguished by family saga-type novels that describe the lives of related characters for long periods of time. Her later books have also become known for their religious and philosophical themes.

== Early life ==
Susan Howatch was born on 14 July 1940, in Leatherhead, Surrey, England; as Susan Elizabeth Sturt. Her father was a stockbroker. As a child, she was educated at Sutton High School. Even though she was an only child and her father had died during the Second World War, she has often described her childhood to be a happy and satisfied one. After completing her school studies, she entered King's College in London and obtained her degree in law in 1961.

In 1964, she emigrated to the United States, where she worked as a secretary in New York City. She married Joseph Howatch (4 December 1935 – 25 April 2011), a sculptor and writer, that year and began her career as a writer, finding success almost immediately with her intricately detailed gothic novels.

The couple had a daughter in 1971. Upon separating from her husband in 1975, Howatch returned to the UK, then moved to the Republic of Ireland in 1976 before returning to the UK permanently in 1980.

After her latter return to England, Howatch found herself "rich, successful, and living exactly where I wanted to live," but feeling a spiritual emptiness that she ascribed to "trying to hold my divided self together" and questioning her life and what she should do with it.

She had settled in Salisbury out of love for the beauty of the city, but found herself increasingly drawn to Salisbury Cathedral; eventually she began to study Anglican Christianity in earnest. Quotations from contemporary Anglican writers, such as Glyn Simon, Bishop of Llandaff (1958–1970), often appear in her books as chapter headings. She experienced a spiritual epiphany, and concluded that she should continue to write novels, but to "set forth my discoveries in the light of faith, no matter how feeble and inadequate my beginner's faith was." This personal turning point culminated in Howatch's most successful and popular works, the Starbridge series.

== Earlier novels and sagas ==
Her first novel was The Dark Shore (1965). She published several other "gothic" novels before she turned to the first of her family sagas, Penmarric (1971), which details the fortunes and disputes of the Penmar family in Cornwall during the nineteenth and twentieth centuries. An important theme of the story is how the mansion of Penmarric becomes controlled by various branches of the family. The family fortune was made in the Cornish tin mining industry, which is discussed throughout each one of the six parts, each with a different character as narrator. As is made clear by the chapter headings, the fortunes of the family closely parallel the Plantagenet family, including Henry II of England and Eleanor of Aquitaine, with the mansion representing the throne. It was adapted into a television series with the same name in 1979.

Howatch wrote the novel at her kitchen table in New Jersey. Publisher Michael Korda said: "It is a frequently stated basic belief of book publishing that somewhere in the country at any given moment some unknown woman is writing a major best-seller (usually referred to as 'the next Gone with the Wind') at her kitchen table while looking after her baby, but this was the first time I had experienced the phenomenon in real life. Susan Howatch had written her massive novel with one hand on the cradle and the other doing the typing, but, like most authors who succeed, she had never doubted that her book would be a bestseller." Korda asserted that, while reading the drafts, he noticed similarities to the Plantagenets and asked Howatch if that was the case. She replied that Shakespeare had borrowed most of his plots from other sources, and asked Korda if he thought anyone would notice.

Howatch followed a similar theme in her vast saga The Wheel of Fortune, where the story of the Godwin family of Oxmoon in Gower, South Wales, is in fact a re-creation in a modern form of the story of the Plantagenet family of Edward III of England, the modern characters being created from those of his eldest son Edward of Woodstock (The Black Prince) and his wife Joan of Kent, John of Gaunt and his mistress, later wife, Katherine Swynford, Richard II (son of Edward of Woodstock), Henry IV (son of John of Gaunt) and Henry IV's eldest son King Henry V. Again the mansion represents the throne.

She also wrote three other family sagas, Cashelmara, which focuses on the family of Edward I (Edward de Salis), his son, Edward II (Patrick de Salis) and others; and The Rich Are Different followed by its sequel, The Sins of the Fathers, both of which combine to tell the story, in America' s financial industry, of Julius Caesar, Cleopatra, Mark Antony, and Octavian.

== Starbridge series ==
This series of six books sets out to describe the history of the Church of England through the twentieth century. Each of the six books is self-contained, and each is narrated by a different character. However, the main protagonist of each book also appears in the other books, allowing the author to present the same incidents from different viewpoints.

The action of all six books centres around the fictional Anglican diocese of Starbridge, which is supposedly in the west of England, and also features the Fordite monks, a fictional Anglican monastic order. The cathedral and ecclesiastical hierarchy at Starbridge are based on the real-life Salisbury.

The first three books of the series (Glittering Images, Glamorous Powers, Ultimate Prizes) begin in the 1930s and continue through World War II. The second three (Scandalous Risks, Mystical Paths, Absolute Truths) take place in the 1960s.

Glittering Images is narrated by the Reverend Dr Charles Ashworth, a Cambridge academic who undergoes something of a spiritual and nervous breakdown after being sent by the Archbishop of Canterbury to secretly investigate possible sexual transgressions in the household of the Bishop of Starbridge. Ashworth is helped to recover and to realize the source of his problems by Father Jonathan Darrow, the widowed abbot of Grantchester Abbey of the Fordite monks.

Glamorous Powers follows the story of Jonathan Darrow himself as he leaves the Fordite order at age sixty following a powerful vision. He then must deal with the problems of his adult children, address the question of a new intimate relationship, and search for a new ministry. His particular crisis surrounds the use and misuse of his charismatic powers of healing, and his unsettling mystical visions, or "showings".

Ultimate Prizes takes place during World War II. It is narrated by Neville Aysgarth, a young and ambitious Archdeacon of Starbridge from a lower-middle-class background in the north of England. After being widowed and marrying again, he too undergoes something of a breakdown but is rescued by Jonathan Darrow.

Scandalous Risks follows Aysgarth to a canonry of Westminster Abbey and back to Starbridge, where he becomes dean of the cathedral and Ashworth becomes a bishop. It is narrated by Venetia Flaxton, a young aristocrat who risks great scandal by beginning a relationship with the married Aysgarth, her father's best friend. The relationships, and Aysgarth's family, closely echo the relationship of H. H. Asquith and Venetia Stanley.

Mystical Paths follows Nicholas Darrow, son of Jonathan, as he narrowly avoids going off the rails prior to his ordination while investigating the mysterious disappearance of Christian Aysgarth, eldest son of Dean Aysgarth.

Absolute Truths comes full circle and is narrated by a much older but still troubled Charles Ashworth, thirty-one years after he was originally encountered in the first of the books.

== St Benet's trilogy ==
The St Benet's trilogy takes place in the London of the 1980s and 1990s. Again, it illustrates the changes in the Anglican Church in those years and brings back many of the characters in the Starbridge series. However, while the church is still at the heart of the books, there is an increased emphasis on characters who are not members of the clergy. Like the six preceding books, each in the trilogy is written in the first person by a different narrator.

A Question of Integrity (given the title The Wonder Worker in the United States), picks up the story of Nicholas Darrow twenty years after the last of the Starbridge novels. Nick is now rector of a church in the City of London, where he runs a centre for the ministry of healing. His own life is greatly affected by events taking place at the centre, especially after he meets Alice Fletcher, an insecure new worker there, and is forced to reassess his beliefs and commitments as a result.

The High Flyer narrates the story of a City lawyer, Carter Graham, who "has it all". Her outwardly successful life, complete with highly compensated career and suitable marriage, undergoes profound changes after harrowing events smacking of the occult begin to occur, which reveal that things are not what they seem.

The Heartbreaker follows the life of Gavin Blake, a charismatic prostitute specializing in powerful, influential male clients, who finds himself at the centre of a criminal empire and must fight to save his life. Meanwhile, both Graham and Darrow must deal with their own weaknesses in trying to help Gavin.

== Later life ==
According to her publisher Michael Korda, Howatch was never comfortable with publishing popular fiction, and felt that it didn't satisfy her intellectual and moral needs. He cites this as a reason for her shift away from popular fiction to more serious writing. For Korda, she became the only best-selling novelist to walk away from her own success or to leave her publisher because "he had sold too many copies of her books."

Howatch has used some of the profits from her novels to found an academic post with the title "Starbridge Lecturer in Natural Science and Theology" in the Faculty of Divinity at Cambridge University, devoted to linking the fields of science and religion. The first holder of this post was the Reverend Dr. Fraser Watts, a psychologist and theologian. Dr. Watts was succeeded in 2014 by the Revd Dr. Andrew Davison, who previously taught at Westcott House, Cambridge.

Howatch is an Honorary Fellow of King's College, London, the University of Wales at Lampeter, and Sarum College in Salisbury. In 2012, Howatch was awarded an honorary Doctor of Letters degree from Hope College. She currently resides in Leatherhead.

== Bibliography ==
- The Dark Shore (1965)
- The Waiting Sands (1966)
- April's Grave (1967)
- Call in the Night (1967)
- The Shrouded Walls (1968)
- The Devil on Lammas Night (1970)
- Penmarric (1971)
- Cashelmara (1974)
- The Rich Are Different (1977)
- Sins of the Fathers (1980)
- The Wheel of Fortune (1984)

=== The Starbridge series ===
- Glittering Images (1987)
- Glamorous Powers (1988)
- Ultimate Prizes (1989)
- Scandalous Risks (1990)
- Mystical Paths (1992)
- Absolute Truths (1994)

=== The St. Benet's trilogy ===
- The Wonder Worker (US title) / A Question of Integrity (UK title) (1997)
- The High Flyer (2000)
- The Heartbreaker (2004)
