= Mumbles Lighthouse =

Lighthouse in Wales

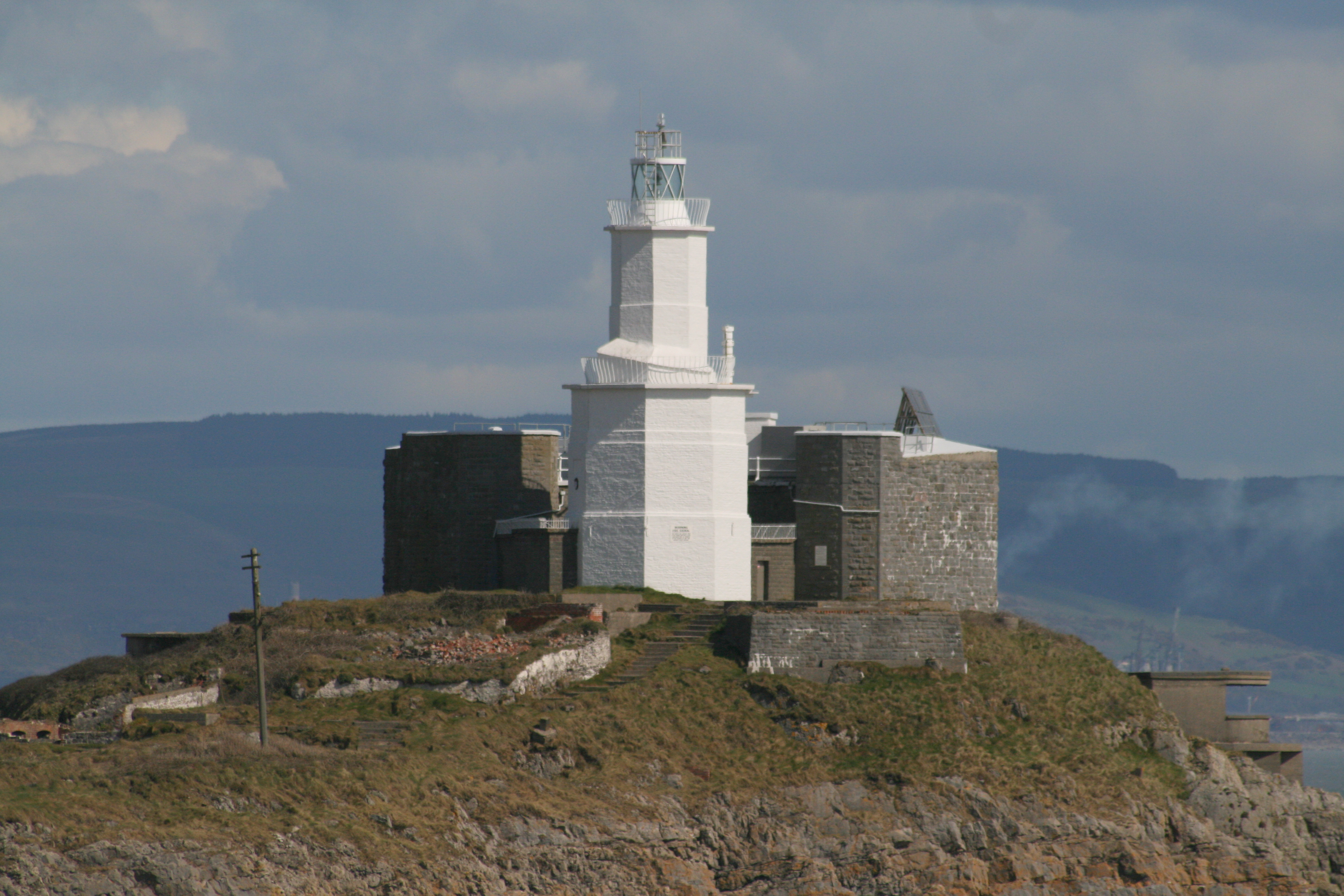
- The Lighthouse at Mumbles Head
- Location: Mumbles Head; Swansea; Wales
- Coordinates: 51.566853°N 3.971235°W

Tower
- Constructed: 1794
- Construction: brick tower
- Automated: 1934
- Height: 17 metres (56 ft)
- Shape: two-stage octagonal tower with double balcony and lantern
- Markings: white tower and lantern
- Power source: solar power
- Operator: Trinity House
- Heritage: Grade II* listed building, National Monuments of Wales

Light
- Focal height: 35 metres (115 ft)
- Lens: biformed pair of Tideland Ml300 beacons
- Intensity: 13,700 candela
- Range: 15 nautical miles (28 km; 17 mi)
- Characteristic: Fl (4) W 20s.

Mumbles Lighthouse, completed in 1794, is a lighthouse located in Mumbles, near Swansea. The structure, which sits on the outer of two islands off Mumbles Head, is clearly visible from any point along the five mile sweep of Swansea Bay. Along with the nearby lifeboat station, it is the most photographed landmark in the village.

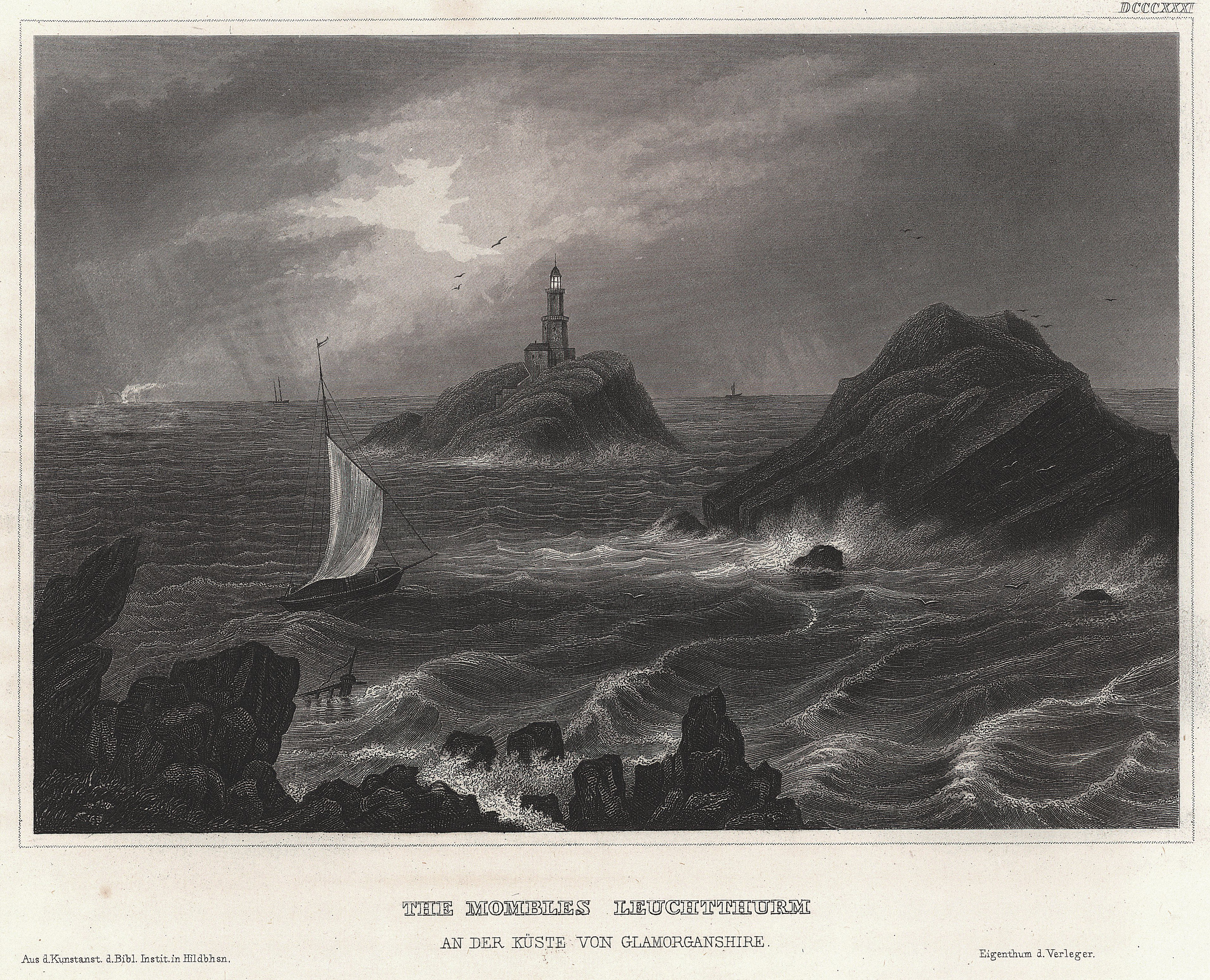
Mumbles Lighthouse (1857)

The tower has two tiers and initially two open coal fire lights were displayed. These open coal fire lights were difficult to maintain and were soon replaced by a single oil-powered light within a cast-iron lantern.

In 1860, the oil-powered light was upgraded to a dioptric light and the Mumbles Battery, a fort that surrounds the tower, was built by the War Department.

In 1905, an occulting mechanism, where the light was made to flash, was fitted. This was partially automated in 1934.

By 1977, the cast-iron lantern had deteriorated beyond repair and was removed. A different lantern was added in 1987.

In 1995, the main light was replaced and an array of solar panels and emergency monitoring equipment were added.

In 2017, the lighthouse underwent further upgrades, including the installation of LED lanterns, improvements to the solar power system, and the replacement of all control and monitoring electronics.

== See also ==
- List of lighthouses in Wales
- Trinity House
