= Rotherslade =

Beach in Gower, Wales

Coordinates: 51°34′04″N 4°00′22″W

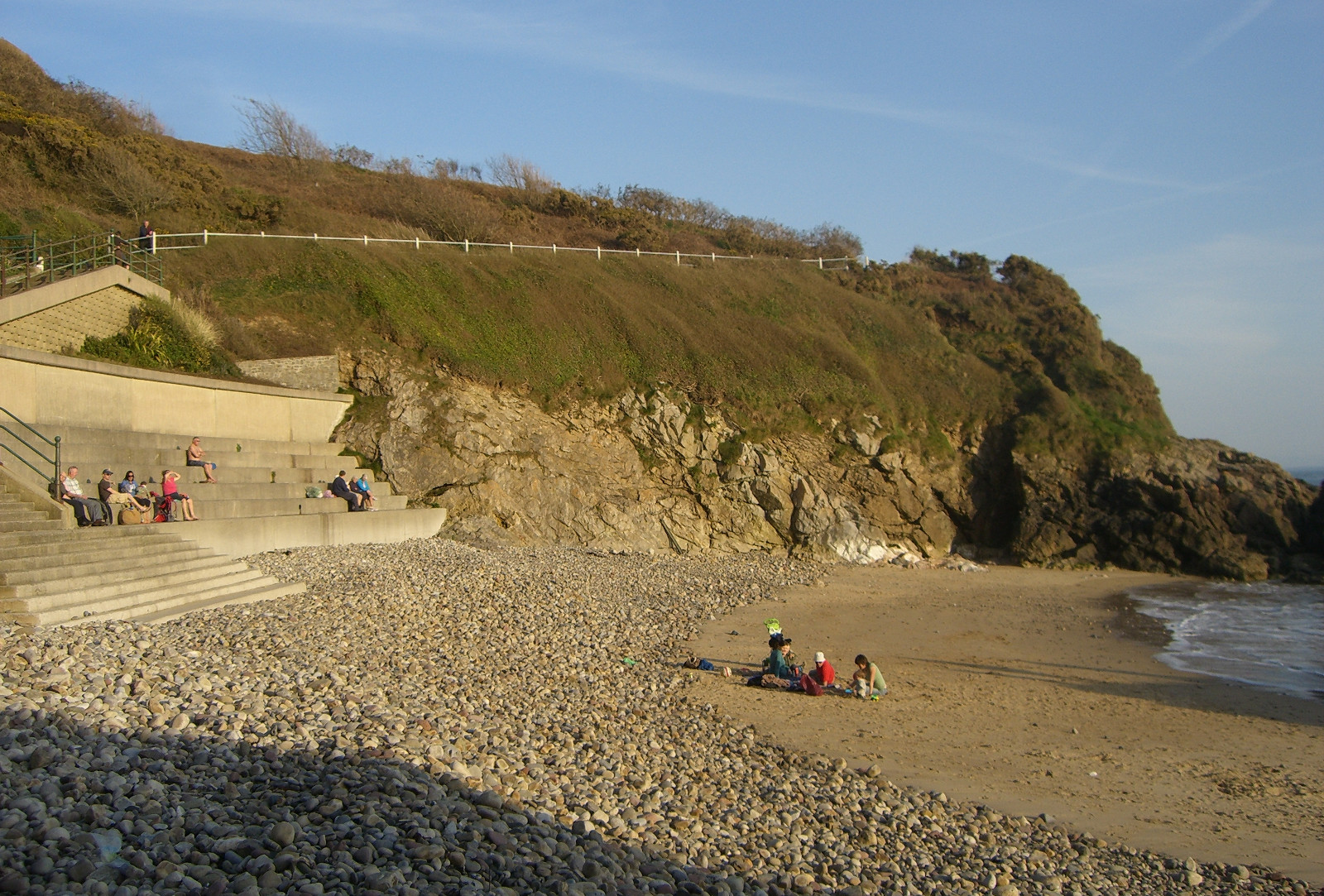
View of Rotherslade Bay

Rotherslade is a small stretch of sandy beach at the eastern end of Langland Bay in the south Gower Peninsula, Wales. Previously known as 'Little Langland', it only exists as a separate beach at high tide. At low tide it is continuous with Langland Bay.

== Concrete structures ==
At the head of Rotherslade once stood a large concrete structure. This was the site of a beach café and dance hall. However, it was left abandoned and derelict for many years and became a major eyesore to some people. After much discussion, including the idea of getting the Army to use explosives to demolish it, in the new millennium the structure was knocked down and replaced with concrete terracing.

On the top level of the terrace is a small café which is open for business on most days of the year, as well as public toilets. The cliff path from the Mumbles to Langland Bay and Caswell runs directly outside the café, which also has an outside seating area overlooking the beach.

== Beach huts ==
Above the concrete terrace are a number of rows of privately owned beach huts, which are located on another concrete terrace structure.

== Road access ==
The beach is serviced by Rotherslade Road which runs from the busy, multi-junction, Langland Corner and has a number of large houses and maisonettes on its eastern side, but only a small hotel and a few houses at the top end on its western side. The road has never seen its own bus service, mainly due to the fact there is no turning space at the beach end.

== Osborne Hotel ==
From 1892 until the final years of the 20th Century, Rotherslade hosted the Osborne Hotel. The famous Impressionist artist, Alfred Sisley, stayed in the Hotel during his honeymoon in 1897. While there, he painted at least eleven views around the Bay. These included two views of Langland Bay, and six views of Rotherslade Bay from different angles, some in stormy or misty weather. He also made three views of the large rock (Storr Rock, then known as Donkey Rock) close to the entrance to the Tor Cave. His painting of 'Donkey Rock in the Evening' now belongs to the National Museum of Wales in Cardiff.

During the 20th century the hotel was often frequented by visiting rugby and cricket teams playing at the St. Helens ground in nearby Swansea. The hotel fell on hard times and after it lay derelict for a short period, it was demolished in 2003. It was replaced by a large complex of luxury apartments, known as 'The Osborne Apartments', that were completed in 2006. A public right-of-way has been maintained from Rotherslade Road, on new steel staging and steps to emerge on the sharp bend in Langland Bay Road.

== Tor Cave ==
The construction of the Osborne Hotel gave rise to the discovery of Rother's Tor Cave. In 1892, numerous prehistoric finds, including a mammoth's tooth, were found here and, like most of the other finds from Gower caves, are kept on public display in Swansea Museum. Rother's Tor Cave was filled in and sealed to secure the foundations of the hotel.
