= Clyne River =

River in south Wales

Coordinates: 51.59814°N 3.996706°W

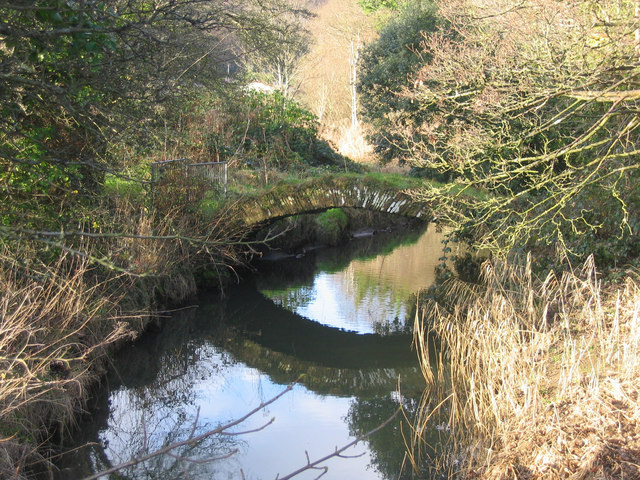
- An 18th Century bridge called the Roman Bridge crosses the river near its mouth at Blackpill, in western Swansea.
- Native name: Afon Clun (Welsh)

Location
- Country: United Kingdom, Wales
- Region: South Wales, United Kingdom
- Cities: Three Crosses, Dunvant, Killay, Blackpill

Physical characteristics
- Source
  - location: Fairwood Common, Swansea, Wales
- Length: 8.0 km (5.0 mi)
- Discharge
  - location: Swansea Bay, near Blackpill

The Clyne River (Welsh: Afon Clun) is a river in Swansea, south Wales. It has a total length of 6.5 miles (10.5 km), and flows through the Clyne Valley Country Park for much of its length.

== Course ==
The river rises from a series of springs on the northern fringe of Fairwood Common, between the towns of Three Crosses and Dunvant. It then flows in a southeasterly direction, less than a mile from the westernmost suburbs of Swansea. Although numerous streams join the river, the largest coming from Sketty, they are all unnamed. The Clyne meets the sea at the seaside village of Blackpill. The river is often believed to be the "Black pill", or black stream, that gave its name to the settlement. In fact, it is often referred to as the Blackpill stream, but this is not so. The Black Pill itself is a small brook to the west.

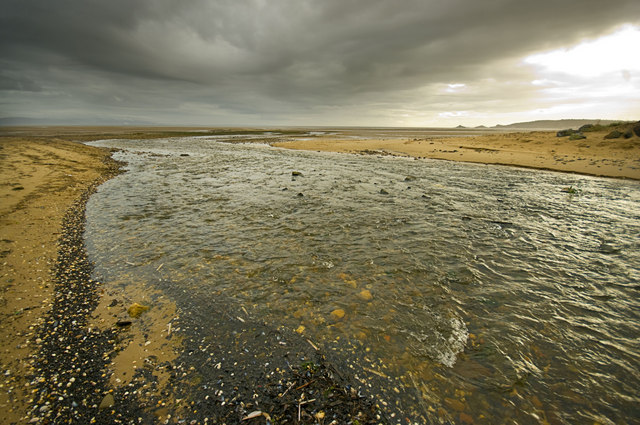
The river's mouth at Swansea Bay frequently attracts birds who catch their food there.

Several old industrial relics from the past line the river in Clyne Valley. In the past, many watermills are believed to have been built along the river, but none remain.

== History ==
Until Victorian times, the river was used to harness power via water mills. Being far from the industrial hub of Swansea, the river was not subject to much pollution from the docks and copper works in the city. Despite the river remaining an ideal habitat for them, fish that swam up the river to spawn were driven away by the pollution in Swansea Bay, once a famous spot for fishing. The vast oyster beds (which gave the area of Oystermouth its name) disappeared, and the variety of birds that once came to the river mouth to feed were driven away. However, since the water quality in Swansea Bay has improved, the fish and birds are returning to the river in droves.

== Environment ==
The steep-sided, wooded river valley dates from glacial times and contains a wide variety of vegetation and habitats - woodland, grassland, and wetland. Evidence of its agricultural and industrial history was found in the valley, from a Bronze Age axe-head (now in Swansea Museum) discovered in Clyne Wood to relics of WW2 defences along the route of the old railway line which ran the length of Clyne Valley. This was part of the main rail link between South and North Wales at one time. The old railway track was redeveloped by Swansea Council as a bike path within Clyne Valley Country Park, connecting Swansea Bay Bike Path to Gowerton. Despite its beauty, Clyne Valley retains its dark and dangerous side: the 'lake' halfway up the valley is sixteen feet deep; in the rainy season, Clyne River floods parts of the valley floor, creating deep, impassable mud pools; most of the industrial relics are unstable; and it is also easy to get lost in the dense woodland.
