= Limeslade Mystery =

Unsolved murder

The Limeslade Mystery or Madame X Mystery was a murder which occurred in Wales in 1929. The crime was never solved.

== Background ==
Kate Jackson (1885–1929) was a mysterious woman who claimed to be born in India and told her husband she was the author Ethel M. Dell. A birth certificate gave the name Kate Atkinson, born in Lancashire the daughter of Agnes and John Atkinson. She said she had purchased this from a girl, but this appears to be her true identity.

In her teens around 1904 she went to London hoping to become an actress. She lived as common law wife to a Leopold le Grys and styled herself "Mollie le Grys".

In 1914 she began a con trick on a George Harrison which began with her fainting in his presence after a minor car accident at Charing Cross Road she got him to take her to lunch. This turned into an affair. She told Harrison she was pregnant and asked £40 for an abortion. He paid this, but she began repeatedly asking for sums and it effectively turned into blackmail. A weekly payment of £30 became normal. However, Harrison paid this by embezzling funds from his workplace.

She married Tom Jackson, a war veteran, in Cardiff around 1919. It is unclear how they met. She gave multiple stories of her origins. They initially lived in Kate's property: a farmhouse in Surrey. They had an adopted daughter, Betty. Around 1927 they moved to a small remote bungalow in the Mumbles in south Wales. She told the neighbours her name was Kate but Tom and close friends still called her Mollie.

Kate lived quite extravagantly for a fishmonger's wife and appeared to live beyond her theoretical means, indicating some hidden wealth or unknown income. Every Wednesday she received a letter containing £30 cash from a source unknown to her husband - George Harrison. This long-running blackmail was revealed in 1927 when Harrison was put on trial for embezzling £19000. He claimed £8000 of this was to supply the regular payments to the woman he knew as Mollie le Grys. Whilst this did not bring her a fortune, it was far above the average weekly wage, and it allowed her many additional comforts. However, as with any crime of this nature, it had a potential to backfire, and Kate lived in fear of this.

== The Incident ==
On Monday 4 February 1929, on Plunch Lane, in the tiny hamlet of Limeslade on the edge of The Mumbles, Jackson was attacked.

Just after 10pm, Jackson and her neighbour Olive Dimick were returning from the Tivoli Cinema, having left home together at 6pm. Olive had only just said goodbye to Kate when she heard her scream. She went outside and found Kate near the back door of Kate's neighbouring bungalow "Kenilworth", with her husband bent over her. She was bleeding from the head and barely conscious. They moved her to the back door. Olive saw that Tom was in his underwear and told him to get dressed. Olive's husband Sydney arrived, as did another neighbour, Rose Gammon.

Mr Jackson reappeared with clothes on and Mrs Gammon offered to call for a doctor, but he declined saying he would fetch someone if she got worse. As Kate was bleeding from the head this was strangely complacent. Tom eventually went to another neighbour Mrs Janet Philips and phoned Dr Neil Seddon Taylor of the Mumbles who agreed to come out. They met at Boyle's Garage, 100m from their house. Tom told Mrs Philips that Kate had recently received threatening letters regarding an embezzlement trial two years previously.

The doctor arrived and found that Kate's wounds were very serious. He shaved back her hair and stitched the more serious wounds. She complained that this hurt. She did not reply when questioned who did it, but then uttered a single, but inexplicable word: "gorse". She repeated this three or four times.

The doctor told Tom to call the local hospital, call a taxi to get there, and call the police to report the incident. He went to Mrs Philips, but only called a taxi. On return the doctor said the hospital would only admit her with prior notification. This time Tom went to a different neighbour (perhaps not to disturb Mrs Philips a third time): John Skidmore who lived at Marydale bungalow to the south. He told Skidmore that his wife had been attacked on her way back from the pictures (i.e. Cinema).

The taxi arrived and the driver helped get Kate onto the back seat then drove with Tom to the hospital. The doctor followed in his own car. They went to Swansea General Hospital. Tom did not stay at the hospital, but went back to Limeslade with the taxi driver. He had gone by the time hospital staff arrived to interview him about the incident. They informed the police a little after 3am and they then called Dr Taylor for more details. They went to the hospital then to Limeslade to interview Tom, arriving a little before 5am. Tom was slow to answer the door.

The police found broken glass in the pool of blood near the back door. Tom claimed he heard a noise at 10.45pm and found Kate near the back door just as Olive ran up.

Mrs Philip only became aware of the seriousness of the attack through the police. Olive said Kate had a fear of strange cars and there was one opposite their house on the night in question.

Superintendent Harry Fox of Mumbles arrived later in the morning and was joined by Detective inspector Frederick William Gough and the Chief Constable, Captain Thomas Rawson.

== Revelations ==
An x-ray revealed Kate had a fractured skull. There were at least nine separate wounds on her head.

Press descending on Limeslade quickly discovered that Kate was "Madame X" a mystery witness in a London embezzlement trial involving a man called Harrison who had embezzled the money on her behalf.

Both Tom and the neighbour Olive confirmed that Kate had a deep fear of being discovered and had wanted to live in Limeslade due to its remoteness.

Police guards stayed with Mrs Jackson in the hospital hoping she would recover enough to name her assailant. On Saturday 9 February she became lucid and was able to answer questions. The police interviewed her at noon but gleaned no useful information.

Her condition deteriorated overnight. A final attempt was made to interview her. She died just after noon on 10 February. The official cause of death was a heart attack brought about by the trauma.

As the only suspect, Tom was charged with murder two weeks after the death and put on trial in July. A tyre lever had been found concealed in the kitchen but there was no positive evidence whatsoever to link Tom to the crime nor was any motive evidenced. The judge told the jury he saw no evidence of a third party involvement. Tom's nonchalant attitude did not help things and is not easily explained. However he had nothing to gain by her death. He was found not guilty in July 1929. The media generally supported this viewpoint.

The word "gorse" was never explained. In terms of the story as a whole it may have been "grys" rather than "gorse". Perhaps Leopold Le Grys also held a grudge. Leopold le Grys certainly existed: he was born in 1876, lived and worked in London as a portrait artist and died in Kensington in 1971. He married Adal Collins in 1922.

== See also ==
- List of unsolved murders in the United Kingdom
