= Horton Beach =

Beach in Port Eynon Bay, Wales

Coordinates: 51°32′52″N 4°12′3″W

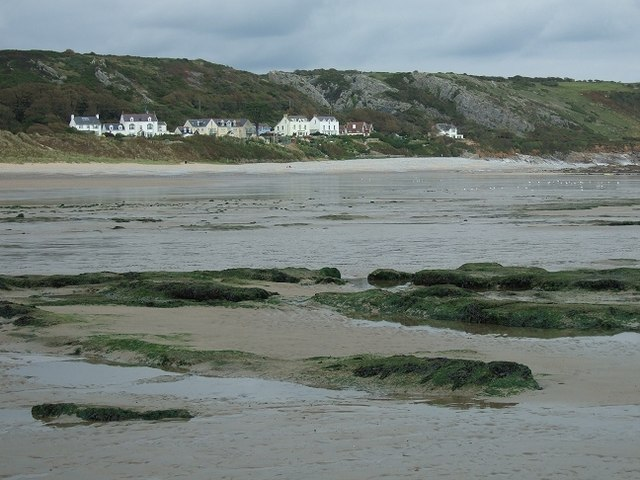
Horton – Beach and Village

Horton Beach is located in Port Eynon Bay on the south coast of the Gower Peninsula in Wales.

It is reached from the nearby village of Horton via a steep hill, and has a car park sited a few minutes' walk away. Despite its accessibility and its popularity with surfers, the beach is usually very quiet and it has sand even at high tide.
