= Gower Peninsula =

Peninsula in Wales

Coordinates: 51.6°N 4.1°W

Gower Peninsula: Welsh: Penrhyn Gŵyr
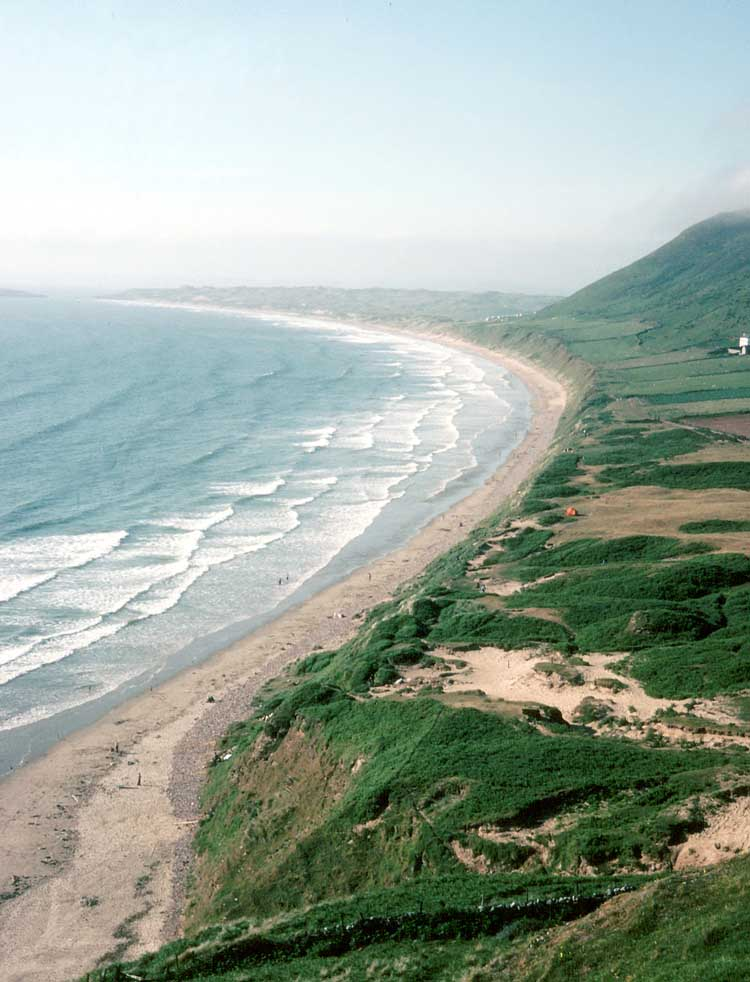
- Rhossili beach

- Location within Swansea
- Population: 76,400
- OS grid reference: SS465904
- Principal area: Swansea
- Preserved county: West Glamorgan
- Country: Wales
- Sovereign state: United Kingdom
- Postcode district: Swansea
- Police: South Wales
- Fire: Mid and West Wales
- Ambulance: Welsh
- UK Parliament: Gower
- Senedd Cymru – Welsh Parliament: Gower

The Gower Peninsula (Welsh: Penrhyn Gŵyr), or simply Gower (Gŵyr), is a peninsula in the south-west of Wales. It is the most westerly part of the historic county of Glamorgan, and is now within the City and County of Swansea. It projects towards the Bristol Channel. In 1956, the majority of Gower became the first area in the United Kingdom to be designated an Area of Outstanding Natural Beauty.

Until 1974, Gower was administered as a rural district. It was then merged with the county borough of Swansea. From 1974 to 1996, it formed the Swansea district. Since 1996, Gower has been administered as part of the unitary authority of the City and County of Swansea.

Since its establishment in 1999, the Gower Senedd constituency has only elected Labour members. The Gower constituency in Westminster had previously also elected only Labour Members of Parliament (MPs) since 1908; the longest run (with Normanton and Makerfield) of any UK constituency. This ended in 2015 when the Conservatives took the seat. In 2017, it returned to Labour. The area of both constituencies covers the peninsula and the outer Gower areas of Clydach, Gowerton, Gorseinon, Felindre, Garnswllt and encompasses the area of the historic Lordship of Gower apart from the city of Swansea.

== Geography ==
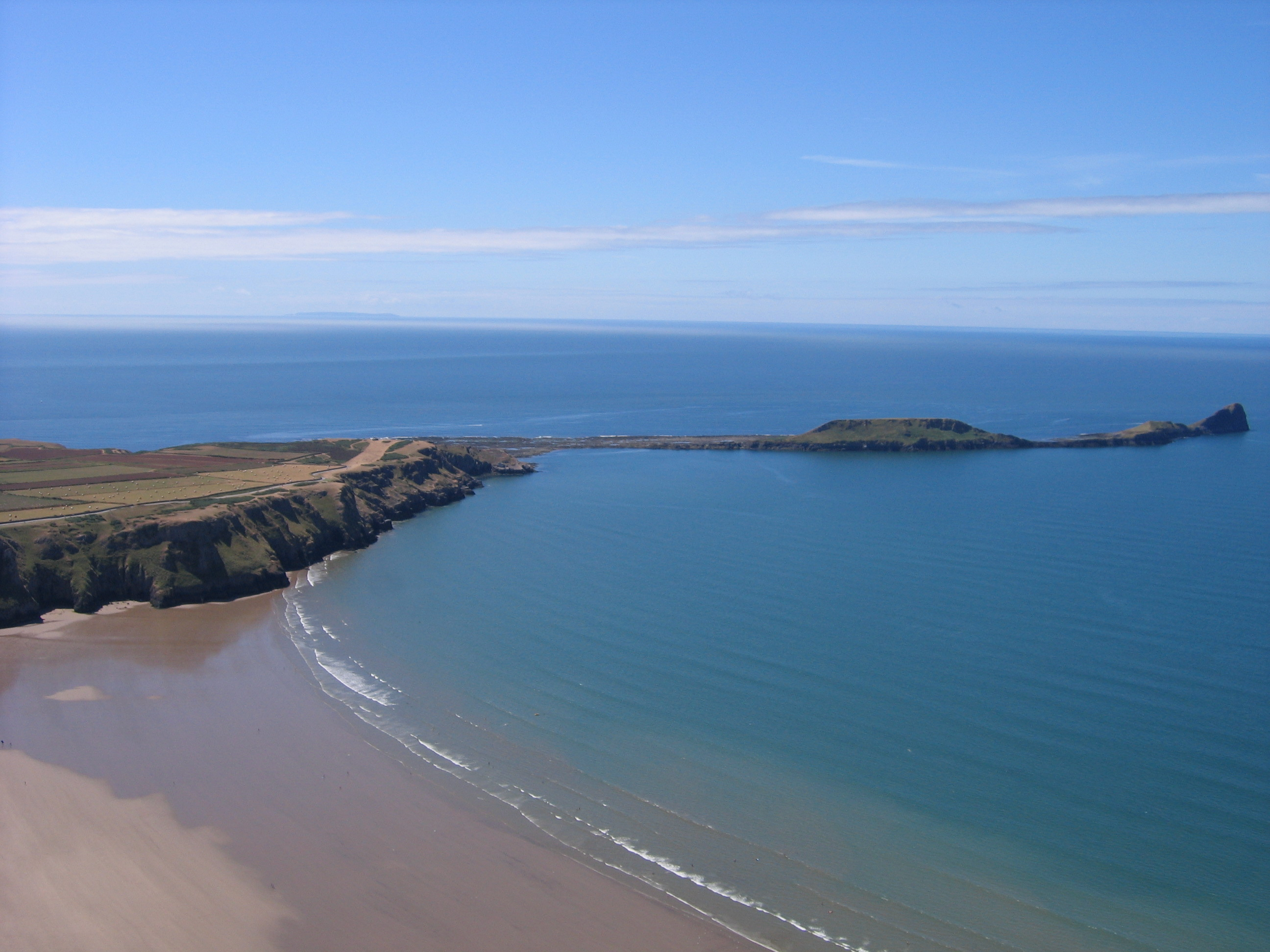
Worm's Head causeway exposed at low tide

About 70 square miles (180 km^{2}) in area, Gower is known for its coastline, popular with walkers and outdoor enthusiasts, especially surfers. Gower has many caves, including Paviland Cave and Minchin Hole Cave. The peninsula is bounded by the Loughor Estuary to the north and Swansea Bay to the east. Gower Area of Outstanding Natural Beauty covers 188 km^{2}, including most of the peninsula west of Crofty, Three Crosses, Upper Killay, Blackpill and Bishopston. The highest point of Gower is The Beacon at Rhossili Down at 193 metres (633 feet) overlooking Rhossili Bay. Pwll Du and the Bishopton Valley form a statutory Local Nature Reserve.

The southern coast consists of a series of small, rocky or sandy bays, such as Langland and Three Cliffs, and larger beaches such as Port Eynon, Rhossili and Oxwich Bay. The north of the peninsula has fewer beaches, and is home to the cockle-beds of Penclawdd.

The northern coast is mainly salt marsh, and is used for raising Gower salt marsh lamb which was registered as a Protected Designation of Origin in 2021 under UK law and in 2023 under EU law.

The interior is mainly farmland and common land. The population mainly resides in small villages and communities with some suburban development in eastern Gower; part of the Swansea Urban Area.

== History ==
In the caves of Bacon Hole and Minchin Hole on the southern coast of the Gower, remains of Pleistocene aged animals have been found, primarily animals present in the area during the Last Interglacial and the beginning of the Last Glacial Period (around 130,000-87,000 years ago) when the area had a similar climate to today, including animals such as straight-tusked elephants, the narrow-nosed rhinoceros, bison, cave lions, wolves, cave hyenas (who at times used the caves as dens), red foxes, red deer, roe deer, and fallow deer, as well as woolly mammoths in younger layers, with later layers in the caves dating to cooler phases of the Last Glacial having cold adapted species like reindeer and wolverines.

=== Stone Age ===
Wales is known to have been inhabited since at least the Upper Paleolithic period, and the Gower Peninsula has been the scene of several important archaeological discoveries. Paviland Cave (also known as Goat's Hole) has yielded stone leaf shaped points of the Lincombian-Ranisian-Jerzmanowician (LRJ) technocomplex, which are now thought to have been produced by some of the oldest modern human groups in Europe. While not dated, a LRJ site in Germany has been dated to 45,000 years ago. Paviland Cave as well as Long Hole have also yielded artifacts of the later early Upper Palaeolithic Aurignacian technocomplex, which likely date to around or somewhat later than 37,000 years ago. Paviland Cave in particular shows the richest evidence for an Aurignacian occupation of any site in Britain. In 1823, William Buckland discovered a fairly complete Upper Paleolithic human skeleton in Paviland Cave. They named their find the "Red Lady of Paviland", because the skeleton is dyed in red ochre, though later investigators determined it was actually a male. This skeleton is one of the oldest ceremonial burial anywhere in Western Europe. The most recent re-calibrated radiocarbon dating in 2009 indicates that the skeleton can be dated to around 34,000 Before Present (BP). It has been suggested that the skeleton is related to the Aurignacian occupation at Paviland Cave. Cat's Hole and Paviland Cave have yielded tanged stone points of the early Gravettian technocomplex, likely dating to around 33,000 years ago. Stone tools from Paviland Cave also indicates the occupation of the Gower during the much later late Upper Palaeolithic Creswellian period, around 15-12,000 years ago.

In 1937 the Parc Cwm long cairn was identified as a Severn-Cotswold type of chambered long barrow. Also known as Parc le Breos burial chamber, it is a partly restored Neolithic chambered tomb. The megalithic burial chamber, or "cromlech", was built around 6,000BP.

In 2010, George Nash, an academic from Bristol University exploring Cathole Cave, discovered a rock drawing of a red deer from the same period. Uranium–thorium dating later found a minimum age of 12,500–14,500 years BP for the engraving.

Cave art in Bacon Hole cave, Gower Peninsula, South Wales: horizontal stripes of haematite-based pigment

On the wall of a side chamber of the nearby Bacon Hole cave is a panel of ten red horizontal stripes, which were first discovered and identified as cave art in 1912. Later researchers reassessed them as a natural formation. In 2022, however, a team led by Nash rediscovered not only the stripes but other markings made by humans, such as finger dots and geometrical forms. Analysis showed that the red colour came from a haematite-based pigment, and the cave art dated to at least 17,100 years BP, making it the oldest cave art known in Great Britain.

=== Bronze Age ===
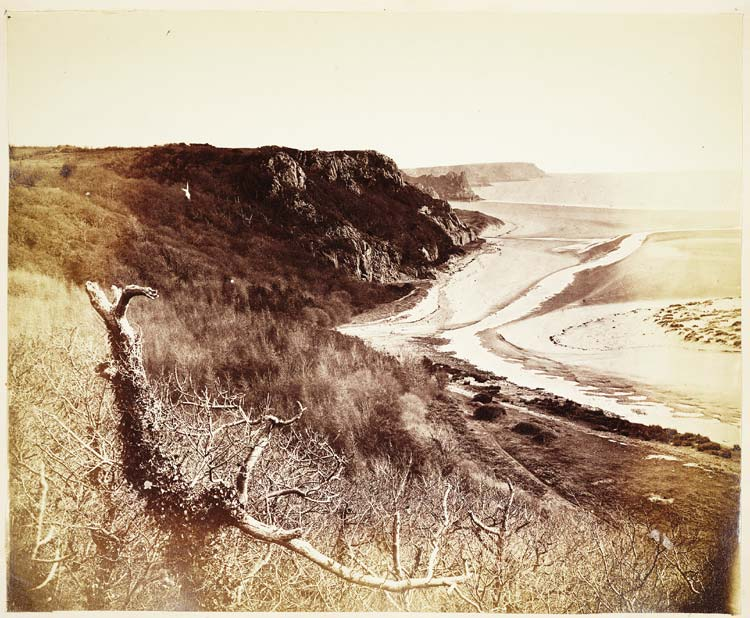
Crawley Rocks, Gower (c. 1850)

Gower is also home to menhirs or standing stones from the Bronze Age. Of the nine stones, eight remain today. One of the most notable of the stones is Arthur's stone near Cefn Bryn. Its 25-ton capstone was most likely a glacial erratic (a piece of rock/conglomerate carried by glacial ice some distance from the rock outcrop from which it came): the builders dug under it and supported it with upright stones to create a burial chamber. The remains of Sweyne Howes on Rhossili Down, Penmaen Burrows Tomb (Pen-y-Crug) and Nicholaston Long Cairn are three other well-known Neolithic chambered tombs. During the Bronze Age, people continued to use local caves for shelter and for burying their dead. Bronze Age evidence, such as funeral urns, pottery and human remains, has been found in Tooth Cave at Llethryd, Culver Hole (Port Eynon) and Cathole Cave. With the transition into the Iron Age, hill forts (timber fortifications on hill tops and coastal promontories) and earthworks began to appear. The largest example of this type of Iron Age settlement in the Gower Peninsula is Cilifor Top near Llanrhidian.

=== Roman era ===
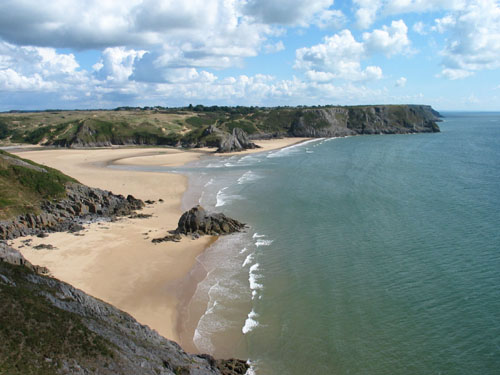
Tor Bay and Three Cliffs Bay

Roman occupation brought new settlement. The Romans built Leucarum, a rectangular or trapezoidal fort at the mouth of the River Loughor, in the late 1st century AD to house a regiment of Roman auxiliary troops. Its remains are located beneath the town of Loughor. Stone defences were added to the earthen ditch and rampart by AD 110 and the fort was occupied until the middle or end of that century. However, it was later abandoned for a time and in the early 3rd century the ditch naturally silted up. It appears to have been brought back into use during the reign of Carausius who was worried about Irish raids, but was abandoned again before the 4th century. A Norman castle was later built on the site.

=== Anglicisation ===
Following the Norman invasion of Wales the commote of Gŵyr passed into the hands of English-speaking barons, and its southern part soon became Anglicised. In 1203 King John (1199–1216) granted the Lordship of Gower to William III de Braose (died 1211) for the service of one knight's fee. It remained with the Braose family until the death of William de Braose, 2nd Baron Braose in 1326, when it passed from the family to the husband of one of his two daughters and co-heiresses, Aline and Joan. In 1215 a local lord, Rhys Gryg of Deheubarth, claimed control of the peninsula, but in 1220 he ceded control to the Anglo-Norman lords, perhaps on the orders of his overlord, Llywelyn ap Iorwerth.

As an Anglo-Norman peninsula isolated from its Welsh hinterland but with coastal links to other parts of south Wales and southwest England, it developed its own Gower dialect of English.

=== Glamorgan ===
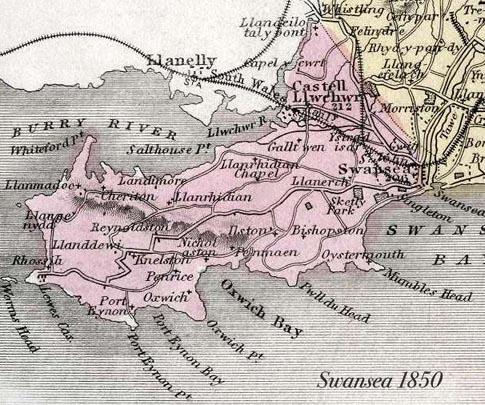
Map of the Gower Peninsula (1850)

In 1535, the Act of Union resulted in the Lordship of Gower becoming part of the historic county of Glamorgan with the southwest part becoming the hundred of Swansea.

=== Present day ===
Agriculture remains important to the area with tourism playing an ever-increasing role in the local economy. The peninsula has a Championship status golf course at Fairwood Park just off Fairwood Common, which twice hosted the Welsh PGA Championships in the 1990s. Meanwhile, the Gower Golf Club at Three Crosses hosts the West Wales Open, a two-day tournament on Wales' professional golf tour, the Dragon Tour. Gower is part of the Swansea travel to work area.

== Landmarks ==
There are six castles on the Gower Peninsula: Landimore Castle—also known as Bovehill Castle—Oystermouth Castle, Oxwich Castle, Pennard Castle, Penrice Castle, Weobley Castle and numerous cairns and standing stones.

Four beaches have Blue Flag beach and Seaside (2006) awards for their high standards: Bracelet Bay, Caswell Bay, Langland Bay and Port Eynon Bay. Five other beaches have been given the Green Coast Award 2005 for "natural, unspoiled environment": Rhossili Bay, Mewslade Bay, Tor Bay, Pwll Du Bay, and Limeslade Bay.

Other beaches:

- Swansea Bay
- Mumbles Beach
- Rotherslade
- Brandy Cove
- Three Cliffs Bay
- Oxwich Bay
- Slade Bay
- Horton Bay
- Burry Holms
- Blue Pool Bay
- Broughton Bay
- Whiteford Sands

=== Llethryd Tooth Cave ===
The Llethryd Tooth Cave, or Tooth Hole cave, is a Bronze Age ossuary site in a limestone cave, about 1,500 yards (1.4 km) north north west of the Parc Cwm long cairn cromlech, on private land along the Parc Cwm valley, near the village of Llethryd. In 1961 the cave was rediscovered by cavers, who found human bones. An excavation was carried out by D.P. Webley & J. Harvey in 1962 revealing the disarticulated remains (i.e. not complete skeletons) of six adults and two children, dated to the Early Bronze Age or Beaker culture. Other finds are now held at the National Museum of Wales, Cardiff: Early Bronze Age, or Beaker, collared urn pottery; flaked knives; a scraper; flint flakes; a bone spatula; a needle & bead; and animal bones – the remains of domesticated animals, cat and dog. Archaeologists Alasdair Whittle and Michael Wysocki note that this period of occupation may be "significant", with respect to Parc Cwm long cairn, as it is "broadly contemporary with the secondary use of the tomb". In their article published in The Proceedings of the Prehistoric Society (vol.64 (1998), pp. 139–82) Whittle and Wysocki suggest corpses may have been placed in caves near the cromlech until they decomposed, when the bones were moved to the tomb – a process known as excarnation.

At 1,525 m long (nearly 1 mile), the Tooth Cave is the longest cave in Gower. It has tight and flooded sections, and so is kept locked for safety.

== Representation in the media ==
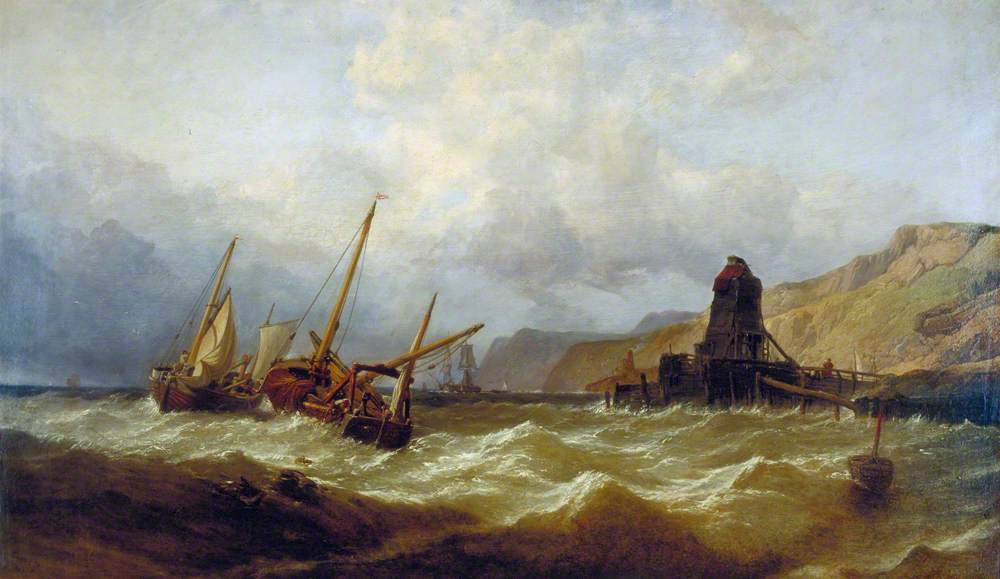
Oxwich Bay by Clarkson Stanfield, 1851

- Mumbles set the scene for a six-part drama Ennals Point (1982) featuring Welsh actor Philip Madoc. The series focused on the local lifeboat crew.
- The Susan Howatch novel The Wheel of Fortune (1984) is primarily set in and near the Gower Peninsula, which plays an important part in the plot of the novel.
- The film Gower Boy by artist Gee Vaucher and musician Huw Warren—a gentle, contemplative exploration of the Gower Peninsula in Wales—debuted at the 14th Raindance Film Festival (2006).
- Rhossili and Worm's Head feature in the Doctor Who episode "New Earth" (2006).
- Rhossili Bay beach has been a location for the Lloyds Banking Group adverts featuring the iconic black horse galloping along the miles of sandy beach.
- A fictional village in 1918, near The Worm's Head, is the location of a Charles Todd atmospheric mystery novel A Forgotten Place (2018).

== See also ==
- Gower (electoral ward)
- Gower (UK Parliament constituency)
- Gower dialect
- List of villages in Gower
- Cuisine of Gower

== Library ==
- Prehistoric Gower, The Early Archaeology of West Glamorgan, by J. G. Rutter, 1949 (published by Welsh Guides, York Street, Swansea)
- Gower, by Olive Phillips, 1956 (published by Robert Hale Limited, London)
- Gower Journey, by A. G. Thompson, c1960 (self published by the author, Principality Chambers, Swansea)
- Portrait of Gower, by Wynford Vaughan Thomas, 1976 (published by Robert Hale Limited, London) (ISBN 0709155778)
- The Gower Coast: A Coastline Walk And Guide To The History, Legends, Shipwrecks & Rescues, Smuggling, Castles & Caves, Including The Story Of The Dollar Ship, by George Edmunds, 1979 (ISBN 0906570018)
- The Gower Peninsula, by Lawrence Rich (for The National Trust) (ISBN 9781843592754)
- The Story of Gower, by Wendy Hughes, 1996 (ISBN 0863812171)
- Historic Gower, by Paul Davies, 1997 (ISBN 0715407325)
- Gower: A Guide to Ancient and Historical Monuments on the Gower Peninsula, by Diane M. Williams for Cadw: Welsh Historic Monuments, 1998 (ISBN 1 85760 073 8)
- Images of Wales: Gower Peninsula, by David Gwynn, 2002 (ISBN 075242615X)
- The People of Gower, by Derek Draisey, 2003 (ISBN 0954654404)
- Gower Rogues, by Derek Draisey, 2006 (ISBN 0954654439)
- Gower, by Jonathan Mullard (in The New Naturalist Library, HarperCollins) (ISBN 0007160666)
- Gower in History: Myth, People, Landscape, by Paul Ferris, 2009 (ISBN 9780956233202)
- Gower, by Nigel Jenkins & David Pearl, 2009 (ISBN 9781848510524)
- Real Gower, by Nigel Jenkins, 2014 (ISBN 9781781722190)
- Black Apples of Gower, by Iain Sinclair, 2015 (ISBN 978-1-908213-45-7)
