= Rest Bay =

Bay in Bridgend County Borough, Wales

Coordinates: 51.489°N 3.728°W

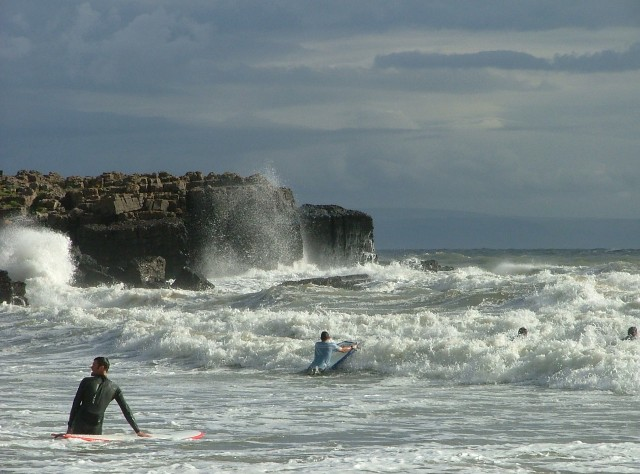
Surfing at Rest Bay

Rest Bay is a bay and beach near Porthcawl on the coast of Bridgend County Borough, Wales.

The long sandy beach is west facing and is popular with surfers, though facilities have been basic. There is a pay and display carpark. A cafe, Malc's, was located nearby.

Plans were approved in August 2017 to create a new watersports hub, which would include a new cafe, public toilets, changing rooms, a function room and a covered area for walkers. Part of the funding for the improvements came from £1.5 million of European Union funding.

Rest Bay is designated a Blue Flag beach based on the cleanliness of the water and the availability of local community educational activities.
