= Blue Pool Bay =

Cove on the coast of Wales

Coordinates: 51.61365°N 4.30038°W

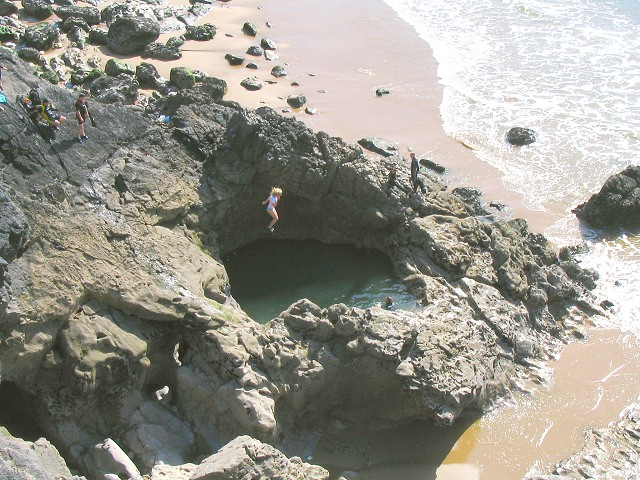
Pool at Blue Pool Corner

Blue Pool Bay is a small cove near the village of Llangennith in Gower, Wales. The cove is bordered by cliffs, and is accessible via a clifftop path and a steep, unstable path down to the beach. The beach is covered fully at high tide and takes its name from a large, natural rockpool. Rhossili Bay is nearby.

Since the release of a popular Tik Tok video showing the pool, there has been a drastic increase in footfall to the bay. This has resulted in heavy erosion on the path to the beach, as well as heavy littering, fly tipping and graffiti left by the now common crowds at the once little known location.

The bay can be dangerous due to the combination of no lifeguard and very strong currents.

== Description ==
The Bay is only reachable by footpath or from the neighbouring beach of Broughton Bay to the east.

At the west end of the bay is a natural rock arch, called the Blue Pool Arch or 3 Chimneys. The arch is completely submerged at high tide. Although traditionally thought to be bottomless, the eponymous rockpool is around 8 ft (2.4m) deep, and was formed naturally. The pool is completely uncovered at low tide, and separated from the sea by the beach. The pool is engulfed by the sea at high tide and becomes less defined. The beach is mostly sandy and surrounded by rocky cliffs. The beach is reachable by a rough coastal path leading down from the cliffs and from Spaniard Rocks and from Broughton Bay both at low tide. The depth mentioned here differs from the depth mentioned by the reference.
