= Limeslade Bay =

Landform in West Wales

Coordinates: 51.565°N 3.985°W

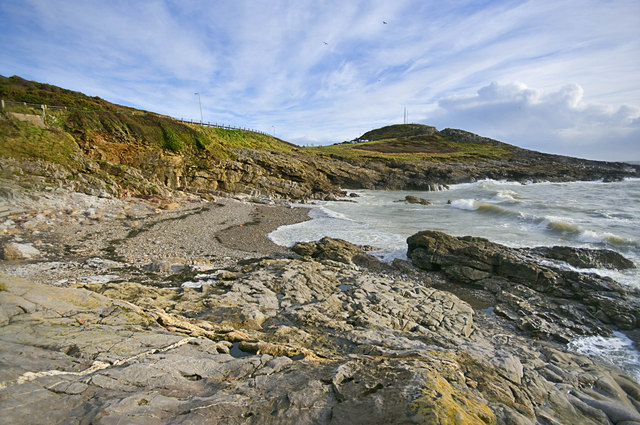
Limeslade Bay

Limeslade Bay is a small cove just to the west of Bracelet Bay in the south east corner of the Gower Peninsula, near Swansea in south Wales. It is a sheltered, mainly rocky beach with little sand. Bathing is possible. There is a car park in the adjacent Bracelet Bay. From Limeslade Bay there is a cliff walk to Langland Bay, about half a mile to the west.

Of note is an iron mine at the head of the bay, near the roadside. This is believed to have been worked from Roman times. It is now closed and sealed off. The bay has a varied and different geology from that of the neighbouring Bracelet Bay.

This is one of the many 'slades' one finds in Gower - small valleys or dells, usually opening on to the sea.

Limeslade was site of the Limeslade Mystery in 1929 - an unsolved murder.
