= Bracelet Bay =

Bay in the Gower Peninsula, Wales

Coordinates: 51.56519°N 3.97795°W

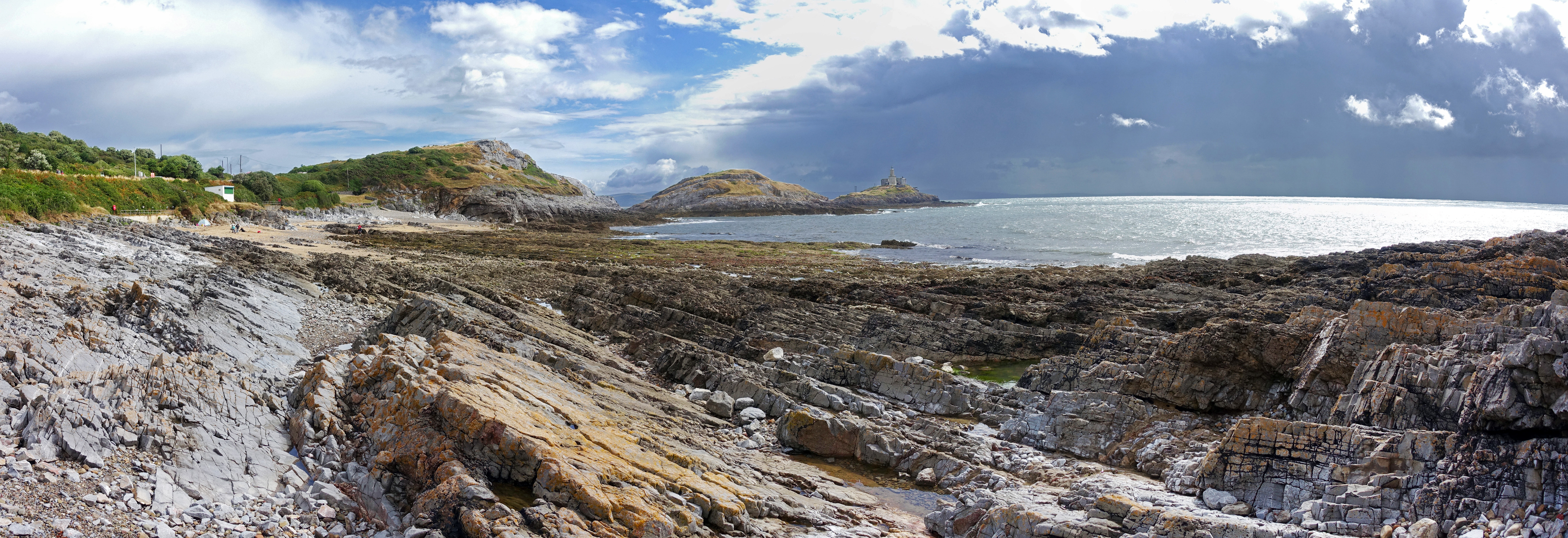
Bracelet Bay

Bracelet Bay is a small bay located on the southern coast of the Gower Peninsula. It is the first bay one encounters after leaving Swansea Bay and rounding Mumbles Head.

Surrounded by limestone cliffs, the bay is pebbly, with some sand. To the west, the bay is separated from Limeslade Bay by Tutt Hill, the location of a coastguard look-out station.

One of the bay's most notable feature is the iconic "Big Apple" kiosk, a concrete structure built in the 1930s as a roadside advertisement. While several similar kiosks were erected along the South Wales coast, the Bracelet Bay kiosk is the only one still standing. After being damaged by a vehicle in 2009, it underwent significant repairs in 2010. In 2019, it was officially designated a Grade II listed building, recognizing its historical significance.

The name 'Bracelet' is thought to be a corruption of 'Broad Slade'.

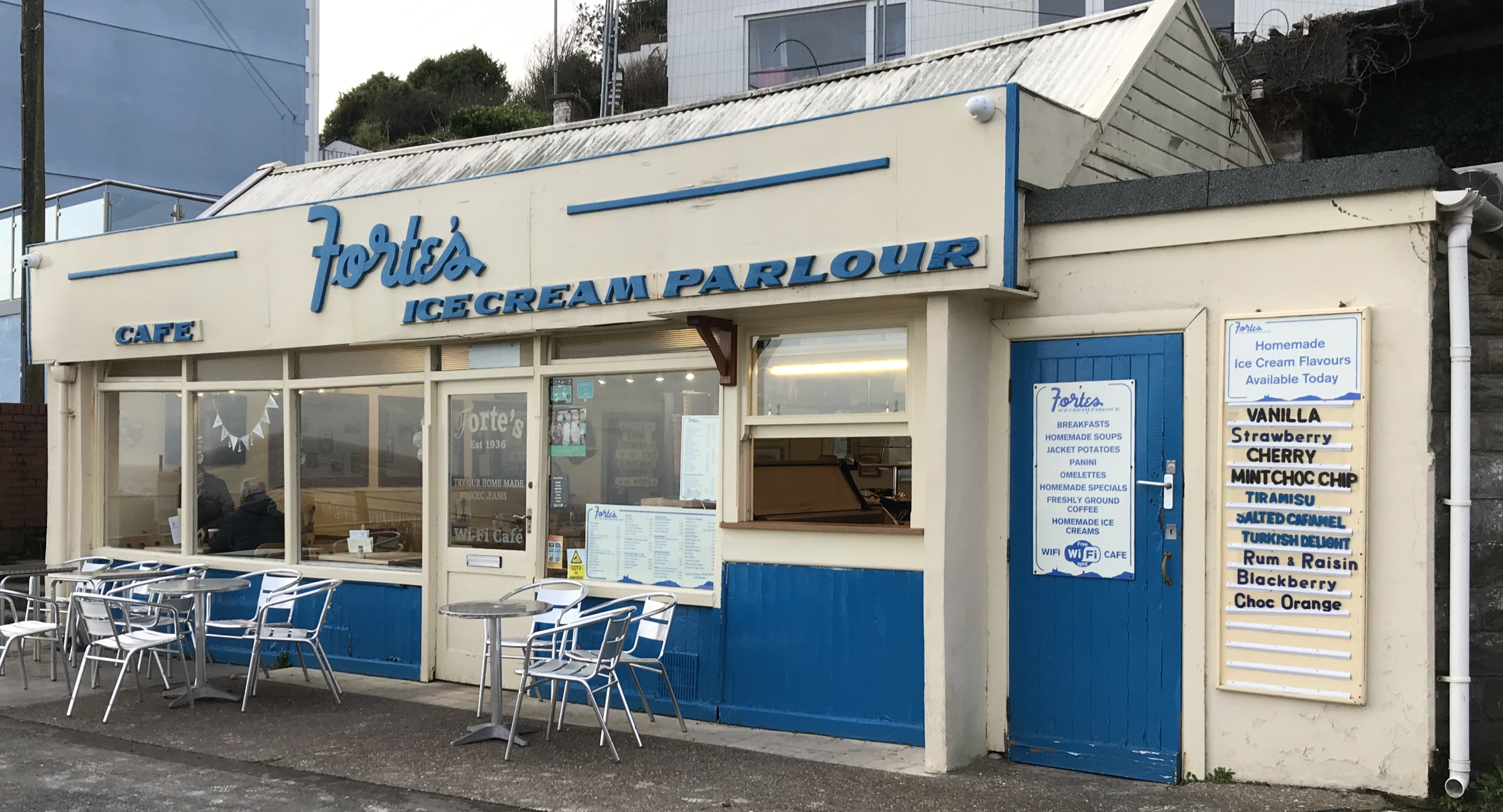
Forte's Ice Cream Parlour, Bracelet Bay

== Activities and tourism ==
Bracelet Bay is a prominent tourist destination for those seeking stunning sea views and enchanting coastal scenery; however, its shores are occasionally affected by strong water currents and active tidal movements that generate high waves, particularly during peak tide times and storms.
