= Swansea Bay =

Bay on the southern coast of Wales

Coordinates: 51°35′N 3°54′W

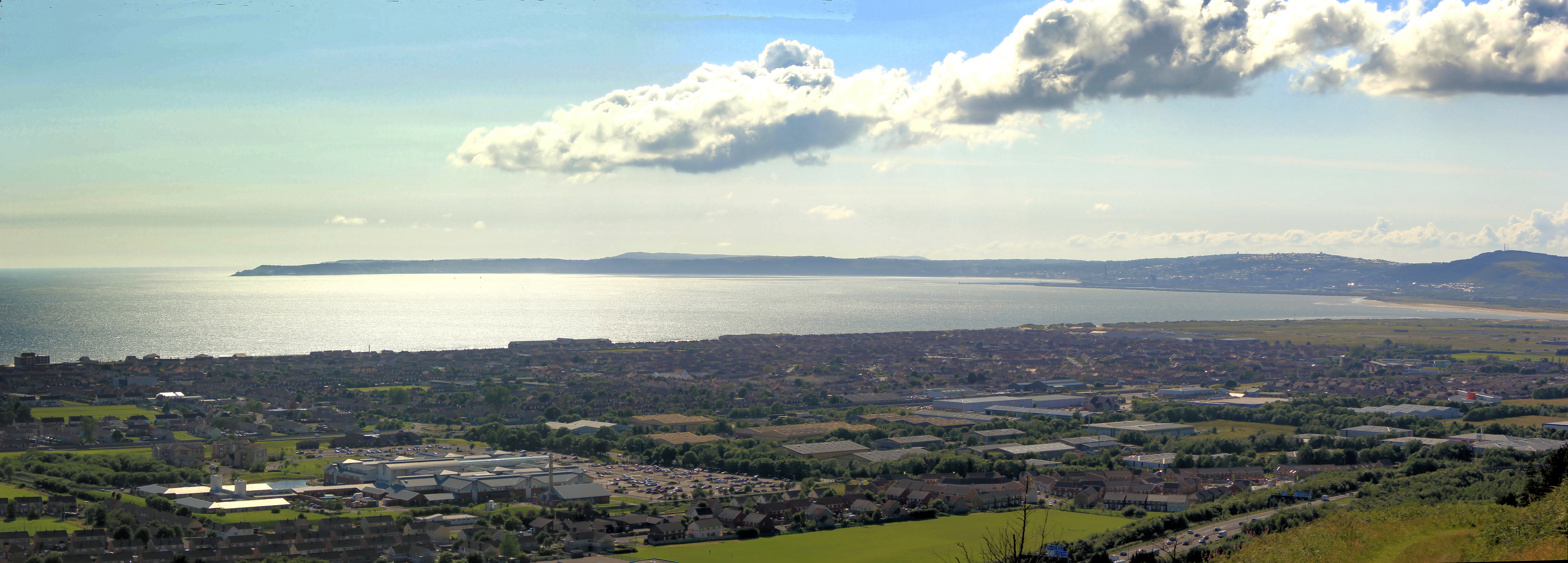
Swansea Bay as seen from Aberavon towards the Mumbles

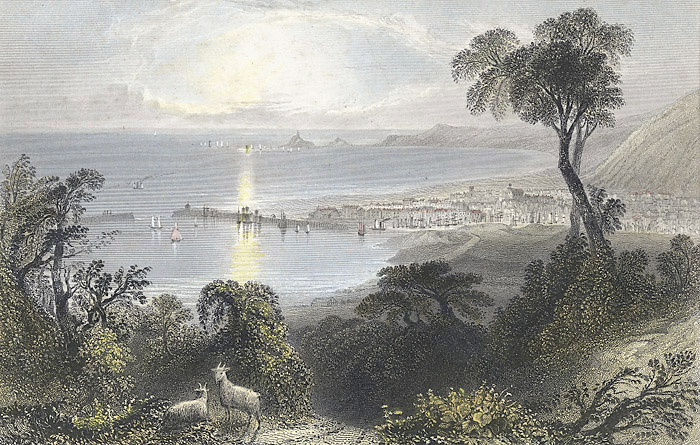
Swansea Bay (1840)

Swansea Bay (Welsh: Bae Abertawe) is a bay on the southern coast of Wales. The River Neath, River Tawe, River Afan, River Kenfig and Clyne River flow into the bay. Swansea Bay and the upper reaches of the Bristol Channel experience a large tidal range. The shipping ports in Swansea Bay are Swansea Docks, Port Talbot Docks and Briton Ferry wharves.

Each stretch of beach within the bay has its own name:

- Aberavon Beach
- Baglan Bay
- Jersey Marine Beach
- Swansea Beach
- Mumbles Beach

== Oyster trade ==
Oyster fishing was once an important industry in Swansea Bay, employing 600 people at its height in the 1860s. However, overfishing, disease and pollution had all but wiped out the oyster population by 1920. In 2005, plans were announced to reintroduce the Oyster farming industry.

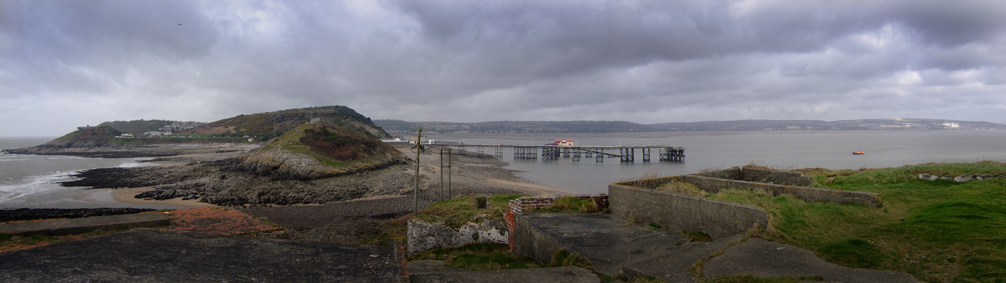
Bracelet bay, Mumbles and Swansea bay, seen from the Mumbles Lighthouse

== Pollution ==
For the last two decades of the 20th century, the bay was blighted by pollution, partly from the surrounding heavy industry and partly from sewerage outlets being sited at inappropriate locations including the main one that was located just seaward of Mumbles Lighthouse. A pumping station inside the cliff adjacent to Knab Rock brought all of Swansea city's effluent in a raw form to this point. Adding to the problem was the natural current flow of the waters in the Bay which often did not move the polluted waters further out to sea. Ironically, the outgoing tide did not carry the raw sewage down the adjacent Bristol Channel, but instead cause it to be sucked in around the circumference of the Bay and only then out down the Channel. If not fully discharged on that tide, the incoming tide would then push the same effluent up the Channel, and once again circulate around the Bay. Efforts were made by the local authority to reduce the pollution in the Bay but care had to be taken to ensure the pollution did not move to the popular beach resorts in south Gower instead.

This original sewer outlet was finally made inactive in around 1996 following the construction of a pipeline which ran all the way back around the Bay following the line of the former Mumbles Railway as far as Beach Street, along the sea-side of the Maritime Quarter and through Swansea Docks to a new £90 million sewage treatment plant at Crymlyn Burrows near Port Tennant. From here a new outlet was made, extending further out to sea. As a consequence of the improvement these works have made, it is hoped that Swansea Bay will achieve Blue Flag Beach status. Aberavon beach was awarded Blue Flag status in December 2007.

== Power generation ==
=== Fossil ===
There is a GE-built gas-fired power station just inland at Baglan Bay. A second gas-fired power station, the "Abernedd Power Station" at Port Talbot, was approved for construction in 2011.

=== Biomass plans ===
A new biomass power station was approved in 2014 for construction near the coast at Port Talbot.

=== Tidal plans ===
Swansea Bay (along with the rest of the Bristol Channel) has one of the highest tidal ranges in the world. This offers a potential for electricity generation using tidal lagoons. Around 2015, a proposal was made by Tidal Lagoon Swansea Bay Ltd for a tidal lagoon. The tidal lagoon would be sited just south of the Queen's Dock between River Tawe and River Neath estuaries. This project was controversial, partly due to the amount of subsidy required to make the project viable and also because of the potential damage to an AONB and MCZ in Cornwall where Tidal Lagoon Swansea Bay sought to re-open a disused quarry at Dean Point from which to source the rock for the lagoon.

=== Wind plans ===
Construction of an offshore windfarm in the Bay was approved in 2004, but construction was deferred owing to the costs involved. The windfarm was to have been sited at Scarweather Sands, about 5 km (3 mi) off the coast and visible from Porthcawl.
