= List of food festivals in the United Kingdom =

This is a list of food festivals in the United Kingdom. As a criterion, established festivals should all have a devoted website to which they are linked. Some of the food festivals are alternatively entitled Show, Fayre, Fair, Fest, Feast.

== A ==
- Abergavenny Christmas Food & Drink Fair
- Abergavenny Food Festival
- Aberystwyth Sea2shore Food Festival
- Alcester & Forest of Arden Food Festival
- Alresford Watercress Festival
- Anglesey Oyster & Welsh Produce Festival
- Annual Whitstable Oyster Fair

== B ==
- Barnes Food Fair
- BBC Good Food Show Scotland
- BBC Summer Good Food Show
- Beaumaris Food Festival
- Big Cheese Festival, Caerphilly
- Big Welsh Bite, Rhondda Heritage Park
- Bishop Auckland Food Festival
- Bite Food Festival, Cardiff
- Black Cherry Fair
- Blossomtime
- Brecon Beacons Food Festival
- Bridport Food Festival
- Brighton & Hove Food and Drink Festival
- British Food Fortnight, Across Britain
- Broneirion Food Fair, Llandinam
- Big Onion Food and Music Festival
- Bolton Food and Drink Festival
- Beaumaris Food Festivali

== C ==
- Caernarfon Food Festival
- Caerphilly Food Festival
- Cardiff International Food and Drink Festival
- Cardigan Bay Seafood Festival
- Cardigan River and Food Festival
- Cheltenham Food & Drink Festival
- Cherry and Soft Fruit Show
- Chester Food, Drink and Lifestyle Festival
- Chilli Fest
- Clovelly Herring Festival
- Cowbridge Food and Drink Festival
- Gwledd Conwy Feast
- Cornwall Food & Drink Festival
- Clitheroe Food Festival

== D ==
- Dales Festival of Food & Drink
- Dartmouth Food Festival
- Derbyshire Food Festival
- Devizes Food & Drink Festival
- Dorset Seafood Festival
- Durham City Food Festival
- Dorney Court Kitchen Garden, Eaton Dorney, Windsor
- Dorlish food festival

== E ==
- East Midlands Food & Drink Festival
- Eat Cambridge
- EAT! Newcastle Gateshead
- Elmbridge Food Festival
- English Wine Week

== F ==
- The Food & Drink Festival Online
- Feastival, Bridgend
- Feast 2018 at Waddesdon Manor
- Feast on the Bridge
- Fishstock Brixham
- Flavour Fest
- Flavour Of Shetland
- Flavours of Summer
- Foodies Festival

== G ==
- Gloucester Food Festival
- Gorseinon-Swansea Food Festival
- Great British Cheese Festival
- Guildford Food festival
- Gwledd Conwy Feast
- Gwyl Fwyd a Chrefft Portmeirion

== H ==
- Haverfordwest Beer and Cider Festival
- Hay Summer Food Festival
- Hay Winter Food Festival
- Henley Food Festival

== K ==
- Kendal Festival of Food

== L ==
- Lampeter Food Festival
- Lancashire Food Festival
- Leeds Loves Food
- Leicester's Summer Food and Drink Festival
- Leicester's Winter Food Festival Featuring Christmas Crafts
- Liverpool Food & Drink Festival
- Llangollen Food Festival
- Loch Lomond Food & Drink Festival
- Ludlow Food Festival
- Lancaster Food and Drink Festival

== M ==
- Mold Food & Drink Festival
- Mortimer Country Food Fair
- Malton Food Lovers Festival
- Monmouthshire Food Festival
- Mumbles Oyster Festival

== N ==
- Narberth Food Festival
- Nantwich Food Festival
- Nantwich International Cheese Show
- Neath Food and Drink Festival
- Newbury Food Festival
- Newcastle Emlyn Food Festival
- Newport Food Festival
- Newtown Food & Drink Festival

== P ==
- Pembrokeshire Fish Week
- Pershore Plum Festival
- Portmeirion Food and Craft Festival
- Rye Bay Scallop Week
- Porthleven Food Festival
- Poole Seafood Festival (2021 to 2022)

== R ==
- Richmond Fine Food and Beer festival

== S ==
- Scottish Food Fortnight
- Stratford Food Festival
- Spice Food Festival
- St Davids Really Wild Food & Countryside Festival
- St Fagans Food Festival
- St Ives Food & Drink Festival

== T ==
- Taste Festivals
- Tastes of Lincolnshire Christmas Food and Drink Fair
- Tavistock Food and Drink Festival
- The British Asparagus Festival
- The Egton Bridge Gooseberry Show
- The Isle of Man Food & Drink Festival
- The Isle of Wight Garlic Festival
- The National Forest Food & Drink Fair
- The Really Wild Food and Countryside Festival
- The South of England Food and Drink Festival
- The World's Original Marmalade Festival
- Truro Food Festival

== U ==
- Upton Food and Drink Festival

== W ==
- The Welsh Menu Live
- Welsh Perry and Cider Festival
- Weston super Food Festival (Weston-super-Mare)
- West Wales Food Festival
- Wimborne Food Festival
- Wrexham Food Festival

== Y ==
- York Food Festival
- Yorkshire Dales Food and Drink Festival

== See also ==
- List of food festivals in Wales
