= List of food festivals in Wales =

This is a list of food festivals in Wales. As a criterion, established festivals should all have a devoted website to which they are linked. Some of the food festivals are alternatively entitled Show, Fayre, Fair, Fest, Feast.

== A ==
- Abergavenny Christmas Food & Drink Fair
- Abergavenny Food Festival
- Aberystwyth Sea2shore Food Festival
- Anglesey Oyster & Welsh Produce Festival

== B ==
- Big Cheese Festival, Caerphilly
- The Big Welsh Bite Food Festival
- Bite Food Festival, Cardiff
- Brecon Beacons Food Festival
- Broneirion Food Fair, Llandinam
- Beaumaris Food Festival

== C ==
- Caernarfon Food Festival
- Caerphilly Food Festival
- Cardiff International Food and Drink Festival
- Cardigan Bay Seafood Festival
- Cardigan River and Food Festival
- Taste of Carmarthenshire Food Festival
- Cowbridge Food and Drink Festival
- Crymych Food Festival

== D ==
- Denbigh Plum Festival
- Dinefwr Food Festival

== E ==
- Erddig Apple Festival

== F ==
- Feastival, Bridgend

== G ==
- Gorseinon Food Festival
- Gwledd Conwy Feast

== H ==
- Haverfordwest Beer and Cider Festival
- Hay Summer Food Festival
- Hay Winter Food Festival

== L ==
- Lampeter Food Festival
- Llanelli Food and Drink Festival
- Llangollen Food Festival

== M ==
- Menai Food Festival
- Merthyr Food Festival
- Mold Food & Drink Festival
- Monmouthshire Food Festival
- Mumbles Oyster and Food Festival

== N ==
- Narberth Food Festival
- Neath Food and Drink Festival
- Newcastle Emlyn Food Festival
- Newport Food Festival
- Newtown Food & Drink Festival

== P ==
- Pembrokeshire Fish Week
- Portmeirion Food and Craft Festival

== R ==
- Rhuddlan Food Festival

== S ==
- St Davids Really Wild Food & Countryside Festival
- St David's Food Festival, Pembrey
- St Fagans Food Festival

== W ==
- The Welsh Menu Live
- Welsh Perry and Cider Festival
- Wrexham Food Festival
