= List of festivals in Wales =

This is a list of festivals in Wales – festivals that occur (or have occurred) regularly in Wales, a constituent country of the European country of the United Kingdom.

== List of festivals ==
(organised by month, including location)

=== February ===
- Dydd Miwsig Cymru

=== March ===
- Laugharne Weekend (Laugharne)

=== April ===
- Wales International Harp Festival (Caernarfon)
- Machynlleth Comedy Festival (Machynlleth)
- Lost Cove Surf Festival (St Davids)

=== May ===
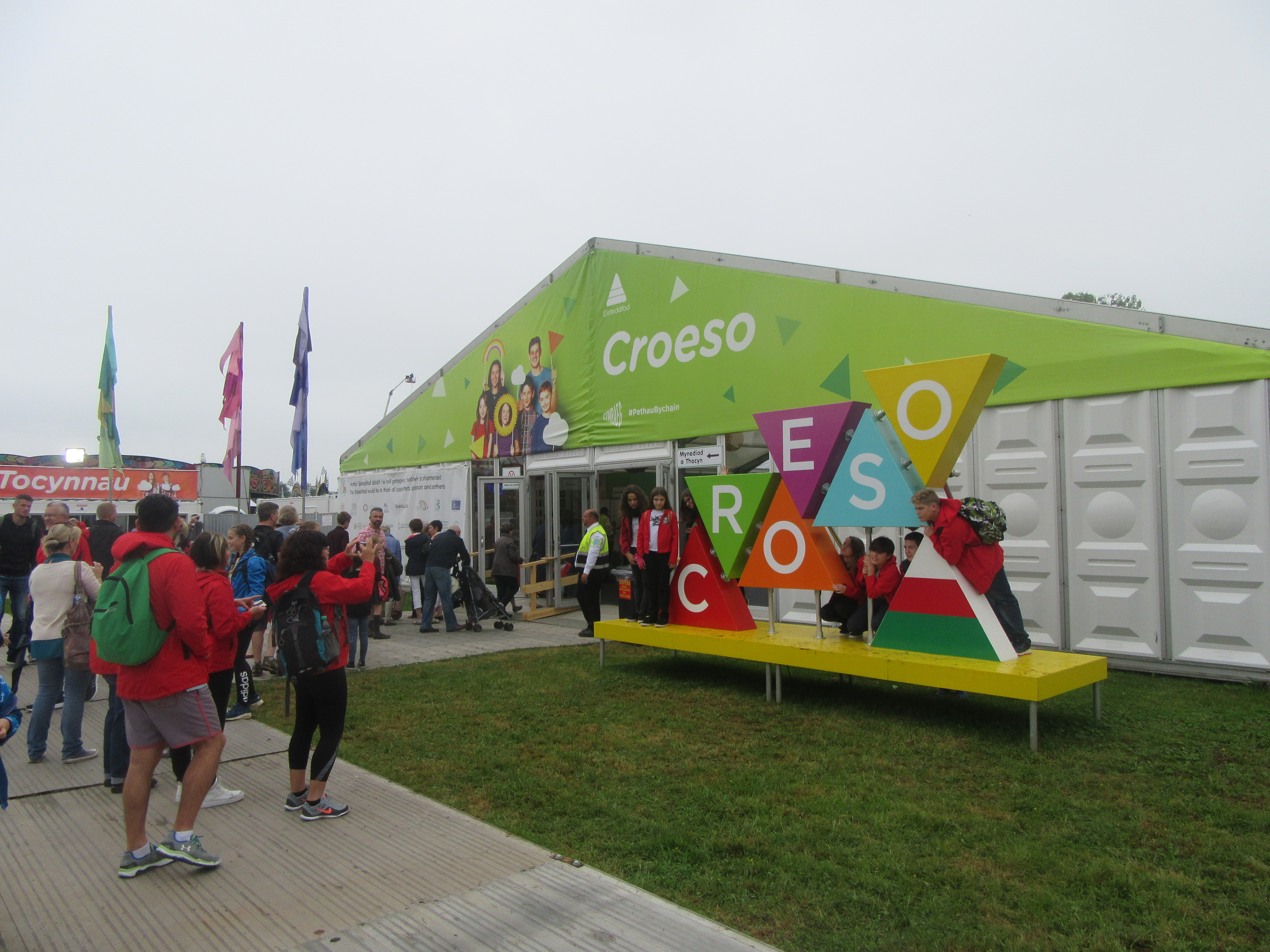
- Urdd National Eisteddfod 2017 Entrance
  Hay festival (Hay-on-Wye)
- Urdd National Eisteddfod (location changes)
- Inside Out festival (Bute Park, Cardiff)
- FOCUS Wales (Wrexham)
- Gwyl Fach y Fro (Barry Island)
- Balter Festival (Chepstow)
- In it Together Festival (Margam, Port Talbot)

=== June ===
- Secret Valley Fest (Abergavenny)
- Tafwyl (Cardiff Castle/Bute Park)
- Gwyl Gregynog Festival (Gregynog Hall)
- Fire in the Mountain (near Abermagwr)
- Gottwood festival (Llanfaethlu)
- The Big Retreat Festival (Lawrenny)
- Unearthed Festival (Solva)

=== July ===
- The Weekend Rumble Music Festival (Usk)
- Llangollen International Musical Eisteddfod (Llangollen)
- Sesiwn Fawr Dolgellau (Dolgellau)
- Royal Welsh Show (Llanelwedd)
- Steelhouse Festival (Aberbeeg)
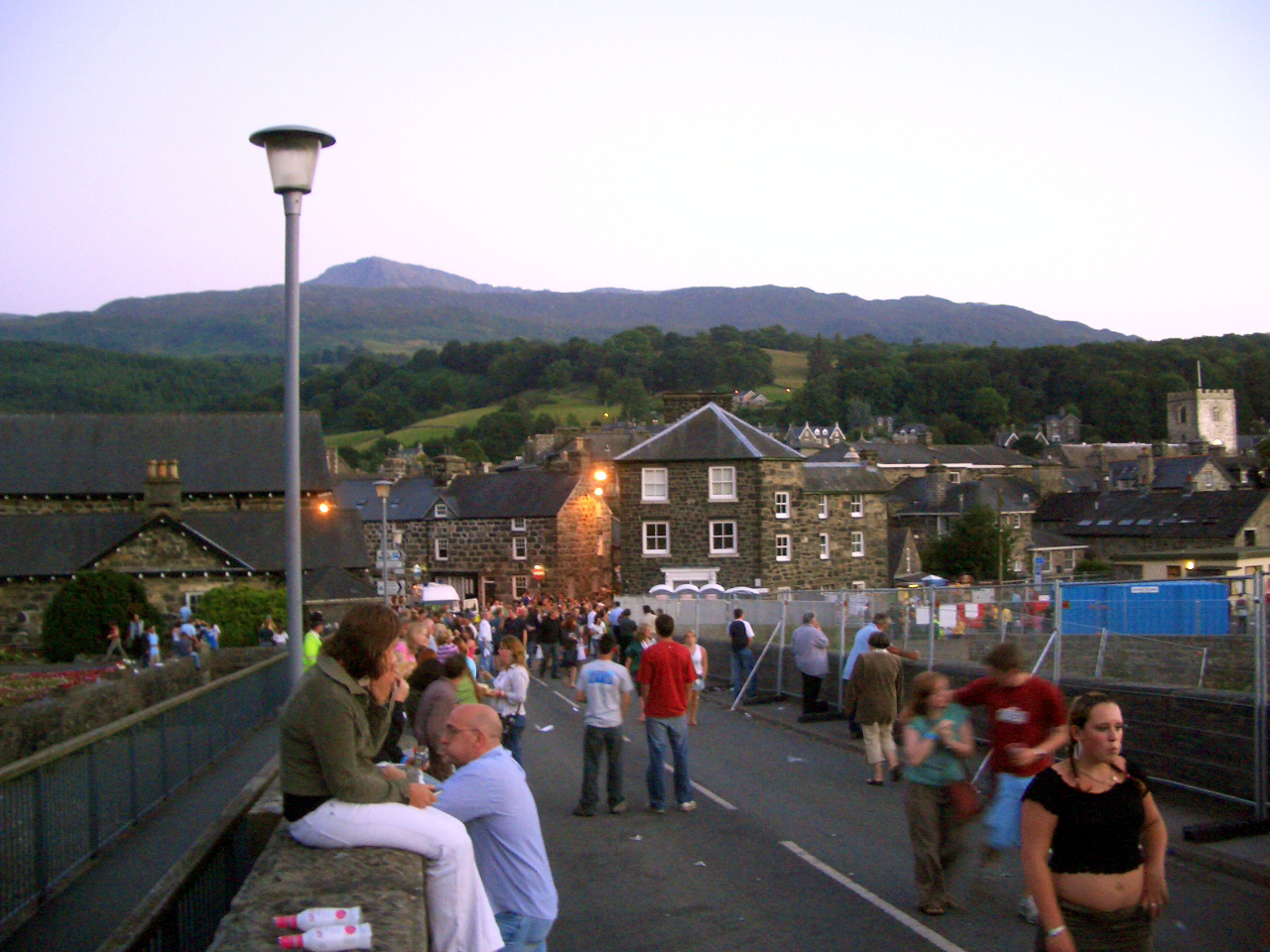
  Sesiwn Fawr Dolgellau, 2005
- Parti Ponty (Ynysangharad War Memorial Park, Pontypridd)
- The Good Life Experience festival, Summer Camp (Hawarden)
- The Gower festival (Gower Peninsula)
- Big Love festival (Trostrey)
- Westival (Manorbier)
- Landed Festival (Llanwrthwl)

=== August ===
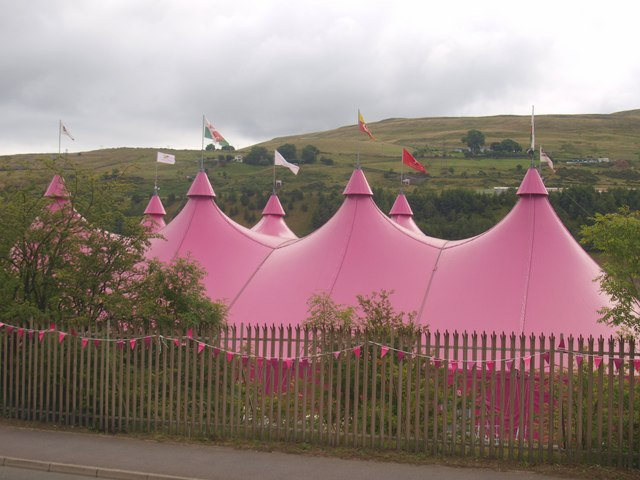
Pavilion of the National Eisteddfod of Wales

- National Eisteddfod of Wales (location changes)
- Green Man Festival (Brecon Beacons)
- Pride Cymru (Cardiff)
- Brecon Jazz Festival (Brecon)
- The Green Gathering (Chepstow)
- Truefest (Hay-on-Wye)
- Hub Festival (Cardiff)
- Between the Trees (Merthyr Mawr)

=== September ===
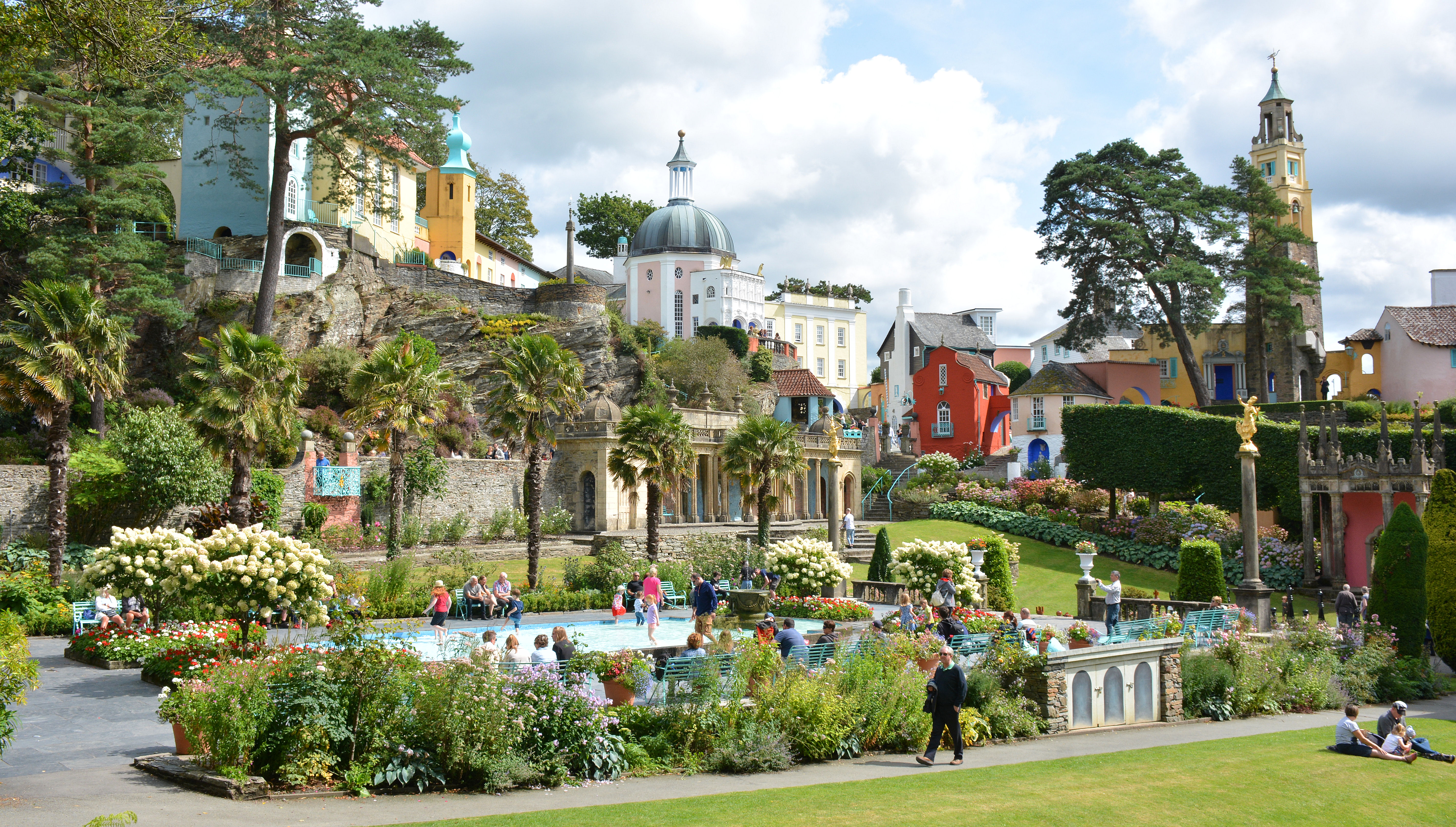
Portmeirion

- Festival N°6 (Portmeirion)
- Abergavenny Food Festival (Abergavenny)
- HowTheLightGetsIn Hay (Hay-on-Wye)
- The Good Life Experience festival, Camp Good Life, Autumn (Hawarden)
- Aberystwyth Comedy festival (Aberystwyth)
- Cowbridge Music Festival (Cowbridge)
- Gladfest (Gladstone's Library, Hawarden)
- The Big Cwtch (Crugybar)

=== October ===
- Cardiff International Film Festival (Cardiff)
- Cwlwm Celtaidd (Porthcawl)
- Swn festival (Cardiff)
- Iris Prize Festival (Cardiff)
- Other Voices Cardigan

=== November ===
- Gwyl Cerdd Dant

== See also ==
- List of food festivals in Wales
- Culture of Wales
- Music of Wales
