= Cuisine of Pembrokeshire =

Welsh regional cuisine

Pembrokeshire has been called "the cottage garden of Wales", due to its good soil and the beneficial effects of the Gulf Stream, which provide a mild climate and a longer growing season than other parts of the country. The good climate and soil meant that the south of the peninsula was coveted by the Norsemen and Normans because it had "great plentie" of corn and cattle The county has prime agricultural land, much of which is located at about 70m above sea level, while to the north, the Preseli Hills rise to 500m above sea level and form uplands that are made up of heather and bracken, which are used for grazing sheep. Consequently, Pembrokeshire is classed as one of the most fertile counties in Wales, with its 392,300 agricultural acres having 14% of its land classed as of good quality, 67% being classed as medium quality and 19% being classed as poor quality. However, agricultural production is subject to market forces and in the 1890s, as a result of the Panic of 1893, a deep agricultural depression led to the area under cultivation falling by a third. Many labourers and farmers had no option but to emigrate to the New World and many of the large farming estates were sold. World War I brought prosperity again, but by the 1930s, as a result of the Great Depression, there was another agricultural depression which lasted until World War II. During the Post-war period agriculture has benefited from marketing schemes and marketing boards, which have helped in the regulation, marketing and distribution of the county's agricultural production.

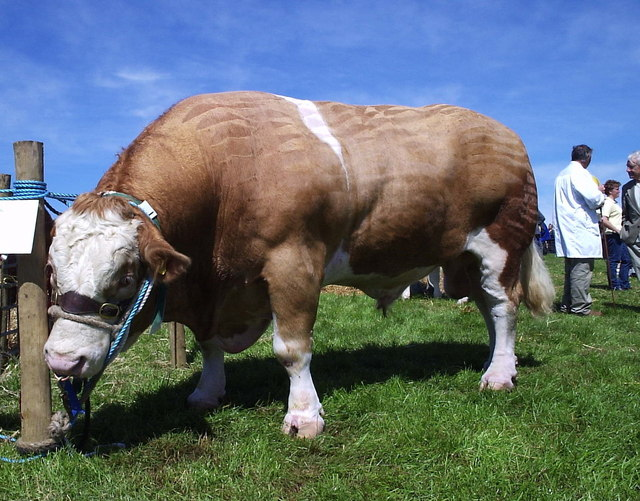
A Simmental bull waiting to be judged at the Fishguard show

Today, the county is well known for its excellent food, having capitalised on the quality of its agricultural produce. Gilli Davies notes that Fishguard is known as a mecca for the gourmet, while St Davids has developed a reputation in recent years as a centre for good food shops and Milford Haven is known for its range of local foods and delicatessen items.

== Meat and poultry ==
The Pembrokeshire coast is made up of high cliffs, large bays, small coves and estuaries backed by rolling pastures which are good for dairy farming. The interior of the county is dominated by the River Teifi and its valley of dairy and mixed farms. Sheep are kept on most farms, with the larger farms of the south of the county favouring breeds such as Clun Forest sheep, Suffolk sheep and Cheviot sheep, while in the north, the farms of the Preseli Hills are stocked with Welsh Mountain sheep

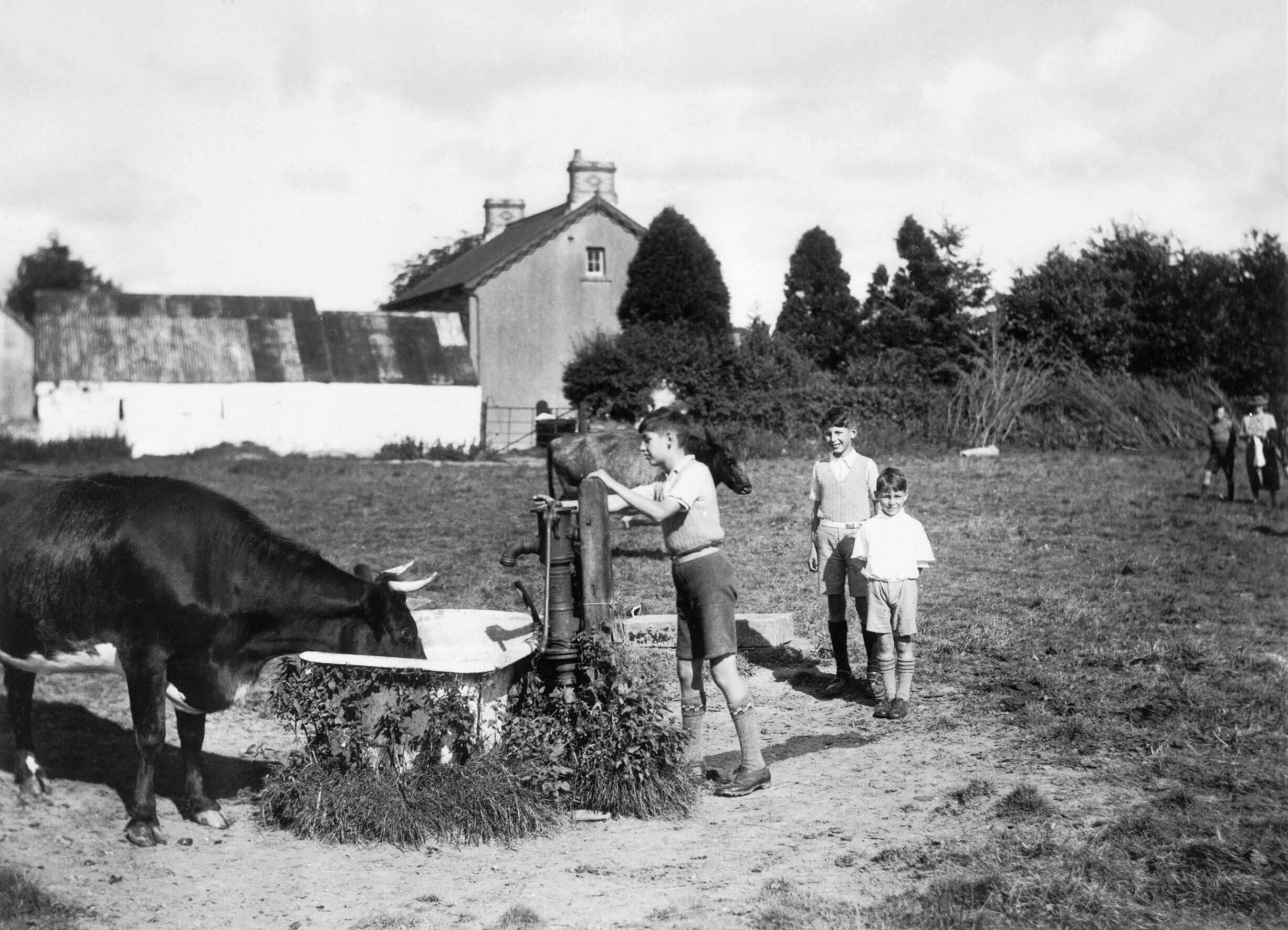
Boys evacuated from London help to feed the cattle on a farm in Pembrokeshire, 1940

Pembrokeshire also produces beef from breeds such as Welsh Black cattle, a native cattle breed. This breed has developed, in part, from the extinct breed known as Pembroke cattle. Gilli Davies notes that, in Pembrokeshire, the Welsh Black cattle grow to a large size and are good milk producers, due to the county's rich pasture. This led to Welsh Black cattle in Pembrokeshire being recognised as a distinct race and the Welsh Black of Castlemartin, Pembrokeshire now have their own herd book. By the nineteenth century the breed had developed into two distinct strains: the smaller the North Wales variety and the bigger Castlemartin, or South Wales, type. However, R. M. Lockley noted that, by the twentieth century, the long horns and dual purpose nature of the Welsh Black made it less popular. Farm specialisation meant that the breed was substituted for specialised beef or milk breeds. Hereford (cattle) became popular for beef production while Friesian cattle were used for milk production. However, the Welsh Black has since made a comeback and is regaining in popularity, with Welsh Black meat now sold across the county at retail outlets and farm shops.

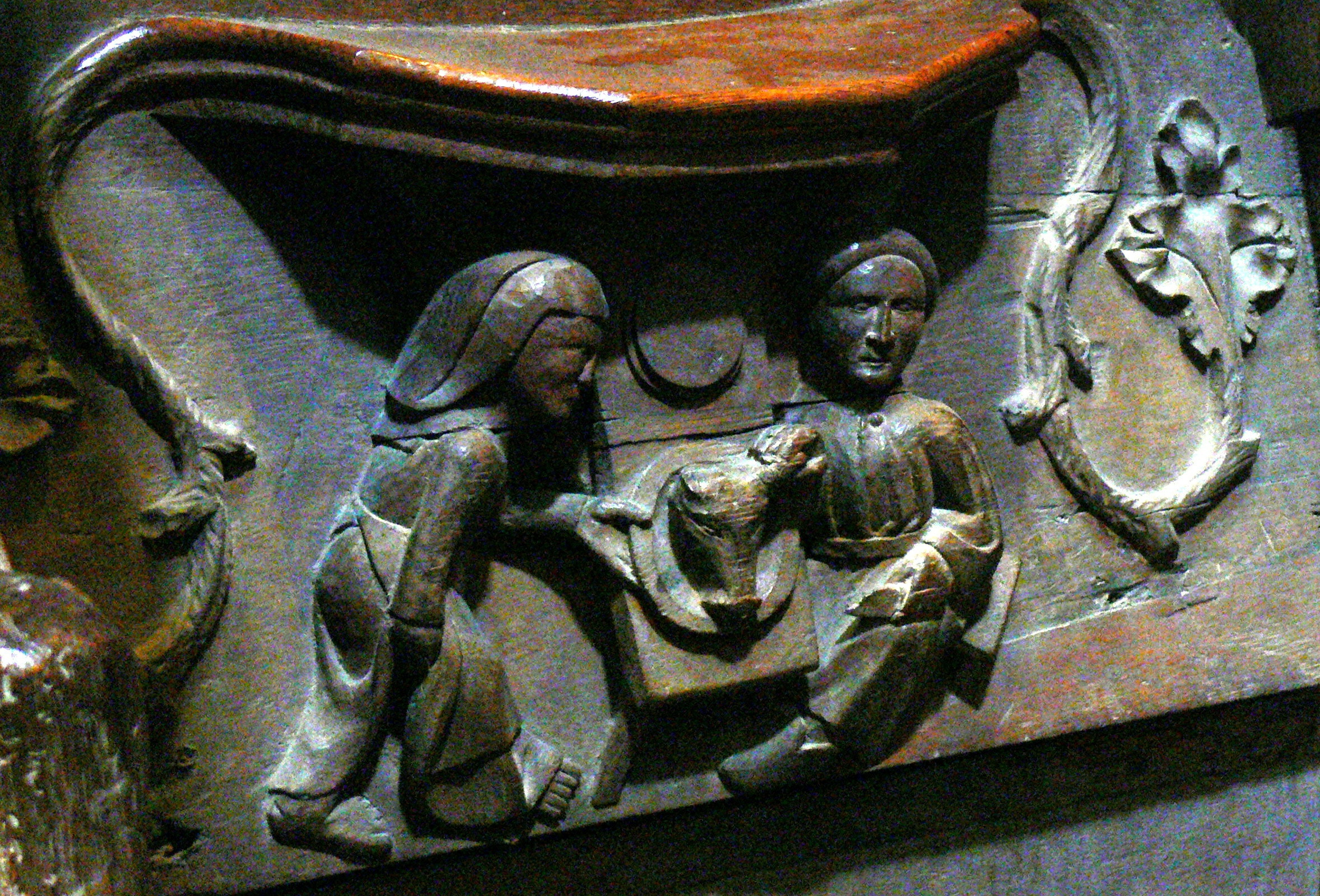
A Misericord in St Davids Cathedral depicting a merchant receiving a meal of a pig's head, served by a female servant.

Colin Pressdee notes that Pembrokeshire is also known for its poultry, with the Pembrokeshire turkey having become as well known as Aylesbury duck. Geese were also commonly kept, with the county once having a reputation for its Michaelmas Geese, which were also known as Green Geese. These were once to be found on every farm, village green and piece of common land in the county. Poultry, including hens, and turkeys continue to provide an important side-line to Pembrokeshire farming, especially on the medium and smaller farms

== Fish ==
The coastline of Pembrokeshire has an extensive wild fishery with small fishing fleets traditionally operating out of Fishguard, St Davids, Solva, Tenby and Milford Haven. The larger fishing trawlers operate from Milford Haven, which was recognised by Lord Nelson as "one of the greatest natural harbours in the world". In 1890, there were 1,660 fishing vessels using Milford Haven's docks and it became one of Britain's most successful fishing ports. However, Milford Haven became less busy after World War II, although in 1950 its trawlers still landed about 5-6% of the UK's wet fish (chiefly European hake) and had the UK's fifth largest fleet. Milford Haven now acts mainly as a base for foreign-registered trawlers which export most of their catch to continental markets. The trawlers and small fishing craft bring prosperity to Milford Haven and exploit the hake-fishery of the west coast and south-west of Ireland, with herring being landed in season. Prime fish landed at the port includes common sole, turbot, plaice, monkfish and European seabass, which fetch high prices. The smaller trawlers catch crab, lobster, crayfish, herring, whiting (merlangius), pollock and salmon, or line fish for mackerel. The old fish market at Milford Haven docks has closed but a smaller, trade only, market has opened instead. Milford Haven also has a marina and restaurants.

Fishguard harbour is the ferry port for Ireland and is a commercial centre, but according to Pressdee the wild coast from St Davids to St Brides Bay houses the best secrets of the entire coastline. He considers North Pembrokeshire to be more rugged and beautiful than the south. It also has a number of fishing ports which once exported stone from the limestone and slate quarries of the area. These ports, such as Porthgain, Abereiddy, Pen Clegyr and Tresinwen now have small fleets of working craft and pleasure boats. They serve local pubs and restaurants that produce fresh seafood and farm produce and which vary with the season and tides. Pressdee cites The Harbour Lights Restaurant at Porthgain, Jemima's near Haverfordwest and Tates in Fishguard as popular examples of such places.

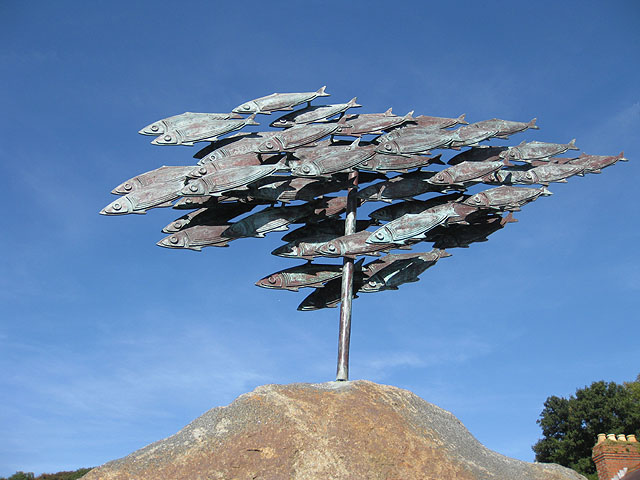
Sculpture of herrings, overlooking Fishguard harbour, and erected in recognition of the harbour's fishing and trading history, the sculpture is by John Cleal and was erected in 2006 (photo by Pauline Eccles).

The winter herring industry gives large landings of fish, especially around the estuary of the River Cleddau at Llangwm, Pembrokeshire. This was once an important component of the county's inshore fishery, with the catch being made into kippers and bloater (herring) at Milford Haven's fish docks. At Llangwm the inhabitants formerly lived exclusively by fishing cockle (bivalve)s, oysters, mussels and clams collected at low tide from the Llangwm boats, which were the modern equivalent of the British osier or coracle.

Oysters are an important shellfish crop and the principal oyster beds were found at Penna Mouth, Lawrenny, Llangwm and Milford Haven. They were once delivered by packhorse throughout South Wales. Farmed rock oysters, a Pacific species, have been used to re-stock some oyster beds, although native oysters are making a comeback around Carew, Pembrokeshire and Benton Castle at Milford Haven. However, the shellfish industry has disappeared from around the Llangwm part of the coast.

Seabirds were once taken for food and, because they came from the sea and lived on fish, they were regarded as fish for religious purposes, when meat was required to be replaced with fish in the diet.

== Fruit and vegetables ==
The English built their castles across Pembrokeshire to defend the south of the county from the Welsh to the north. The boundary that developed, known as the Landsker Line, follows the January isotherm (contour line) of 0 °C (32 °F). Below this line the milder winters promote the growth of winter crops. This means that farmers can grow new grass earlier in the year than other parts of the county. It also means that early new potatoes can become an important cash crop, subject to competition from earlier crops of potatoes imported from the Mediterranean and elsewhere.

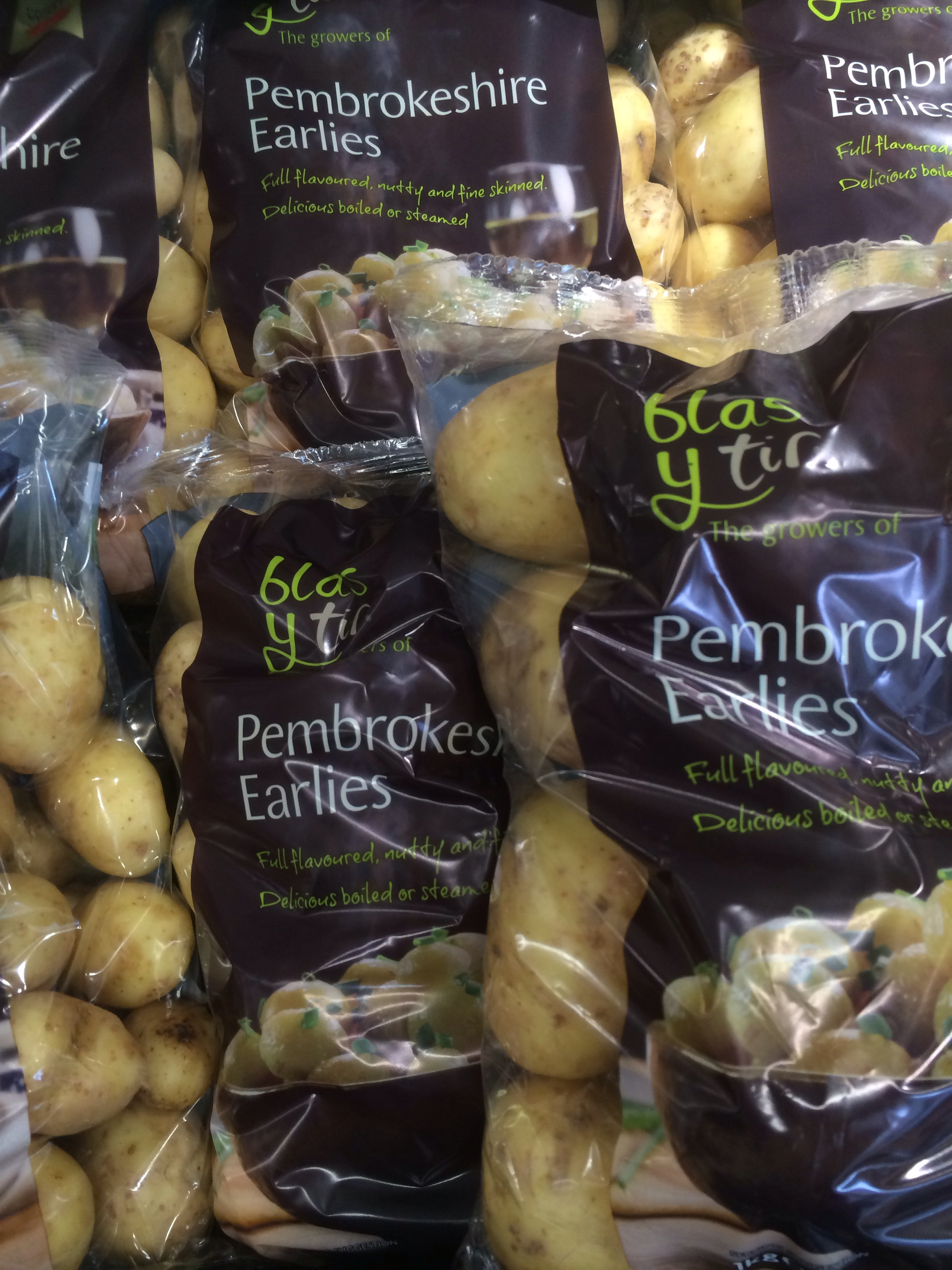
Pembrokeshire early potatoes in plastic bags produced by Blas y Tir

The main crops are early potatoes, winter brassicas and root vegetables with the harvesting period being between end of October and mid-May. South Pembrokeshire is known for its root vegetables and Pressdee notes that, until recently, there were not many recipes using them, although dishes such as creamed swede have since become popular. Other Pembrokeshire crops include cauliflower, asparagus and soft fruit Cauliflowers require a frost free climate when the curd is developing and the mild climate of Pembrokeshire means that it is an important local crop, with the county supplying this vegetable to national markets.

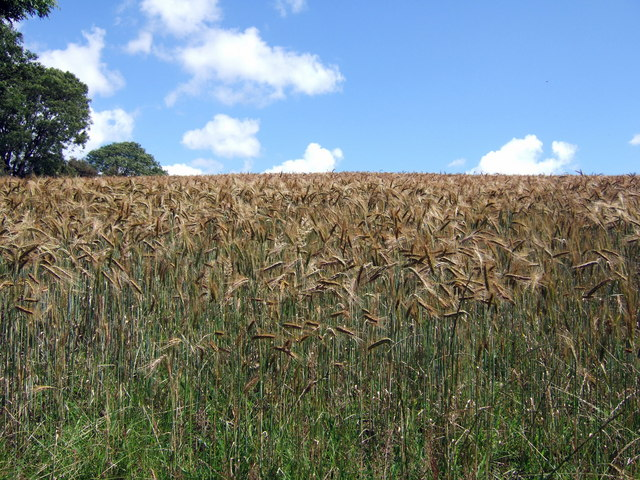
Barley field. Barley growing below Castell Mawr Hillfort, Pembrokeshire

Central Pembrokeshire, from the River Cleddau estuary to the west coast, grows cereals for cattle, while most coastal farms are laid down to 50% arable land and with 40% under short ley farming, with 10% permanent pasture close to the farm. The arable rotation often included early potatoes, in the first and second years, sometimes with sugar beet or broccoli in the same year, when the potatoes are taken out in June, then three corn crops, the last under sown with a three-years ley, the sequence may be varied, depending on the price of early potatoes, broccoli and sugar beet. Oats are the most popular crop, followed by early potatoes, barley for seed, wheat and sugar beet.

Pembrokeshire has also produced a number of varieties of Welsh apples, including Pren Glas and Pig Aderyn. These two varieties are from St Dogmaels. Pren Glas is an early season eating apple, while Pig Aderyn is a mid-season eating apple with scarlet stripes and a top that resembles a bird's beak (pig aderyn). Two other Pembrokeshire varieties include Wern and Pigeon's Beak. Wern is an early dessert apple variety of nineteenth century origin which is good for eating and cooking. Pigeon's Beak (Pig y golomen) is said to originate from Pembrokeshire but is also found in Denbigh and Anglesey. Other apple and fruit varieties may exist and await rediscovery.

== Milk, cheese and ice cream ==
After World War I, when corn prices collapsed due to the depression, many farms moved into milk production in order to benefit from the guaranteed prices offered by the Milk Marketing Board. This suited the sheltered inland valley farms, with high rainfall, which are well suited to grass production. This led to many small farms producing milk and reducing their arable acreage. However, over-production led to the introduction of milk quotas, which had a positive side-effect, in that it led to a growth in specialist and small scale artisan cheese making in Pembrokeshire.

Calon Wen (which means White Heart) is a Welsh co-operative of dairy farmers who established themselves in order to sell milk to local people and comprises 20 members in north and south-west Wales and is based in Narberth, Pembrokeshire. They produce organic milk and have been working with the Bumblebee Conservation Trust to see how organic dairy farms can be managed for bumblebees.

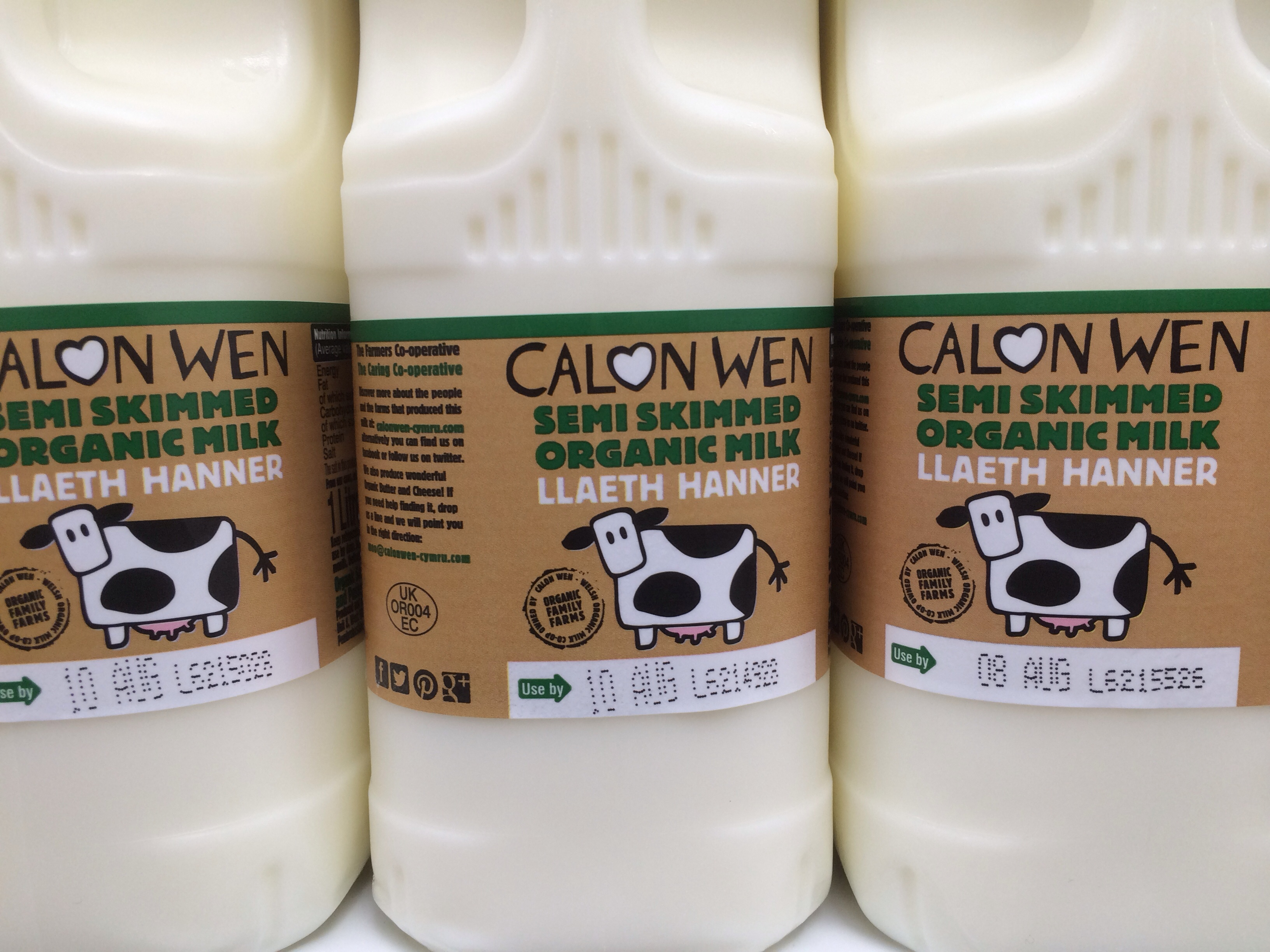
Bottles of Calon Wen semi-skimmed milk

Caws Cenarth is a cheese made at Pontseli near Boncath since 1984, the cheese is sold locally and at Selfridges and has been listed by Harrods as a Top Ten British Cheese. Llangloffan Farmhouse Cheese was produced on a smallholding near Llangloffan by Leon Downey and his wife Joan. He was a former principal viola player with The Hallé. Downey retired in 2006 and his Llangloffan cheese is now made by the Carmarthenshire Cheese Company. Pant Mawr Farmhouse Cheeses, based at Clynderwen, in the Preseli Hills, offers hand-made award-winning cheeses, including Caws Cerwyn, a mellow short-matured cheese, Mature Cerwyn, which is full-bodied, Oak Smoked Cerwyn, which is a traditionally smoked cheese, Caws Preseli, with a distinctive taste, and Dewi Sant, with a tangy yeasty taste. Their Caws-y-Graig cheese is a goat's cheese with a robust flavour.

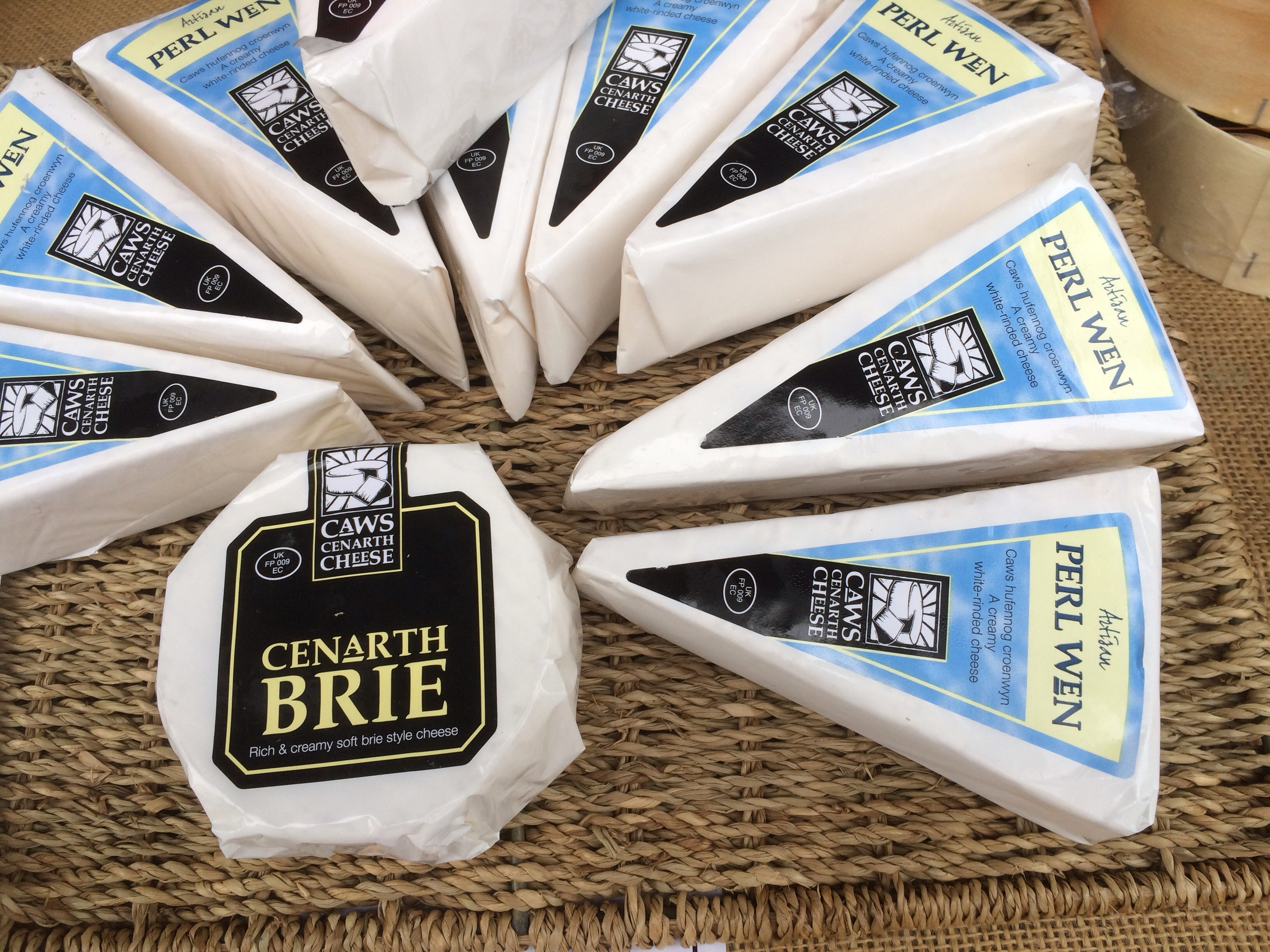
Pearl Wen Brie from Caws Cenarth Cheese

The county's high quality milk means that Pembrokeshire also produces good quality ice cream, Mary's Farmhouse Ices, at Crymych, has been producing ice cream, using fresh fruit and locally sourced ingredients without condensed or synthetic flavours, since 1984. Gianni's, at St Davids, is an Italian ice cream made by a husband and wife team. They offer "100s of flavours", with salted caramel being a best seller. They also have a range of dog-friendly ice creams. Fire and Ice, based in Narberth, uses organic milk and cream from Calon Wen and Daioni, with their chocolate and hazelnut varieties of ice cream being popular. They also produce an award-winning dairy-free mango sorbet. Cowpots Ice Cream, of Whitland, is made on the farm from a herd of pedigree Jersey cows, with the ice cream parlour being open Tuesdays to Sundays from 9.30am to 6pm. Upton Farm sells ice cream through local cafes throughout the county.

== Bread and cakes ==
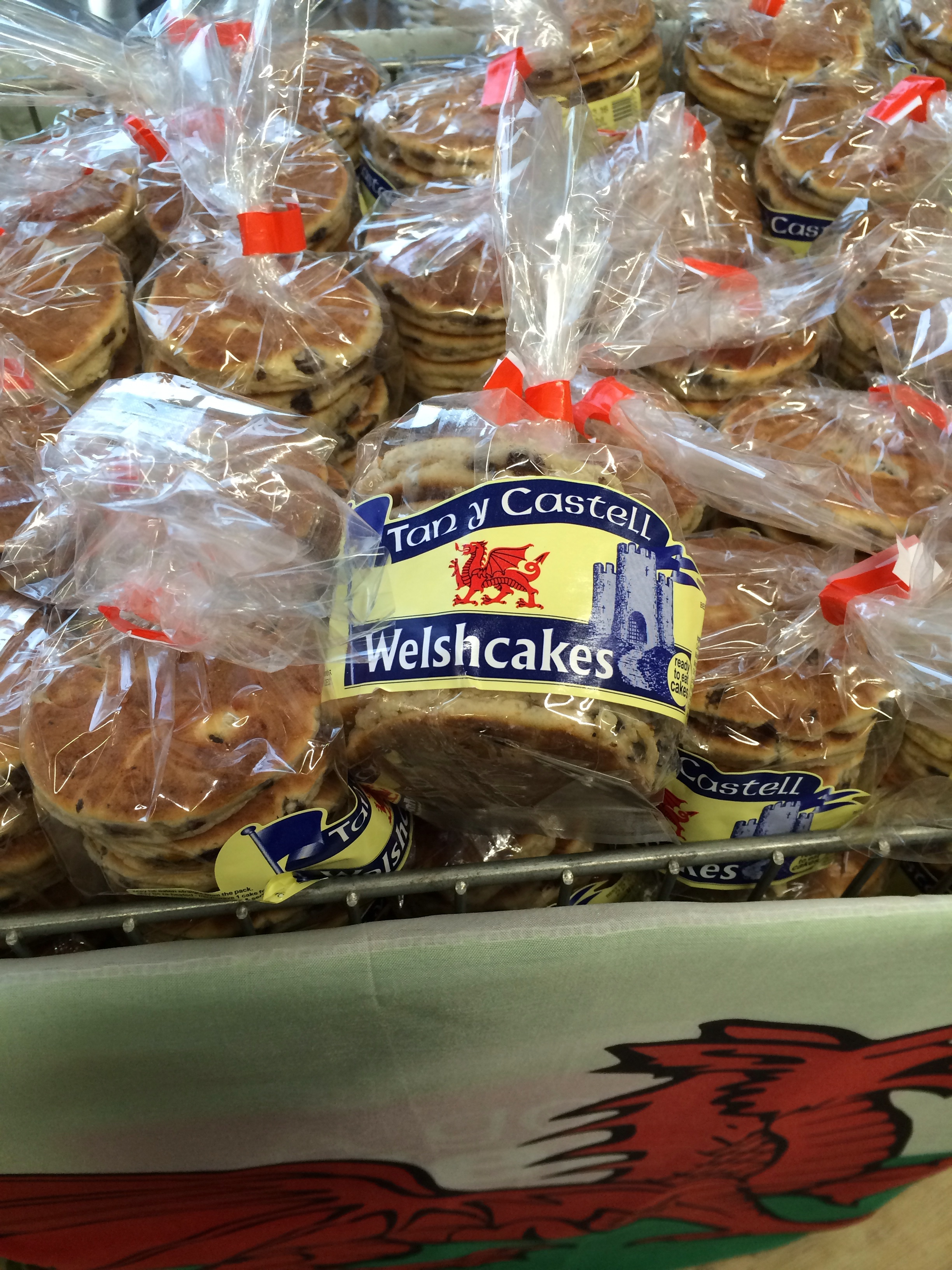
Welsh cakes produced by Tan y Castell

Y Felin Mill, at St Dogmaels, dates back to the twelfth century and is one of only two working mills in Wales. It is an overshot mill producing bread and cakes and has the only working kiln for roasting oats remaining in Wales. It still uses original machinery from 1820, produces organic flour and offers guided tours. For three generations, White's Golden Crust Bakery was based at Lamphey and produced hand-made bread, until the demise of Ian White in 2019.

== Preserves and delicatessens ==
Wendy Brandon, based at an old water mill called Felin Wen, at Boncath, makes nearly 200 different jams, jellies, marmalades, chutneys, vinegars and dressings. It is possible to see the kitchen at work, visit the shop and taste the produce. Four Seasons, at Bethesda Cross, Saundersfoot, is a delicatessen, fruiterer and florist, using locally sourced produce wherever available, and sells cheeses, ham, meats and oils. Nervous Nigel produces a range of hand-made relishes, sauces and marinades which range from sweet to hot and are sold at outlets throughout Pembrokeshire.

== Drinks ==
Pembrokeshire has a number of local breweries, Bluestone Brewing Company is a family brewery based in the Preseli Hills, while Caffle Brewery is a microbrewery established in an old school building at Llawhaden, in Cwm Gwaun. Nearby is the Gwaun Valley Brewery, established in 2009 in an old granary at Kiliffeth, near the Preseli Hills. It uses natural spring water and has space for functions and music sessions, which are held there every Saturday night.

Seren Brewery is another microbrewery based near the Preseli Hills and was established in June 2013. The brewery won "Beer of the Festival" at the Campaign for Real Ale's (CAMRA) Pembrokeshire Beer Festival and a silver medal in the Dublin Craft Beer Cup for its Bluestone IPA. It is located in the old Syfynwy Woolen Mill, now known as "The Factory", close to the Syfni river, with water for the brewery being drawn from the reservoir at Rosebush, Pembrokeshire.

Tenby has two breweries, including The Tenby Brewing Company, a microbrewery which aims to leave as little impact on the environment as possible, and the Tenby Harbour Brewery; located in Sergeant's Lane, Tenby, which links the town square to Tenby Harbour. This beer is available at the Buccaneer Inn and the Hope & Anchor Inn in Tenby and in local restaurants. Other breweries include The Pembrokeshire Brewing Company.

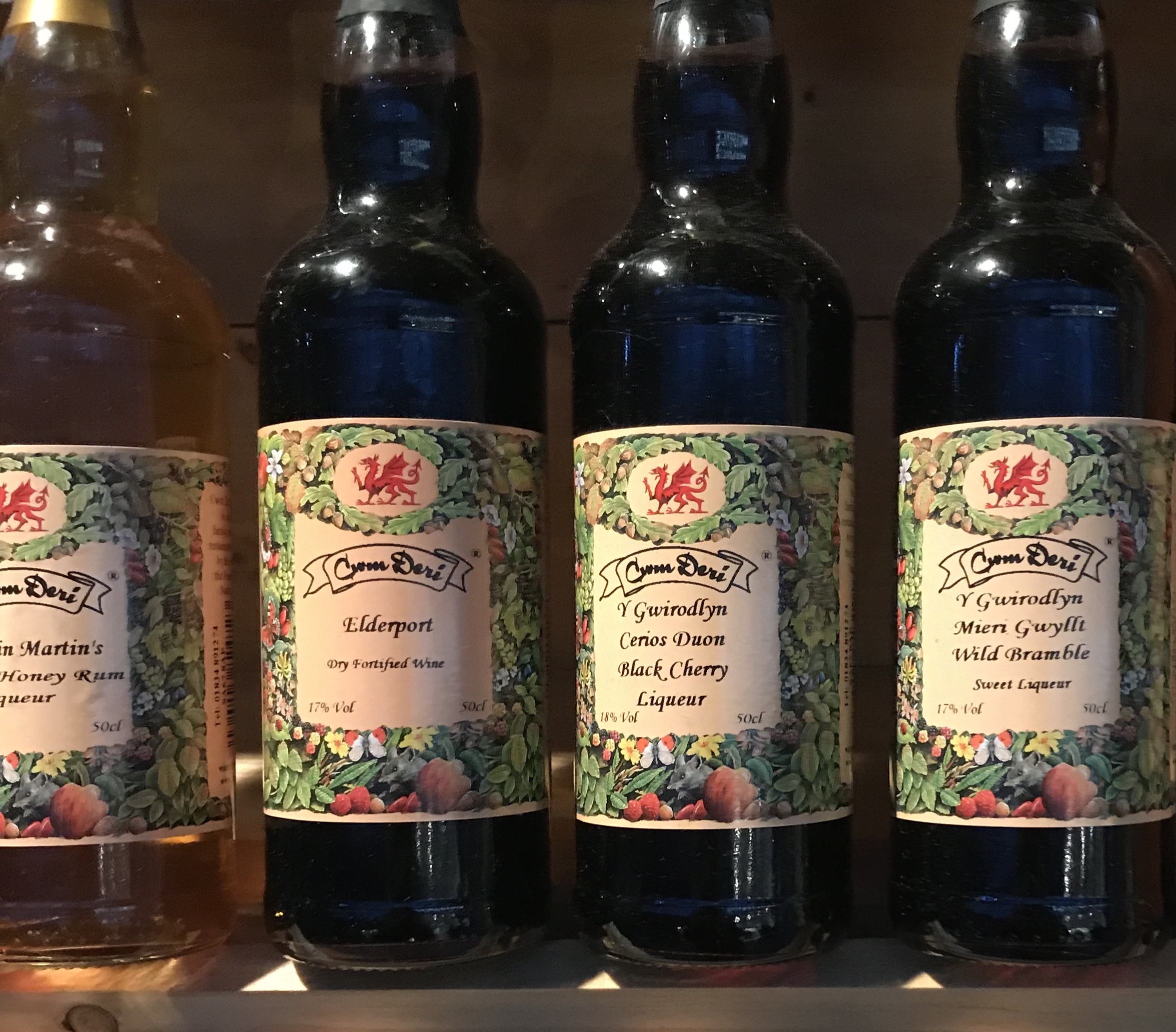
Cwm Deri liqueurs

Cwm Deri Vineyard and Estate at Martletwy, produces country wines, liqueurs and non-alcoholic drinks picked from Pembrokeshire's hedgerows, trees and vines.

Princes Gate Spring Water is one of Wales' leading bottled water manufacturers, and is situated on an organic farm at Narberth. The ethos of the brand is "centred on its love of the climate and the precious landscape from which the water is abstracted".

== Farmers' Markets ==
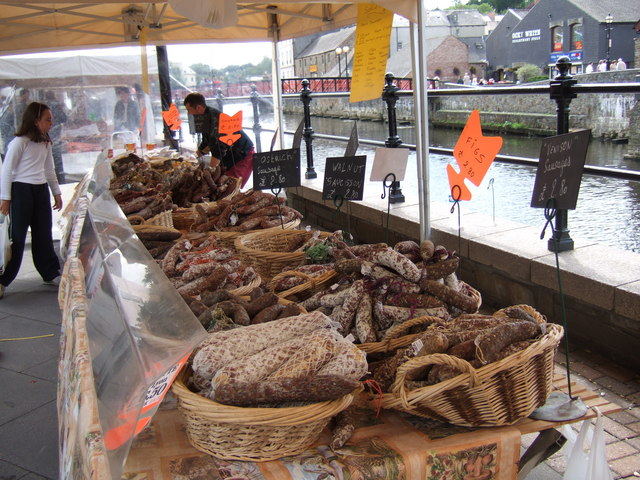
Sausage stall, Haverfordwest French Market - geograph.org.uk - 226610

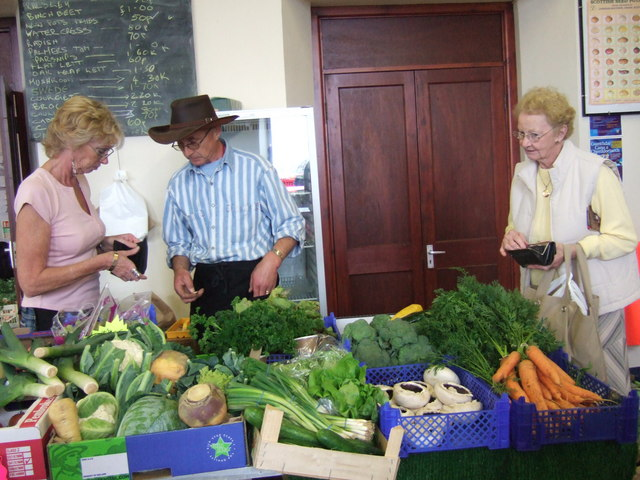
Market stall, Fishguard-Abergwaun – geograph.org.uk – 224820

Haverfordwest has the main county market. This is held on Saturdays, selling all kinds of meat, poultry and fish in season. Pembroke market is also on a Saturday, while Tenby has a daily market for fish.

Haverfordwest also holds a fortnightly farmer's market at which all produce has to be from a 40-mile radius of the town and is considered one of the best farmers' markets in South West Wales. It is held on Fridays between 9am and 3pm at Riverside Shopping, Haverfordwest.

Pembroke holds a farmers' market on Saturday between 9.30am and 1.30pm in Pembroke Town Hall, while Fishguard holds a farmers' market between 9am and 1pm in Fishguard Town Hall. St Dogmaels Local Producers market is held at the Coach House Visitor centre, near the medieval abbey and watermill. It is held every Tuesday between 9am and 1pm and includes stalls selling fish, shellfish cheese, cakes, preserves, eggs and flour. St Davids Country Market is held from March to December from 8am to 1pm at St Davids and offers a range of baked produce, fresh vegetables, jams and craft items.

== Food festivals ==
Food events in Pembrokeshire include the Saundersfoot and St Davids Food Market, with food and craft stalls. It is usually held on a weekend around 1 March, which is St Davids Day. Haverfordwest Farmer's Market holds an Easter Market and a Spring Market in May, both of which include traditional activities and food tasting. In June, Pembrokeshire's early potato crop is celebrated in the Pembroke Potato Festival held at Pembroke Town Hall.

Pembrokeshire Fish Week is described as "a festival for those who love fish and those who don’t", it is a week-long, award-winning festival held annually in June across Pembrokeshire, with hundreds of activities related to fish and fishing and offering seafood tastings, foraging sessions and filleting classes with top chefs. There are also coastal activities, including snorkel safaris, eco-fishing, pond dipping, surfing and coasteering.

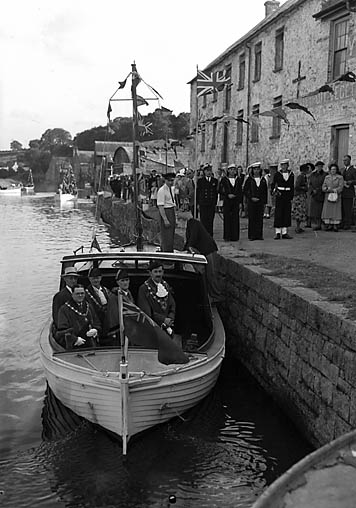
Haverfordwest River Pageant, 1951, photo by Geoff Charles from the Geoff Charles Collection at the National Library of Wales

Haverfordwest Beer and Cider Festival is a three-day summer festival set in the grounds of Haverfordwest Castle during August. The emphasis is on cask ale, with over 20 Welsh breweries participating, including Welsh craft cider and perry. Food is also available together with local music and live entertainment. The Pembrokeshire Agricultural Show is also held in August, at the Withybush showground, while the Frenni Food Festival at Crymych holds local food, crafts and entertainment.

In September, St Davids holds the Really Wild Food & Countryside Festival. This is a weekend festival taking place in May at Pwll Caerog Farm, Berea, St Davids. It is the only British food festival to focus on wild food and crafts, with chefs available to show how to find and prepare food foraged from hedgerows and beaches.

Narberth Food Festival is a weekend festival taking place in September at Narberth and attracts local producers, with chefs demonstrating recipes and techniques and live bands providing entertainment.

In December, Saundersfoot holds a Christmas Fayre with food, craft and entertainment.

== Marketing schemes ==
Pembrokeshire has its own logo called the Pembrokeshire Produce Mark, this is a certification mark which signifies that a product is made in Pembrokeshire or that retail outlets displaying the logo sell local produce. Members of the scheme display a logo identifying that the products sold have been made in Pembrokeshire or that they sell local products on the premises.

Pembrokeshire Produce Mark logo

Pembrokeshire Produce Direct is a co-operative of around 70 food producers with their own web site and a central delivery hub which allows the consumer to buy from as many producers as needed and to receive a single delivery. A weekly order cycle allows the majority of a purchaser's order to be specially produced. They were a True Taste Online Retailer of the Year for 2009/10. The majority of vegetables grown in Pembrokeshire are produced by the Potato Marketing Group (which uses a Puffin logo) and the Pembrokeshire Vegetable Growers' Association.

== History ==
Country house cuisine has been recorded in a number of historical recipe books from the county. Anne Phelps of Withybush House, Haverfordwest (now demolished), compiled a recipe book in about 1770. Recipes include Haricot Mutton, Green Pea Soup and Baked Beef.

An eighteenth century cook book associated with Slebech Hall (also demolished) includes recipes such as Cream Pancakes, Baked Herrings, Mr Anson's Pudding (Mr Anson was related to the owners of Slebech and later became Earl of Lichfield), Lemon Sponge, Boodle Club Cake (associated with Boodle's, London) and Amber Pudding.

A recipe book from Stackpole Court (also demolished, although the Stackpole Estate remains) includes recipes such as The Duke of Marlborough's White Fish Sauce, Doctor Oliver's Biscuits, A recipe for currie, A patty, British champagne (made from gooseberries) and Duke of Norfolk's Punch (drink).

In 2009, the actress and television presenter Jenny Kenna published Susan's Secrets, A Victorian Kitchen in Wales. Her great-grandmother, Susan Elizabeth Webb, was a cook who started work at age fifteen in Victorian era Pembrokeshire and kept a notebook of recipes popular at that time. The book also sets out her grandmother's story. The Withybush, Slebech and Stackpole cook books are held by Pembrokeshire Records Office. "Traditional Food From Wales", a book on Welsh cuisine by Bobby Freeman, contains the recipes mentioned above. Freeman, originally from England, ran a "pioneering Fishguard restaurant" in the 1960s which specialised in Welsh cuisine and she went on to write numerous books on Welsh cookery.

According to Freeman, all the hand written recipe collections compiled in Welsh country houses in the 17th, 18th and 19th centuries "are no different from their counterparts compiled in English mansions and do not contain a single reference to traditional Welsh dishes or methods of cooking". This led to Freeman's "long search to authenticate Welsh cookery" much of which was passed orally from mother to daughter". According to Freeman, the first record of Welsh cuisine, since the Laws of Hywel Dda and the poets of Medieval Welsh literature, was written down in the prize winning Eisteddfod entry of Mati Thomas, in 1928. Freeman arranged for the translation of this work, which is a unique collection of very old Welsh recipes collected from the memories of Welsh cooks while they were still alive to recall them.

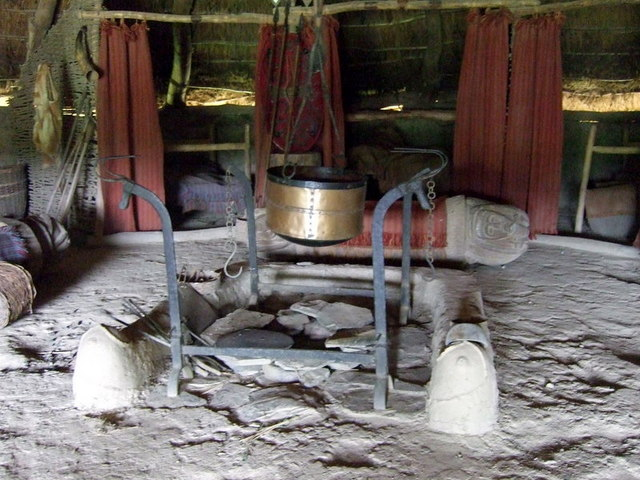
Castell Henllys, a reconstruction of an Iron Age Celtic roundhouse showing the hearth and a cooking pot (photo by Ceridwen).

== Pembrokeshire recipes ==
Original Pembrokeshire recipes include:

Katt Pies, these are lamb and dried fruit pies traditionally eaten while droving livestock on the route between Wales and London and sold at fairs throughout South Wales. They became particularly associated with the Templeton Fair, held annually in Pembrokeshire on 12 November.

Pembrokeshire Faggots are savoury faggots made with pig's liver, suet, breadcrumbs and onions. They were popular after pig-killing in Pembrokeshire in the nineteenth century.

Pembrokeshire laverbread cakes are made from pan-fried Laver bread, oats and lemon

Migiod, or yeast buns, are traditional to Pembrokeshire and were part of the New Year celebrations in the past. They are eaten warm and glazed with melted honey.

== Traditions associated with St David ==
The vegetarian diet has a long tradition in Pembrokeshire, being linked with the cult of St David. In the "Life of St David" written by Rhygyfarch it is recorded that, after a day of manual labour

Everyone relieves his weary limbs by partaking of dinner, but not to excess – for being filled to excess, even with bread on its own, gives rise to dissipation – rather, everyone receives a meal according to the varying condition of their bodies or their age. They do not serve dishes of different flavours, nor richer types of food, but feeding on bread and herbs seasoned with salt, they quench their burning thirst with a temperate kind of drink. Then, for either the sick, those advanced in age, or likewise those tired by a long journey, they provide some other pleasures of tastier food, for it is not to be dealt out to all in equal measure.

St David lived on bread, water and herbs, as did each subsequent Bishop of St David's until bishop Morgeneu I broke the tradition and was, as a consequence, slain in 999.

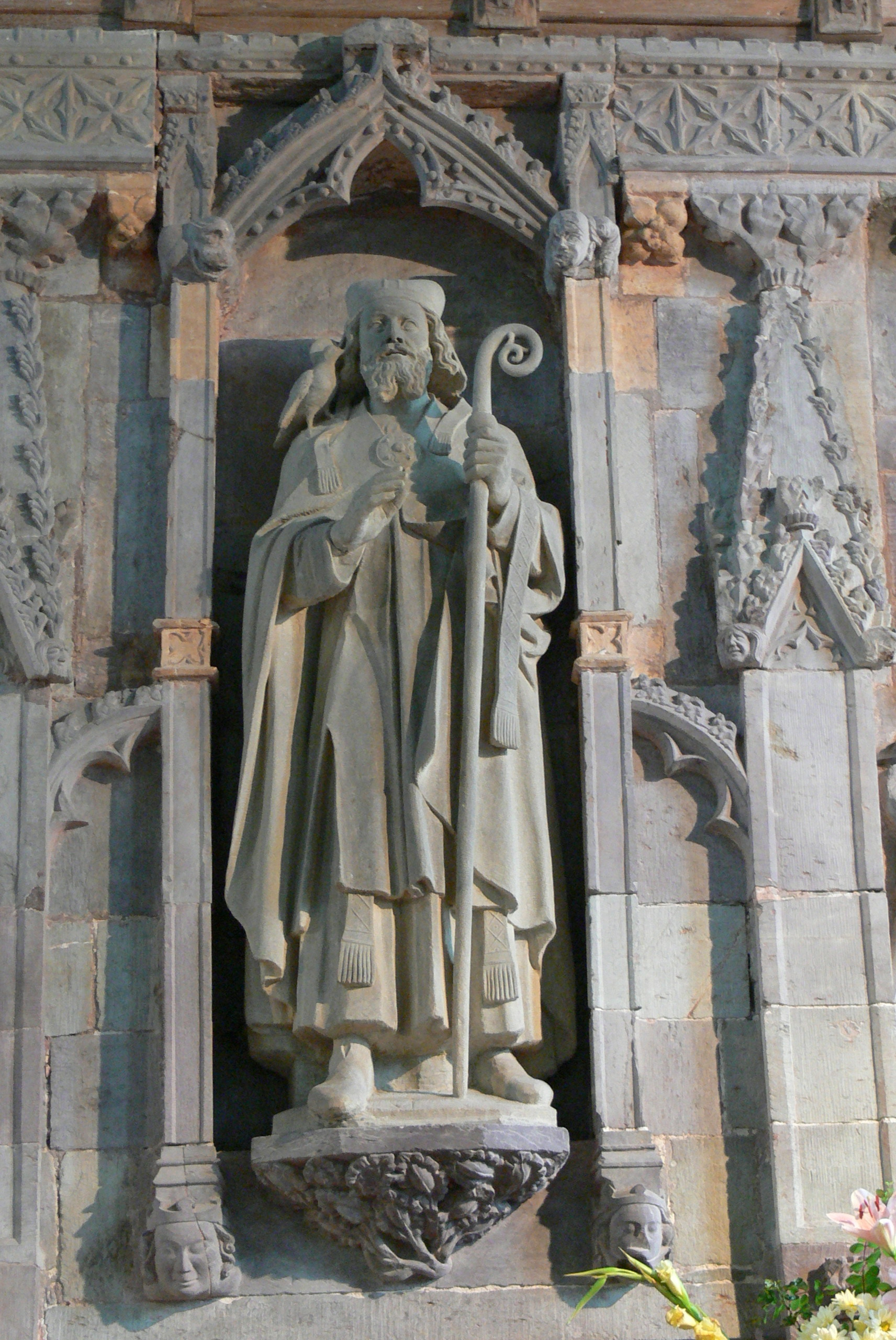
Statue of St David at St David's Cathedral

As well as being the patron saint of Wales, St David is also considered to be the patron saint of vegetarians and vegans (although St David did eat honey). Vegetarian for Life have prepared vegetarian recipes to mark Saint David's Day, including Leek and Cheese Muffins, Leek Soup, Leek and Cheese Crumble, Welsh Crempog and Bara Brith

The leek is traditionally associated with St David. On Saint David's Day the youngest member of each company (military unit) of the Royal Welsh eat a raw leek in front of the entire regiment and this is then followed by a toast (honor)

== Video links ==
- Pembrokeshire Early Potatoes video #1 Harvesting potatoes at Norton Farm, Pembrokeshire
- Pembrokeshire Early Potatoes video #2 Harvesting potatoes at Upper Haythog Farm, Pembrokeshire
- Pembrokeshire Cheesemaking video Cheesemaking at Llangloffan Farm, Pembrokeshire with Leon Downey
- Pembrokeshire flour mill Restoration and operation of Y Felin Mill, St. Dogmael's, Pembrokeshire
- Pembrokeshire seaweed Collecting and preparing laverbread on a beach in Pembrokeshire
- The Scott Rea Project Welsh Rarebit road trip in Pembrokeshire
- Pembrokeshire turkeys Justin Scale, free-range turkey farmer
- Welsh Cakes A Taste of Pembrokeshire – Welsh Cakes on This Morning
- Welsh Cakes Baking Lockdown Welsh Cakes with Bake Off's Michelle Evans Fecci

== See also ==
- Welsh cuisine
- Cuisine of Carmarthenshire
- Cuisine of Ceredigion
- Cuisine of Gower
- Cuisine of Monmouthshire
- Cuisine of Swansea
- Cuisine of the Vale of Glamorgan
