= Princes Gate Spring Water =

Mineral water brand

Princes Gate
- Country: Wales
- Produced by: Nestle
- Introduced: August 1991; 34 years ago
- Tagline: Delivered by clouds. Filtered by rock. Bottled by us.
- Type: Still mineral
- pH: 6.2
- Calcium (Ca): 58
- Chloride (Cl): 18
- Bicarbonate (HCO_{3}): 202
- Magnesium (Mg): 11.5
- Nitrate (NO_{3}): 20
- Potassium (K): 1.1
- Sodium (Na): 12
- Sulfate (SO_{4}): 9.1
- TDS: 233
- All concentrations in milligrams per liter (mg/L); pH without units

Princes Gate Spring Water is a brand of Welsh mineral water distributed across the United Kingdom. It is owned by Nestlé. The water is sourced from a spring near the hamlet of Princes Gate near Narberth in Pembrokeshire, southwest Wales.

== History ==
Princes Gate was launched in August 1991, when David and Glyn Jones began bottling spring water in a micro plant on their farm in Princes Gate, Pembrokeshire, in a bid to diversify their business in the face of government quotas on milk production. The initial machinery was capable of filling just 36 bottles a day; this was expanded until most of the outbuildings on the farm were being used. A bespoke bottling plant opened in 2004, and a high-speed bottling line in 2007, capable of filling 22,000 bottles an hour. A second production line capable of bottling a further 8,000 per hour was opened to meet the increasing requirements. In 2013 the company produces 60million bottles of water a year.

In 2013 Princes Gate employed 60 staff. The company has taken steps to reduce the environmental impact of its operation, including building facilities to manufacture their own bottles on site to reduce transportation costs and installing solar panels on the roof of their factory. One Enercon E53 wind turbine was built on the site near Ludchurch to supply power to their bottling plant.

In 2018, Nestlé purchased a majority stake in the company, which is the UK's eighth-largest producer of bottled water.
