= Aberystwyth Sea2shore Food Festival =

Food festival in Ceredigion, Wales

- Dates: October
- Location: Aberystwyth
- Founded: 2011
- Founders: local community
- Website: Sea2shore Food Festival Facebook page

Aberystwyth Sea2shore Food Festival is an annual food festival held at Aberystwyth, Ceredigion over three days during October.

== Overview ==
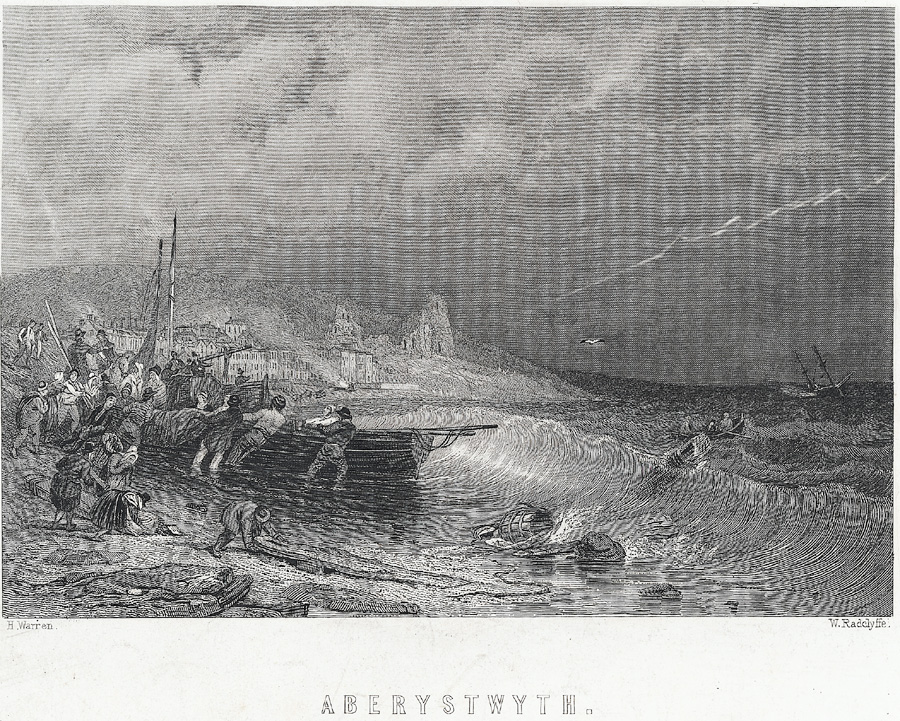
People pulling a boat ashore in a stormy sea, print by William Radclyffe from the collection of the National Library of Wales

The festival was established in 2011 in order to raise awareness of the fishing industry in Cardigan Bay and to help to celebrate and promote locally sourced food and drink.

The festival is located on the promenade at Aberystwyth where stalls offer locally produced food. Food demonstrations have been given by local and Michelin starred chefs. Aberystwyth Farmers Market also participates (winners of Best Food Market in the BBC Radio 4 Food and Farming Awards 2014). The festival also promotes local, young entrepreneurs.

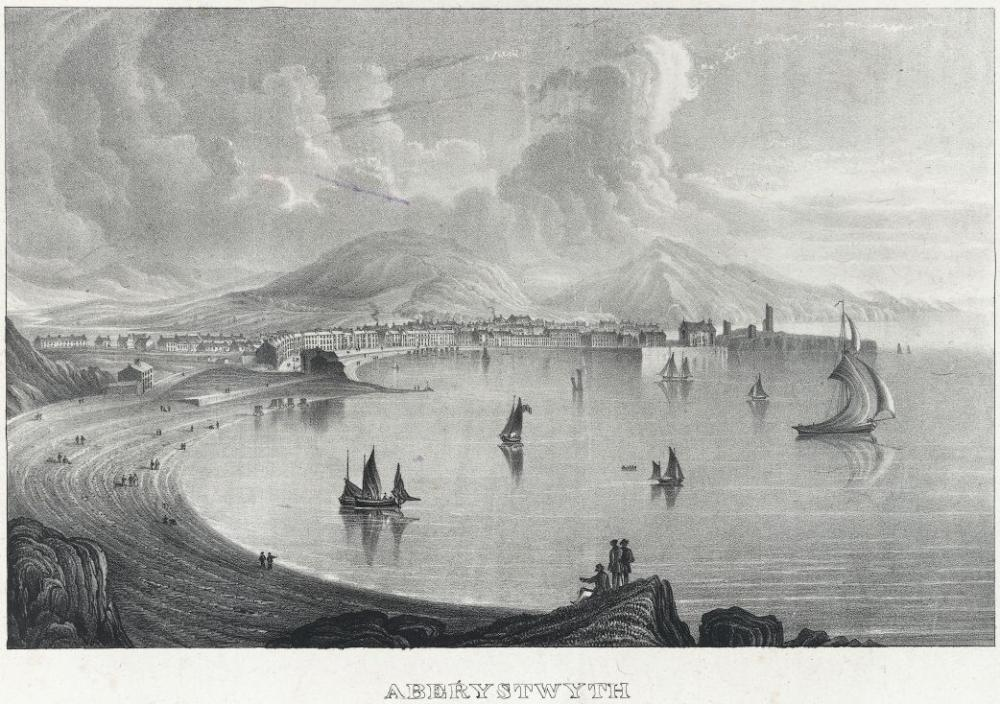
Aberystwyth, from Craiglais, print by William Crane from the collection of the National Library of Wales

Other events have included demonstrations by Aberystwyth Surf Life Saving Club, fishing and fly-tying demonstrations, art and craft stalls and children's craft activities, go karts, and an aquarium featuring local fish. The Wildlife Trust of South and West Wales organise dolphin watches and seashore safaris. Other organisations participating include the RNLI, who run Aberystwyth Lifeboat Station, Aberystwyth Beach Buddies, RSPB, and St John Ambulance.

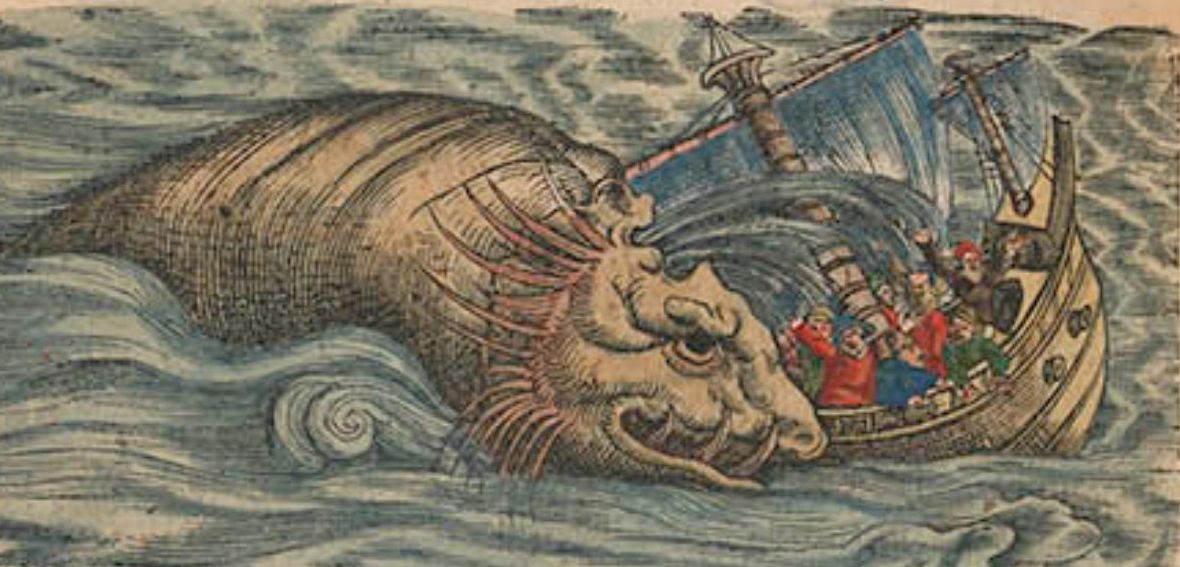
Print of a sea monster from Conrad Gesner’s book Historia Animalium, 1563

In 2018, the festival was visited by “Cragen the Sea Monster”, a 20m long creation of the mythical Welsh sea monster made from waste plastic. Cragen had made a journey around the Welsh coast in order to promote a plastic free sea. The model was created by Cardigan-based Small World Theatre who took on the project as part of Wales’ celebration of the Year of the Sea. The monster is inspired by Swiss naturalist Conrad Gesner who published Historia Animalium, a book written in the 1500s with illustrations of sea creatures.

== Structure and rationale ==
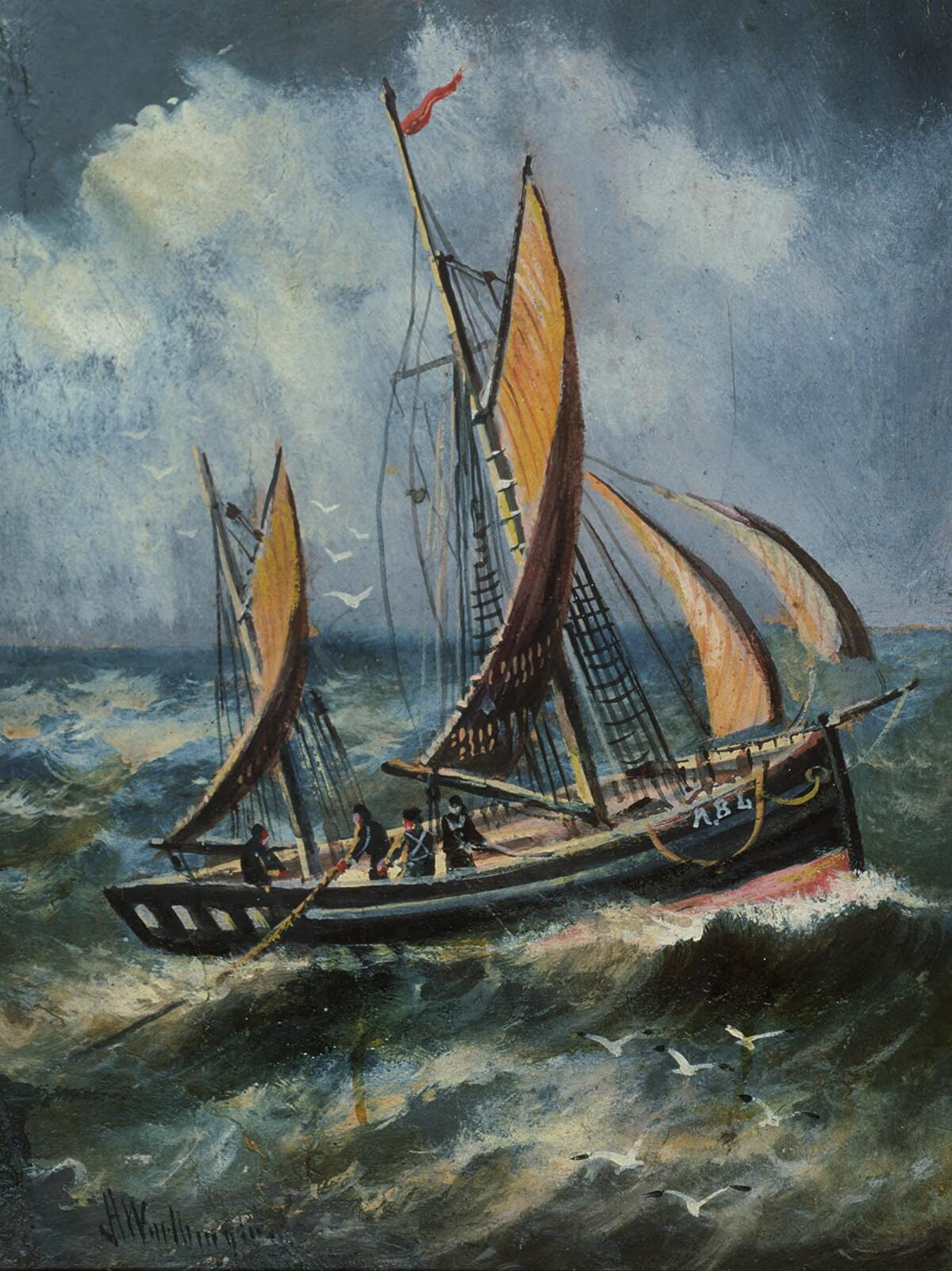
Aberystwyth Trawler, oil painting by Alfred Worthington from the collection of the National Library of Wales

The festival was established in order to raise awareness of the fishing industry in Cardigan Bay, which has a rich sustainable source of fish and shellfish. The festival was started by Aberystwyth Sea Anglers, Cardigan Bay Fisherman’s Association, Communities First and Food Centre Wales.

The festival connects with Ceredigion’s maritime history. In 1900, there were 213 ships registered in Aberystwyth harbour employing approximately 900 people.

The grass roots nature of the festival means that it is guided by the local community and enables visitors to engage directly with fishermen, lifeboat crews, surf lifesavers, and rowers.

== Festival opening ==
The festival has been opened by:

2015: Taron Egerton, who attended Ysgol Penglais School.

2017: Alana Spencer (winner of BBC One's The Apprentice in 2016), who went to school in Aberaeron

== See also ==
- Cuisine of Ceredigion
