= Welsh Perry and Cider Festival =

- Dates: May
- Location: Caldicot Castle
- Founded: 2001
- Founders: Welsh Perry and Cider Society
- Attendance: 3,000
- Website: https://welshciderfestival.wordpress.com/

Welsh Cider and Perry Festival is an annual festival for cider and perry held at Caldicot Castle in Monmouthshire.

== Overview ==
The festival was established in 2001 and takes place in May. There is an entry fee.

The festival was formed by members of the Welsh Perry and Cider Society with the support of the Clytha Arms public house near Abergavenny. In 2013 the festival moved to Caldicot Castle. The festival takes place over four days and attracts 3000 people.

The festival features around 120 ciders and 35 perries. In 2018 the festival included international ciders from England, Ireland, Scotland, France, Czech Republic and elsewhere. The festival also offers cider and perry workshops and hosts the annual Welsh Perry & Cider Championships, with judging by industry experts. The winner is crowned Champion Cider or Perry Maker of Wales.

The festival includes live music, craft stalls and all day entertainment. Overnight accommodation is provided on site with camping facilities for tents, caravans and motorhomes.

== See also ==
- Cuisine of Wales
