= Cardigan River and Food Festival =

Food festival in Ceredigion, Wales

- Dates: August
- Location: Cardigan
- Founded: 1998
- Founders: Menter Aberteifi Cyf.
- Attendance: 5,000
- Website: http://www.cardigan-food-festival.co.uk/

Cardigan River and Food Festival is an annual food festival held at Cardigan, Ceredigion.

The festival reflects Cardigan's association with the River Teifi and includes cookery demonstrations, river events, live music, dancing and other related activities.

== Overview ==
The objective of the festival is to celebrate the quality and diversity of the local independent food producers that are found in Wales. The event attracts up to 100 local producers, including cheesemakers and rare breed (agriculture) farmers.

The festival includes a local food market and cookery demonstrations by local chefs using local produce. An area called the Food Court has seats and tables that allow visitors a view of the river while they eat and drink. There is an Entertainments Area which hosts musical performers, including singers, dancers and folk, rock, dance and classical music groups. Activities connected with the river include boat rides, best dressed boat competitions and rescue demonstrations by the RNLI. Coracle demonstrations are given by fishermen from Cilgerran using coracles built in the distinctive River Teifi design. There is also an annual long boat race between clubs from Cardigan and St Dogmaels.

Dinghies and day boats from the Teifi Boat Club take part in the celebration and the local Outdoor Swimming Society also complete their annual 10k Teifi swim at the festival. The swim starts at Cardigan with swimmers proceeding upriver to Cilgerran and back.

== Structure ==
The festival is held at Cardigan's Quay Street Car Park. There is a festival entry fee.

The festival was established by Menter Aberteifi Cyf., a social enterprise set up in 1996, with the stated objective "to promote and implement the successful regeneration of Cardigan Town for the benefit of the community". The organisation has since developed as a not-for-profit company limited by guarantee.

== See also ==
- Aberaeron
- Ceredigion
- Cuisine of Ceredigion.
