= Lampeter Food Festival =

Food festival in Ceredigion, Wales

Gwyl Fwyd Llanbed - Lampeter Food Fest
- Dates: July
- Location: Lampeter
- Founded: 1997
- Founders: Lampeter Chamber of Trade
- Website: http://www.lampeterevents.co.uk/g%c5%b5yl-fwyd-llanbed--lampeter-food-fest.html

Gŵyl Fwyd Llanbed - Lampeter Food Fest (previously known as Ffair Fwyd Llanbed - Lampeter Food Festiva) is an annual food festival held at Lampeter in Ceredigion.

== Overview ==
Lampeter Food Festival is held in the grounds of the University of Wales Trinity St David at Lampeter, usually in July.

The festival attracts around 100 stalls selling food and drink and is a key local event. There are live cookery demonstrations by chefs, as well as cook-offs and culinary crafts.

== Focus ==
Although the festival focuses mainly on food and drink it also highlights the many crafts available in the area. In addition, reflecting the association with the university, there are stands from charities and educational organisations.

There is also music and other forms of entertainment. The festival also reflects the influence of alternative lifestyles associated with Ceredigion.

== Structure ==
The festival was established by Lampeter Chamber of Trade and thereafter was run as a private company limited by guarantee with the support of volunteers, Lampeter Round Table and local businesses.

In May 2019, a new committee took over the running of the festival, supported by Lampeter Town Council, Lampeter Chamber of Trade and the University of Wales Trinity St. David and the festival was renamed Gŵyl Fwyd Llanbed - Lampeter Food Fest.

== Location ==
The festival is hosted by the University of Wales Trinity St Davids in their college grounds.

== Financial support ==
The festival has received financial support from Lampeter Town Council, Ceredigion County Council and Welsh Government.

== Videos ==
- Lampeter Food Festival 2015
- Lampeter Food Festival 2018

== See also ==
- Lampeter
- Ceredigion
- Cuisine of Ceredigion.
