= Newport Food Festival =

Food festival in Wales

- Dates: May
- Location: Newport
- Founded: 2010
- Founders: Newport City Council
- Attendance: 20,000
- Patrons: Tiny Rebel Brewery; Celtic Manor Resort; Newport Now Business Improvement District; Friar’s Walk
- Website: http://www.newport.gov.uk/newportFoodFestival/en/Newport-Food-Festival.aspx

Newport Food Festival is an annual food festival for held at Newport, Wales.

== Overview ==
The festival was established in 2010 with over 80 businesses participating and takes place in October. The event is free.

The festival has stages holding cooking demonstrations from local and national chefs. There is a chefs’ cook off and a teen chefs event. Food and drink stalls are located along High Street, the pedestrianised area of Bridge Street and on Westgate Square

Activities include live music, inflatable chefs on stilts, a balloon modelling magic chef, face painting and colouring activities.

There was no festival in 2020 because of the COVID-19 pandemic.

== Structure ==
The festival is organised by Newport City Council and supported by volunteers. It is sponsored by Tiny Rebel, Celtic Manor Resort, Newport Now Business Improvement District and Friars Walk, Newport

== See also ==
- Cuisine of Wales
- You Tube, Newport Food Festival 2018
