= Caerphilly Food Festival =

Annual event in Wales

- Dates: May
- Location: Caerphilly
- Founded: 2012
- Founders: Caerphilly County Borough Council
- Attendance: 10,000
- Website: www.caerphillyfoodfestival.co.uk

Caerphilly Food Festival is an annual food festival held in Caerphilly, South Wales.

== Overview ==
The festival takes place in May and attracts up to 100 stall holders to the streets of the town. The event is free.

The festival reflects the town’s traditional association with Caerphilly cheese, although the cheese is no longer produced in the town. There is a dedicated cheese market held at Twyn car park and there is also a farmers’ market.

Other activities include a craft fair, face painting, puppet shows, falconry, donkey rides, fun fair rides and street theatre.

In 2017 the festival celebrated local myths and legends to link with Visit Wales’ 2017 Year of Legends campaign. The aim was to introduce local legends into the festivities through street theatre, storytelling, food and music.
