= Cardiff International Food and Drink Festival =

Annual food festival held at Cardiff, Wales

- Dates: July
- Locations: Cardiff, Wales
- Founded: 1999; 27 years ago
- Attendance: 50,000
- Website: Cardiff International Food and Drink Facebook page

Cardiff International Food and Drink Festival is an annual food festival held in Cardiff, Wales.

== Overview ==
The festival is held over three days during July, from Friday to Sunday, at Roald Dahl Plas (The Oval Basin) in Cardiff Bay, next to the Mermaid Quay complex.

There are over 100 local, national and international producers. There is a Street Food Piazza, a Producers' Fayre and Farmers' Market. The Street Food Piazza is the biggest outdoor street food piazza in Wales, with numerous bars and stalls along the water's edge at Cardiff Bay. There are daily children's workshops for young chefs to create their own dishes. There are also craft stalls and live music.

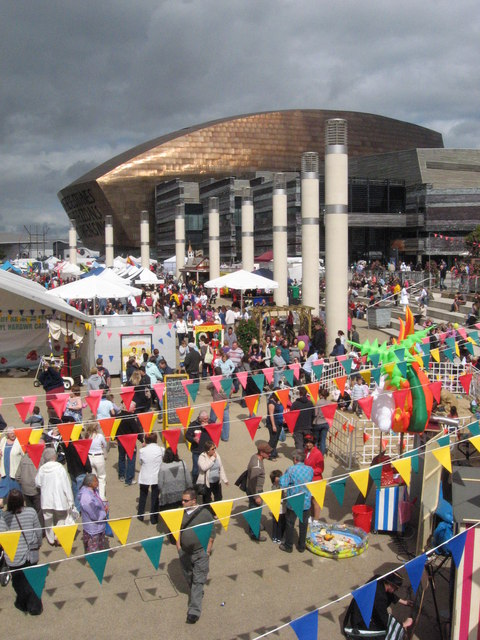
Cardiff International Food and Drink Festival

== See also ==
- Cuisine of Wales
