= Narberth Food Festival =

Annual food festival in Wales

- Dates: September
- Location: Narberth
- Founded: 1998
- Attendance: 7,000 (2017)
- Patrons: Angela Gray and Elisabeth Luard
- Website: http://www.narberthfoodfestival.com

Narberth Food Festival is an annual food festival held at Town Moor, Narberth, Pembrokeshire.

== Overview ==
The festival was established in 1998 and is run by volunteers. It takes place in September over a weekend and has up to 150 businesses taking part, with 99% being local and Welsh retailers. It has up to 7,000 visitors (2017). There is an entrance fee for adults.

The festival has food stalls from local and Welsh producers. There is a Talk and Taste tent where producers share their products and also a licensed bar.

Other activities include celebrity chef demonstrations, live music from local bands, and activities for children.

Previous musicians supporting the festival have included Jodie Marie who is from Narberth and other local groups such as the Saint City Jazz Band and Carmarthen Ukuleles.

== Awards ==
The festival has twice won the gold award for Best Event in the Pembrokeshire Tourism Awards.

== Economic impact ==
A survey commissioned by Welsh Government of attendees at the festival showed that 91% of those surveyed said that the festival had increased their awareness of local food and produce. Respondents were also asked how much they expected to spend in the local area, not including the food festival, with 23% saying they expected to spend between £10 and £20, and a further 22% expecting to spend between £20 and £50.

== Videos ==
- Narberth Food Festival
- Narberth Food Festival 2012
- Narberth Food Festival 2013
- Narberth Food Festival 2014
- Narberth Food Festival 2016
- Narberth Food Festival 2017

== See also ==
- Narberth, Pembrokeshire
- Pembrokeshire
- Cuisine of Pembrokeshire.
