= Anglesey Oyster & Welsh Produce Festival =

Annual food festival in Wales

- Genre: food festival
- Dates: October
- Location: Anglesey
- Founded: 2006
- Founders: Anglesey Oyster & Shellfish Festival Ltd
- Attendance: 3,000
- Website: angleseyoysterfestival.com

The Anglesey Oyster and Welsh Produce Festival is an annual food festival that was established in 2006 and is held during October in Anglesey, Wales.

== Overview ==
The festival started as an informal social event based on the consumption of oysters, drinking and dancing and was formalised into a food festival in 2006 when it was also expanded to include other types of food.

== Focus ==
The original focus of the festival was originally seafood, in particular local oyster production which is organised around the fast-flowing waters of the Menai Strait. The festival has since expanded to include other food types from local producers. Many of the producers are local farmers and fishermen who produce beef, lamb, lobsters and oysters. Some of these producers have diversified into producing cheese, chocolate and real ale. The festival has been described as "a friendly food fair giving visitors the opportunity to meet and build relationships with over 40 producers".

The festival has included cookery demonstrations, talks from producers, recipe ideas, cookery tips and competitions, including a sausage competition, and a Music and Mussels event. The event has also organised a black tie gala dinner and entertainment has included Welsh and Irish dancing. There is an entertainment marquee.

== Structure and support ==
The festival is supported by volunteers and organised by a limited company, Anglesey Oyster & Shellfish Festival Ltd. The festival has also received Welsh Government support.

== Location ==
The festival is located at Trearddur and takes place at the Trearddur Bay Hotel, Lon Isallt, Trearddur Bay, Anglesey, LL65 2UN.

The festival has around 3,000 visitors and there is an entry fee.
