= Brecon Beacons Food Festival =

Annual food festival in Brecon, Wales

- Dates: October
- Location: Brecon
- Founded: 1997
- Founders: Not for profit organisation
- Attendance: 10,000
- Website: https://www.breconbeaconsfoodfestival.co.uk/

The Brecon Beacons Food Festival is an annual food festival that was established in 1998. The festival is held during October in Brecon, a town which is located in the Brecon Beacons National Park.

== Overview ==
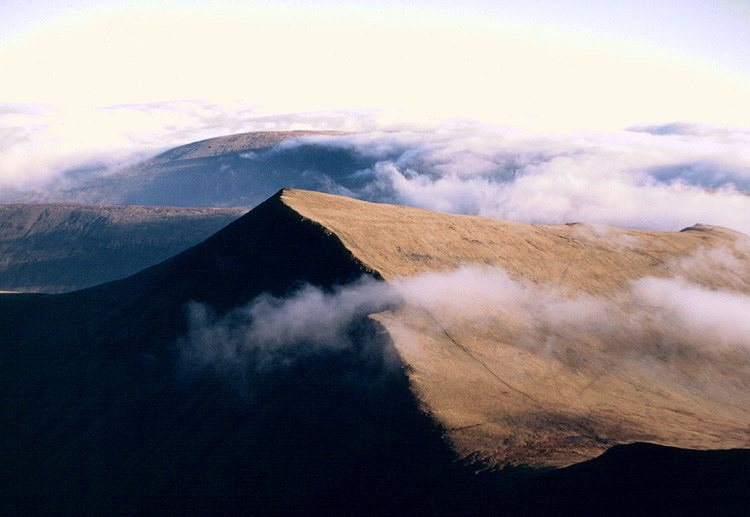
View of the Brecon Beacons

The Brecon Beacons Food Festival attracts around 70 stalls selling food and drink and is considered to be a key local event. The festival is timed to coincide with the local harvest season and aims to promote the town of Brecon, promote local food and drink producers and raise awareness of the local farming industry and the type of produce available in the Brecon Beacons and surrounding area.

== Focus ==
The festival focus is mainly on food and drink with live cookery demonstrations by chefs, as well as cookery presentations and culinary crafts.

There is also music and other forms of entertainment, including talks, demonstrations, educational activities, and activities for children.

Celebrity guests have included the S4C television chef Nerys Howel, the weather presenters Derek Brockway, Sue Charles, and Ruth Wignall, the Welsh television presenter and naturalist Iolo Williams and Colin Grey, Captain of the Welsh Olympic Chefs Team.

== Structure and support ==
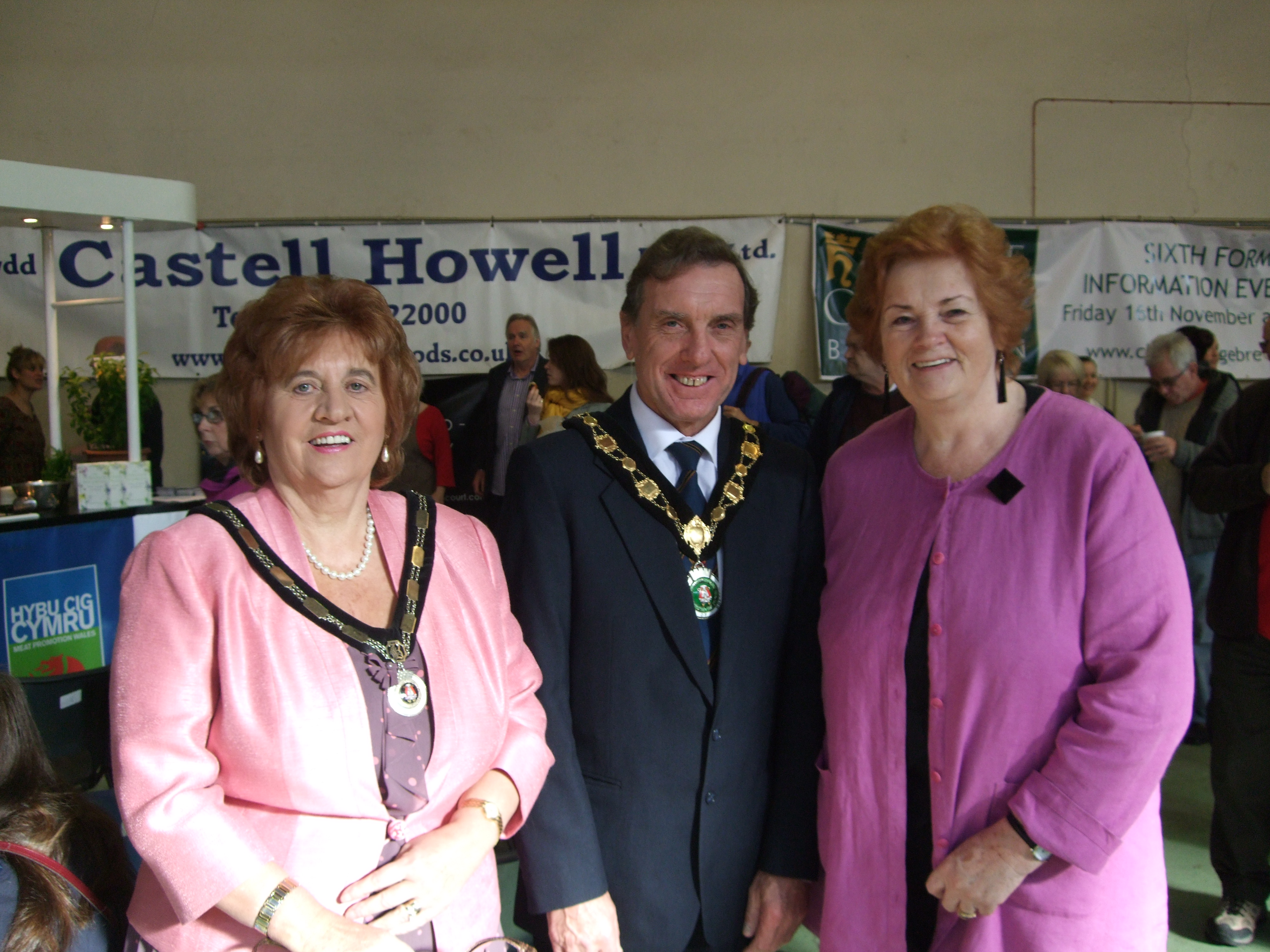
Brecon Beacons Food Festival, 2012 opening

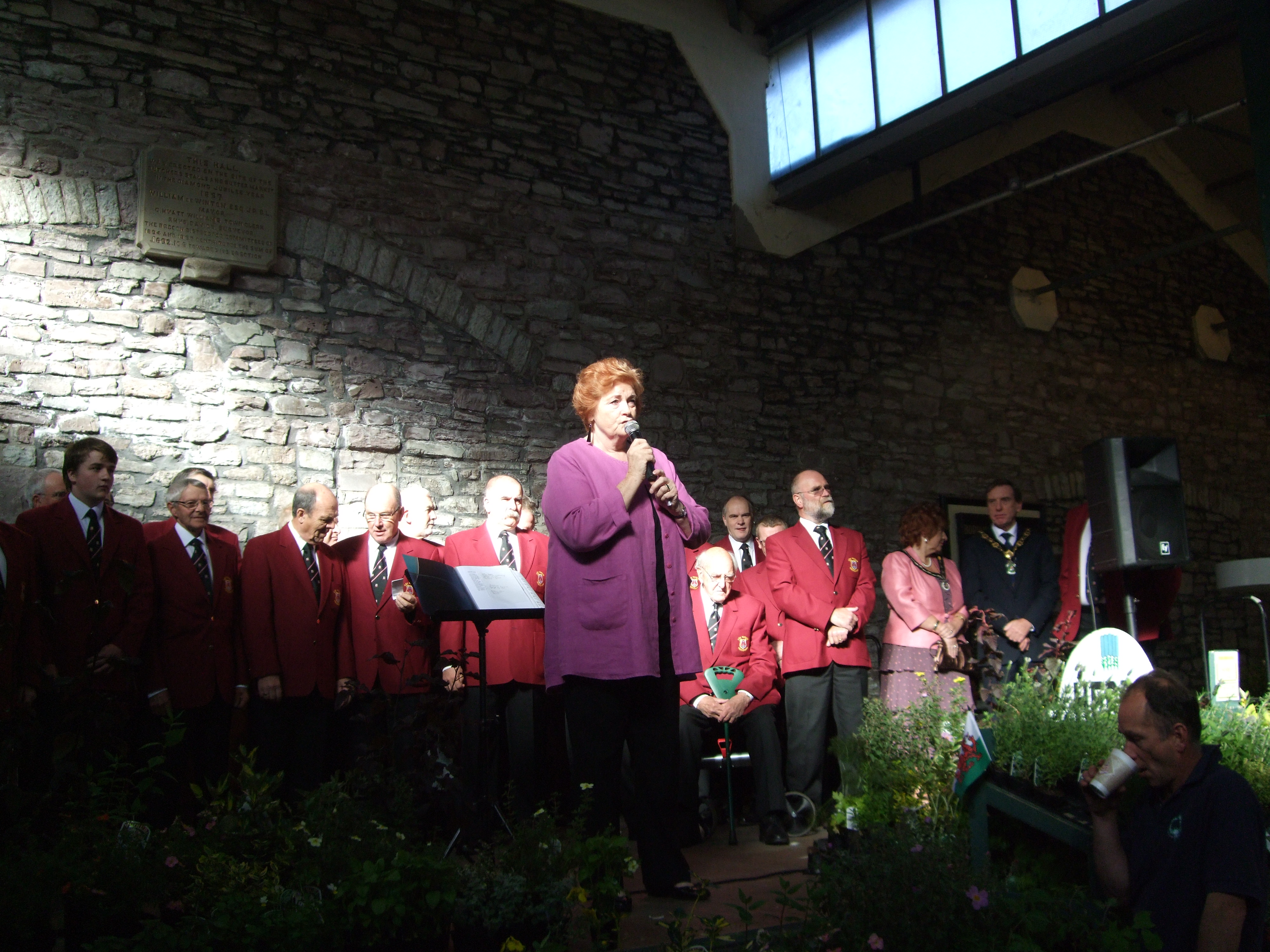
Brecon Beacons Food Festival, 2012 opening

The festival is a nonprofit organisation and surplus revenue is reinvested into the festival. The festival has a number of sponsors, including Castell Howell and Brecon Chamber of Trade and Commerce and has been supported by Welsh Government through the Food Festival Grant Scheme. The festival has also sought to raise funds through GoFundMe.

== Location ==
The festival is held indoors in the Market Hall in Brecon and has around 10,000 visitors. There is no entry fee.
