= Big Cheese Festival =

Food festival in Caerphilly, Wales

The Big Cheese Festival
- Location: Caerphilly
- Founded: 1998
- Founders: Caerphilly County Borough Council
- Attendance: 80,000
- Website: www.caerphillycheesefestival.co.uk

The Big Cheese Festival is an annual food festival held in July that was established in 2000 and is held in Caerphilly.

== Overview ==
The Big Cheese Festival is a festival dedicated to Caerphilly cheese and events are organised around this theme.

The festival is notable for being a major event in the town of Caerphilly, attracting up to 80,000 visitors over three days. The event is also notable for being the only dedicated cheese festival in Wales.

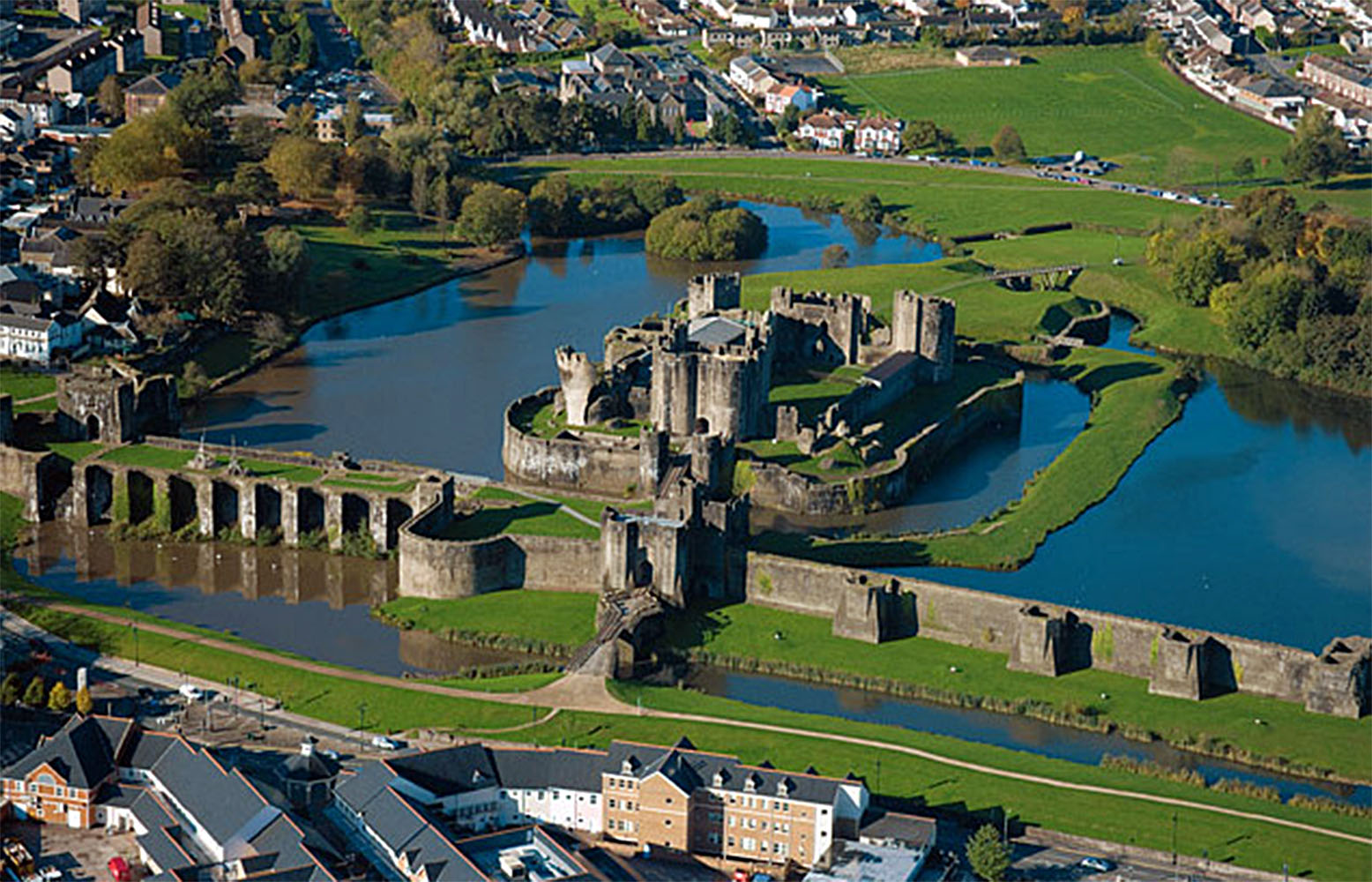
Caerphilly Castle aerial view

The festival is held in and around Caerphilly Castle which is the largest castle in Wales and one of the largest in Europe. The event is free and the castle also allows free entry during the event.

No festival was held in 2020 or 2021, as a result of the COVID-19 pandemic.

In 2022 the festival was hoped to make a return, but due to development work being undertaken at Caerphilly Castle the council announced they'd host an alternative event named Little Cheese Race. The Little Cheese Race returned in 2023, with the event being spread around Caerphilly town center and expanded to the grass behind Caerphilly Castle.

== Focus ==
The festival focuses on food and drink with street food vendors, a lounge bar area, food halls and live cookery demonstrations by chefs. The food halls contain stalls from local and regional Welsh food and drink producers with an emphasis on Welsh cuisine. There is also a cheese market with cheese makers from Wales and the rest of the UK.

The festival has previously included a Big Cheese Race, a funfair, firework displays, music and other forms of entertainment, including talks, demonstrations, educational activities, and activities for children.

Medieval re-enactments are held in the castle grounds, these include battles and displays, and a programme of events is held in the castle's Great Hall. The aim is to portray the history, heritage and culture of Caerphilly.

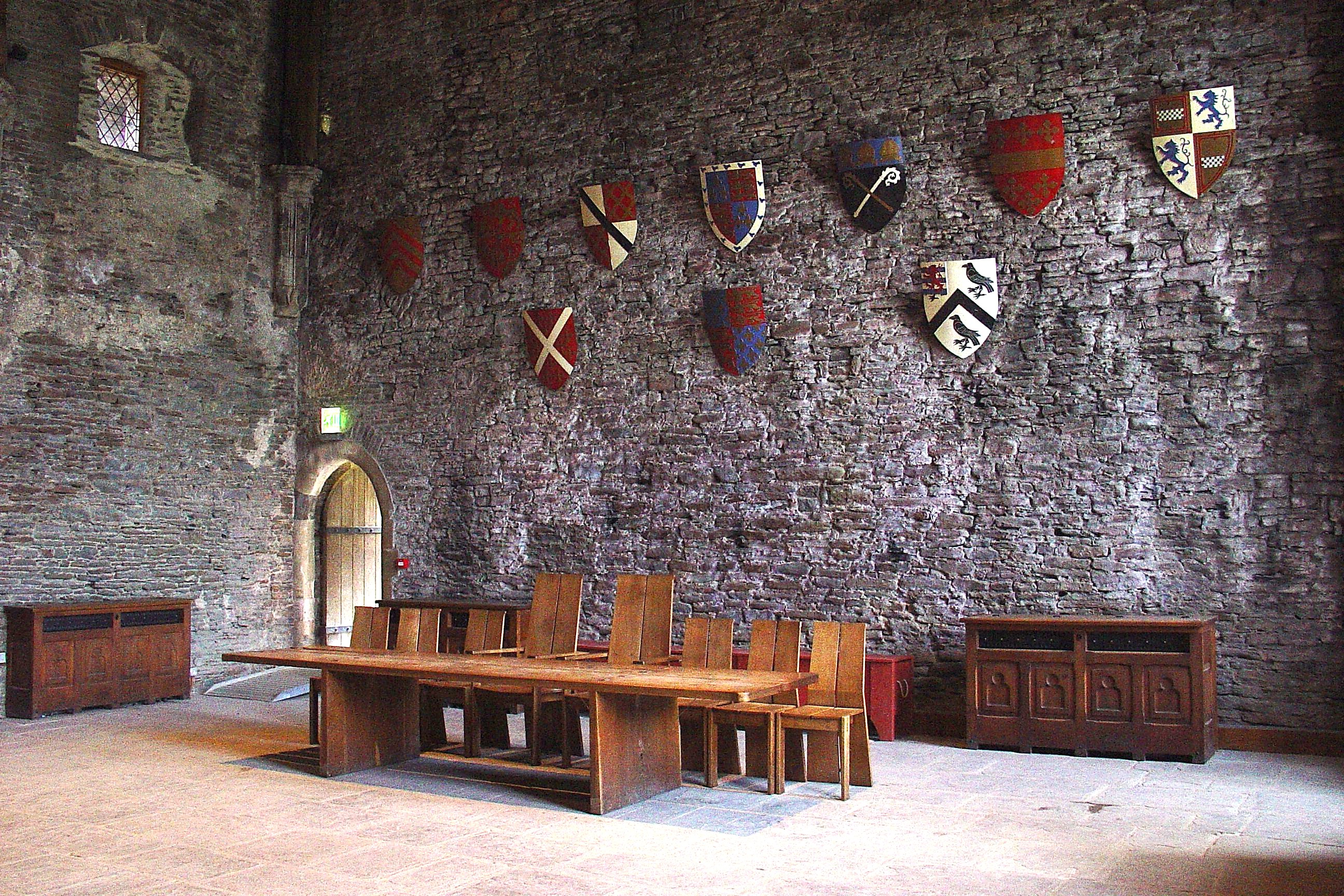
Great Hall, Caerphilly Castle

== Big Cheese Race ==
The Big Cheese Race follows a route around the castle with teams running in relay from the main event site. Teams pass traditional cheese stretchers, adorned with replica cheese truckles, between team members as they run a lap around the castle grounds. The race has different age categories and each team consists of four people.

== Structure and support ==
The festival is organised and run by Caerphilly County Borough Council. The festival has a number of sponsors and has been supported by Welsh Government through the Food Festival Grant Scheme.

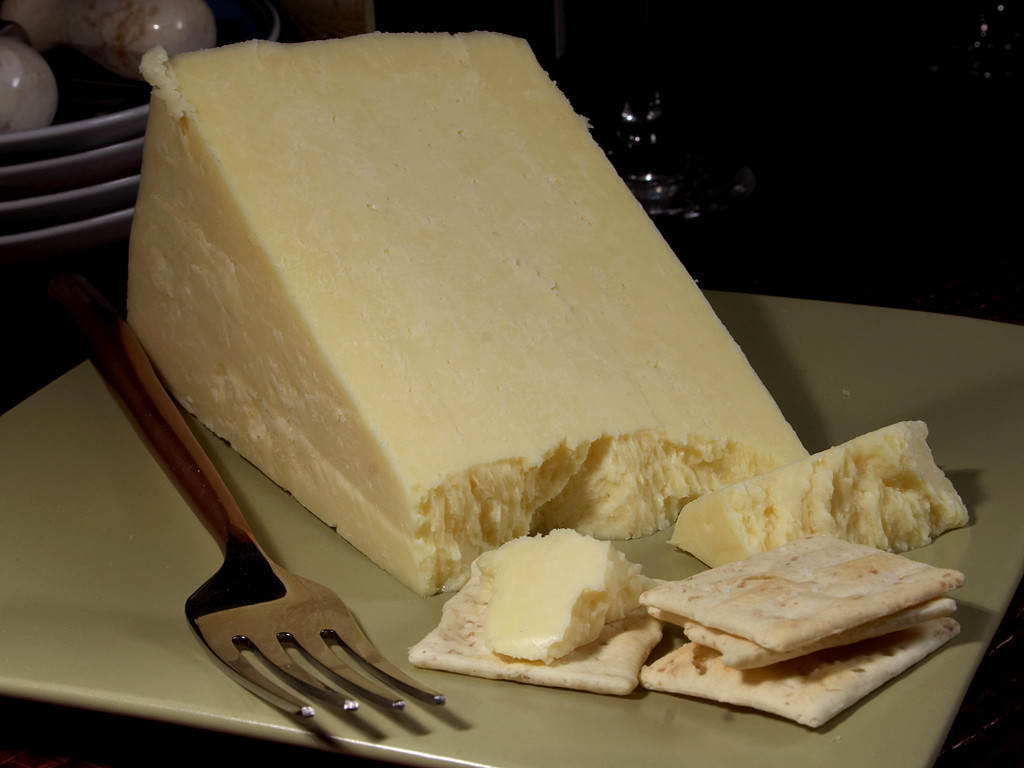
Caerphilly Cheese

The festival is held over a three-day weekend, starting on a Friday afternoon, and in 2012 it attracted around 80,000 visitors
