= Haverfordwest Beer and Cider Festival =

Annual food festival in Wales

- Dates: August
- Location: Haverfordwest
- Founded: 2005
- Founders: Richard Blacklaw-Jones
- Attendance: 3,000
- Website: https://haverhub.org.uk/haverbeer-fest/

Haverfordwest Beer and Cider Festival is an annual festival that takes place at Haverfordwest Castle during August.

== Overview ==
The festival was established in 2005 and is run by volunteers. It takes place over three days, during the August bank holiday weekend (Friday, August 25 to Sunday, August 27). It attracts up to 3,000 visitors.

The emphasis is on cask ale, with over 20 Welsh breweries participating and with up to 36 types of beer. The festival also offers a variety of cider, perry, wine and mead. There are also food stalls selling local food. Other activities include crafts, children's events and live music. There is an entry fee and at previous festivals this has included a souvenir glass and a programme with detailed tasting notes.

The festival has received funding from Welsh Government.

== See also ==
- Haverfordwest
- Pembrokeshire
- Cuisine of Pembrokeshire.
