= Cardigan Bay Seafood Festival =

Food festival in Ceredigion, Wales

- Dates: July
- Location: Aberaeron
- Founded: 1997
- Founders: Ceredigion fishermen
- Website: http://www.aberaeronfishfest.com/

Cardigan Bay Seafood Festival is an annual food festival held at Aberaeron in Ceredigion, Wales between 1997 and 2019.

The festival was established in 1997 by local fishermen to show what fish can be caught locally and how they can be prepared. Latterly it was run by a company limited by guarantee, supported by volunteers.

The festival is a free event that takes place in July over a weekend, with food stalls set up around Aberaeron's harbour and running from the end of Pen Cei (Quay Parade) along to Cadwgan Place. Over 40 food producers took part.

Participating chefs have included Stephen Terry, from The Hardwick in Abergavenny.

As of May 2022, the festival's website states that the event has been suspended since late 2019, giving reasons including overcrowding.

== See also ==
- Cuisine of Ceredigion
