= Pembrokeshire Fish Week =

Biannual food festival in Wales

- Dates: biannual, June and July
- Location: Pembrokeshire
- Founded: 2000
- Founders: Pembrokeshire County Council
- Attendance: 32,000 (2014)
- Website: http://www.pembrokeshirefishweek.co.uk/

Pembrokeshire Fish Week is an biannual food festival held in June and July that celebrates Pembrokeshire's seafood, coastline, beaches, and maritime heritage. It has many events that take place across the county.

== Events ==
During the festival there are over 250 events across the county with restaurants and pubs serving special menus, there are also cookery demonstrations, cookery classes, foraging events and educational activities.

Guided walks, sea fishing trips, fishing competitions, kayaking and surfing events also take place.

== Economic impact ==
Pembrokeshire Fish Week is a social enterprise that is supported by Pembrokeshire County Council and the port of Milford Haven. In 2014 the event brought £2.7m to the county's economy with 150 businesses taking part and an attendance estimated at 32,000 people. It is a key event in the county calendar and makes a significant contribution to the economy.

== Awards and recognition ==
Pembrokeshire Fish Week has been named as Number 1 in the Top 10 Best Food Festivals by The Independent (2013). It has also been listed as one of the UK's best food festivals by Conde Nast Traveller (2013) and Number 1 of the top 10 food festivals in the UK by Visit Britain (2011).

Pembrokeshire Fish Week won the Gold Award in the Food Tourism Destination category in the True Taste Food and Drink Awards 2009/ 2010, and Pembrokeshire Tourism's 'Premier Event Award' 2009 / 2010.

== Videos ==
- Pembrokeshire Fish Week video

== See also ==
- Pembrokeshire
- Cuisine of Pembrokeshire.
