= Cowbridge Food and Drink Festival =

Food festival held in Vale of Glamorgan, Wales

- Dates: May
- Location: Cowbridge
- Founded: 2004
- Founders: Cowbridge Charter Trust
- Attendance: 15,000
- Website: www.cowbridgefoodanddrink.org

Cowbridge Food and Drink Festival is an annual food festival held in Cowbridge, Vale of Glamorgan, Wales.

== Overview ==
The festival takes place over the May Bank Holiday (Sunday 29 and Monday 30 May) and attracts up to 15,000 people. There is an entry fee.

The festival has a wide variety of stalls, live demonstrations and attractions that are held each day. The food stalls are located at the Arthur John carpark. There are over 80 food and drink exhibitors, which have included an oyster bar and a champagne tent.

Other attractions have included a Craft Fayre selling jewellery, homeware and other items. Children's activities are held in The Old Hall Gardens and have included magic shows, face-painting and treasure hunts.

== Educational projects ==
In 2016 the festival obtained funding for an educational programme focused on demonstrations promoting healthy eating and cooking on a budget.

In 2017, the festival's Forgotten Foods project explored the culinary traditions, heritage and history of Welsh cuisine, including traditional recipes such as Welsh cakes, bara brith, Welsh rabbit and cawl. These were prepared in a series of professional demonstrations that allowed people to learn about Welsh preparation methods and the history of the country's traditional dishes.

At the Old Hall Gardens site two local academics and culinary experts, known as The History Chefs, conducted a taste tour of two past eras in a series of historical interactive food sampling sessions. They explored less mechanised means of production and harvesting and created food and drink with foraged and home grown ingredients from exhibitors such as Tast Natur and Herbs in Wales.

== Charitable work ==
In 2017 the festival raised money for Tŷ Hafan by exhibiting a sculpture of a Snow Puppy made from canvas for young people to finger-paint in a choice of three colours. This event was part of Snowdogs: Tails in Wales trail, a collaborative art event between Tŷ Hafan and Wild in Art. Painted Snow Dogs from across Wales were positioned at various locations in Cardiff and the Vale of Glamorgan. The Cowbridge Puppy was subsequently auctioned to raise further funds for Tŷ Hafan.

The festival has also set up the first community fridge in South Wales for people to deposit surplus food for use by others. The fridge is located at Cathays Community Centre in Cardiff.

== Structure and rationale ==
The festival was founded in 2004 by the Cowbridge Charter Trust, a registered charity, as part of its 750-year celebrations. The Trust was formed in 2003 with support from over 200 patrons in order to celebrate 750 years since the granting of the first ancient borough charter on 13 March 1254 by Richard de Clare, 6th Earl of Gloucester and Lord of Glamorgan. The festival is run by a private company limited by guarantee.
