= Neath Food and Drink Festival =

Annual food festival in South Wales

- Dates: October
- Location: Neath
- Founded: 2009
- Founders: Neath Port Talbot County Borough Council
- Attendance: 60,000 (2018)
- Website: http://www.npt.gov.uk/neathfoodfestival

Neath Food and Drink Festival is an annual food festival held in Neath, South Wales.

== Overview ==
The festival helps to celebrate Welsh cuisine by promoting and selling locally sourced produce. It is held over 3 days during October.

The festival was established in 2009 and was extended from two days to three days in 2015; commencing on Friday and finishing on Sunday. There are over 80 stalls where local cafes, restaurants and companies present their products to a wider audience.

The festival is located in the centre of the historic market town of Neath and promoted local food and drink businesses, encourages people from the area to shop locally, and educates visitors on the benefits of reducing food miles. The event has been praised for the positive economic benefits that it brings to Neath by increasing footfall in the town centre. In 2018 it had 60,000 visitors.

== Events ==
Events include cookery demonstrations featuring local chefs, guided foraging walks, cask ale tasting and cookery workshops. Previous years have included a street food zone in Angel Square with hay bales to sit on, a Champagne Tent in the grounds of St Thomas’ Church and a Real Ale Hall in the Old Town Hall. Local businesses provide live music and themed menus at venues in the town centre.

== Structure and Economic impact ==
The festival is organised by the Regeneration and Economic Development team of Neath Port Talbot County Borough Council and is supported by local businesses and community organisations.

A total of 62 artisan traders attended the festival in 2018, of which 77% were from Wales, and 18% were new businesses trading for less than two years.

== See also ==
- Neath
