= Monmouthshire Food Festival =

Former food festival in Wales

- Location: Caldicot Castle
- Founded: 2015 (ended in 2018)
- Website: monmouthshirefoodfestival.co.uk

Monmouthshire Food Festival was an annual food festival held in Caldicot Castle in Monmouthshire

== Overview ==
The festival was established in 2015 and took place in May and October. There was an entry fee. The festival ceased operations in 2018.

The festival had a theatre, market and children’s quarter: The Look and Learn Theatre featured master classes, food tasting and demonstrations on food and drinks.

The Theatre allowed visitors to meet producers of local food and drink and watch local chefs and cooks prepare different dishes.

Local chefs appearing included Chris Harrod of The Whitebrook, a Michelin starred chef from Monmouthshire, and Colin Carter, head chef of the Piercefield near Chepstow and winner of the Brains Chef of the year in 2014.

The Producers Market had over 50 stalls and was a market where local and Welsh producers sold food and drink. The Children’s Area was an area for children and includes cookery classes and lessons on healthy eating.

The festival worked with Guide Dogs for the Blind Association, Wales to let people find out more about guide dogs and the work of the organisation. Talks and cookery demonstrations used aids available to blind and partially sighted people to show how they prepare meals.

== See also ==
- Cuisine of Wales
