= Abergavenny Food Festival =

Food festival in Wales

- Genre: Celebration of food and food culture
- Dates: 18–19 September 2021 (3rd weekend in September)
- Locations: Abergavenny, Wales
- Founded: 1999
- Founders: Chris Wardle & Martin Orbach
- Attendance: +35,000
- Patrons: Franco Taruschio, Mr Alun Griffiths
- Website: http://www.abergavennyfoodfestival.com

The Abergavenny Food Festival is an annual food festival which takes place in the town of Abergavenny in Wales each September.

It was listed as 1 of 50 Best Summer Festivals by The Independent newspaper.

== History ==
The festival was founded in 1999, by two local farmers, Chris Wardle and Martin Orbach, in the aftermath of the BSE crisis.

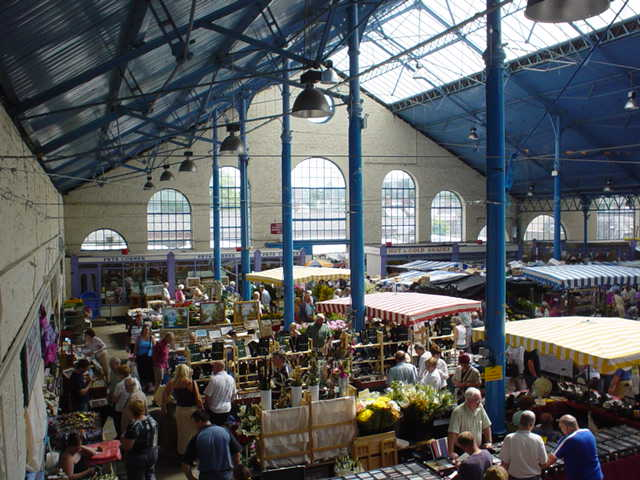
Market Hall, Abergavenny

"Abergavenny is to food as Cannes is to film – an annual festival for spotting rising stars in Britain's artisan food firmament"

— The Guardian

The 2019 festival was attended by over 35,000 people.

No festival is planned in 2020.

Over the years the festivals celebrity guests have included: Valentine Warner, Tom Parker Bowles, Mitch Tonks, Michael Winner, Matt Tebbutt, Mark Hix, Marguerite Patten OBE, Levi Roots, Keith Floyd, John Burton Race, Valentine Warner, Jay Rayner, Pete Brown, Jason Atherton, Henry Dimbleby, George Alagiah, Franco Taruschio, Fergus Henderson, Christophe Langree, Antonio Carluccio, Anthony Bourdain, Allegra McEvedy, Jose Pizarro, Alex James, Clarissa Dickson Wright, Fergus Henderson, Hugh Fearnley-Whittingstall, Asma Khan,

== Organisation ==
The festival is a non-profit organisation with an unpaid Board of Directors and small core team of year-round part-time staff. The current Chief Executive is Kim Waters, previously the Chairman. The Festival is additionally supported by organisations and individuals in both the public and private sectors.

== Overview of Festival (1999–2019, 2021–) ==
The planning for the first festival started in 1998. Run by volunteers it was helped by the then 'three towns adviser' of Monmouth, Chepstow & Abergavenny and the Monmouthshire food initiative officer. 39 local food and drink producers exhibited their wares in the Market Hall.

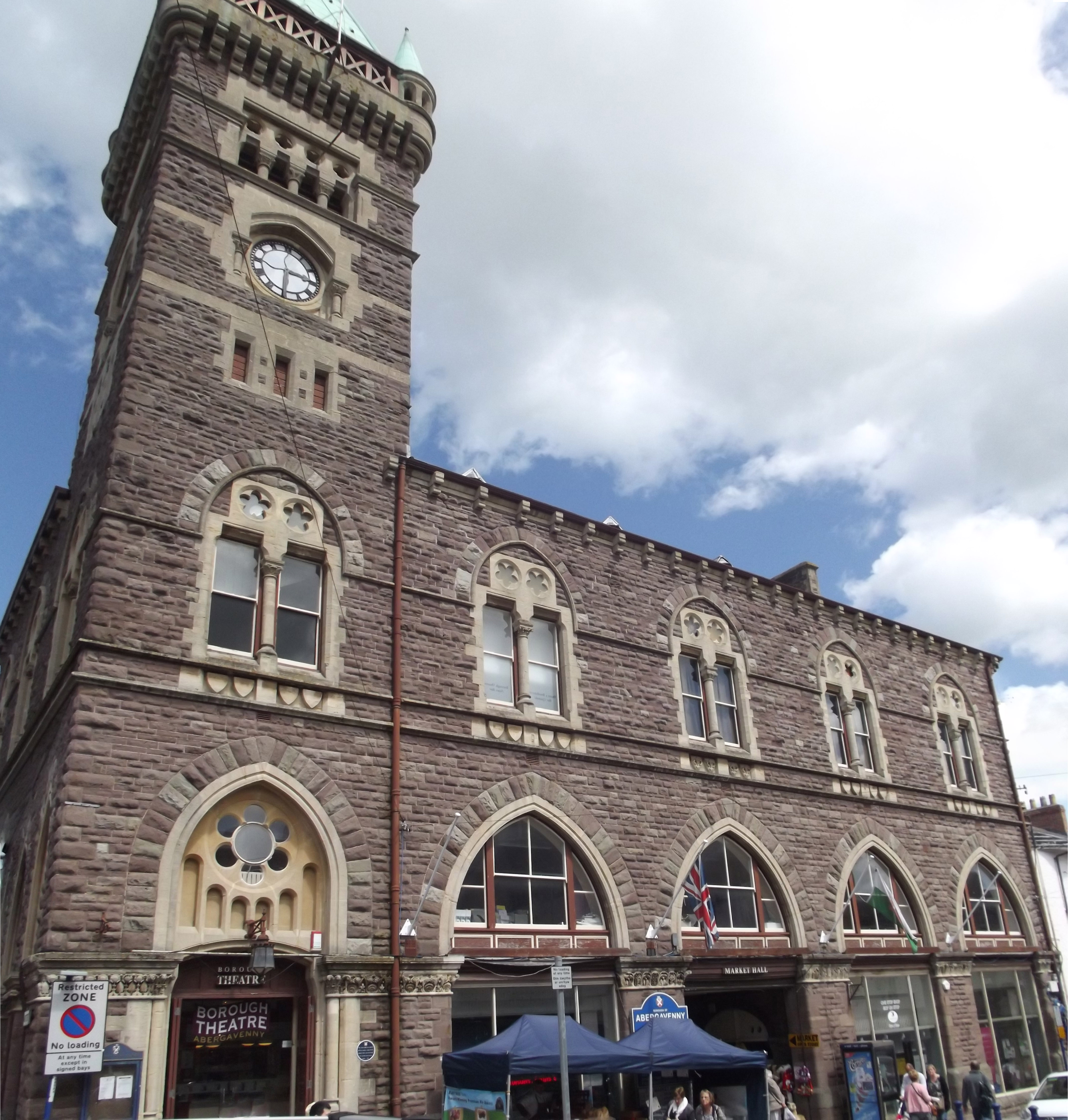
Market Hall, Abergavenny

The first programme was a double sided single fold card. There were 2 talks (Attended by 234 people) in the Borough Theatre Marguerite Patten and Franco & Ann Taruschio and, in the evening, Martyn Lewis chaired a debate about GM Foods (Attendance 91).

The Community Banquet (now called the 'Festival Fanfare', also previously referred to as the 'Market Hop' country supper and 'Twmpath'. – On Saturday evening 23 October 1999, the Market Hall hosted 180 people at trestle tables for dinner, punctuated by interludes of song and speech.

Other events included Farm Walks, a Marcher Day apple exhibition, guided tour of Abergavenny Museum, and 'Revolting Rhymes' an exhibition of Children's Verse in Abergavenny Library.

The Abergavenny Market Hall was a key venue and the festival worked with the town hall staff (many of whom are still involved today).

Funding: £15,500 came from a variety of sources. A further £1,800 was raised from private sponsors and in addition the festival made £4,295 from the sale of tickets to events and stall holders etc. Any profits are used to help finance future festivals.

== 2012–2015 ==
Over the years the festival has grown to become the National Tourism Awards "Best Event in Wales" 2013/14 and Finalist of the "Best Event in Wales ( Large)" 2015 and one of the leading food events in the UK, attracting visitors from all over the country and from abroad. The event now comprises:

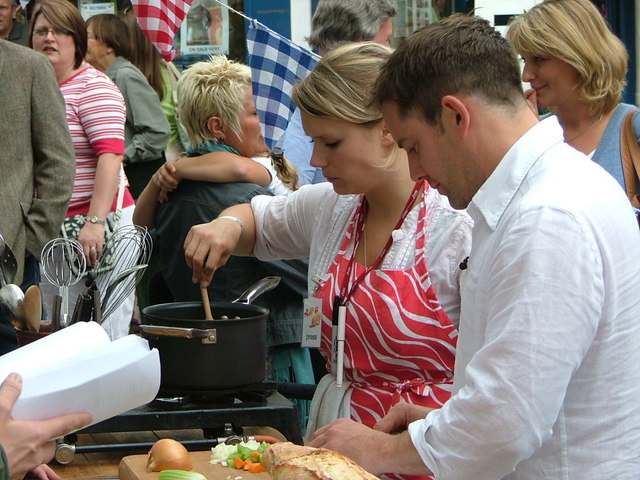
Abergavenny Food Festival

- Around 220 stalls spread across several indoor sites in the centre of Abergavenny and throughout central streets.
- Around 50 individually ticketed events: Master Classes, Tutored Tastings, Talks, Forays and Debates.
- Children's Food Academy at The Castle (family-friendly venue) – featuring interactive workshops for all ages.
- 'Rude Health' Speakers Corner: featuring celebrity guests.
- Rolling programme of Chef Dems in the Market Hall and in the Fish Market at The Priory Centre featuring the Restaurant Tasters at St Michael's Centre where chefs and restaurateurs from across Wales cook their signature dishes.
- Party at The Castle: An evening of music and food – capacity: 1,000.

== The Festival Debates (1999-) ==
1999 – "GMO's Do we need them?" chaired by BBC Broadcaster Martyn Lewis (Attendance 91) • 2000 – "Organic Food, Hope or Hype?" chaired by BBC Broadcaster Martyn Lewis (Attendance 89) • 2001 – "Beyond Fast Food? A Menu for the 21st Century" Produced in association with the BBC Radio 4 Food Programme and • 2013 – "Do we still need the High Street?" • 2002 – "Today's meat culture is Unsafe, Unsavoury and Unsustainable" chaired by Sheila Dillon • 2012 – "Do we still need the High Street?"• 2013 – "Food or wildlife- are we striking the right balance?" chaired by Sarah Dickens, BBC Wales • 2014 – "Is healthy eating making us ill?" Chaired by Nick Barnard of Rude Health

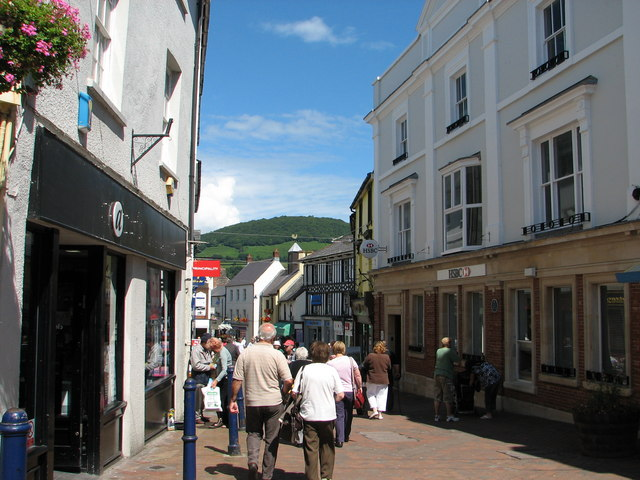
Frogmore Street, Abergavenny

== The Festival Conferences (2007-) ==
2007 – "Food Festivals – fads for affluent foodies or can have a real impact on local food culture" chaired by Sheila Dillon, presenter of BBC Radio 4's The Food Programme • 2008 – "Developing Regional & Local Food Tourism in the UK" • 2009 – The Big Food Debate. "Sustainable Food – The Debate over Greening the Food Chain – from Policy to Plate" Covered by The Food Programme on BBC Radio 4. • 2010 – "Food Festivals: The Next Generation" • 2011 – "Changing Attitudes to Local Food" • 2012 – "Food in a Recession"

== See also ==
- Welsh cuisine
- Cuisine of Monmouthshire
