= List of restaurants in Wales =

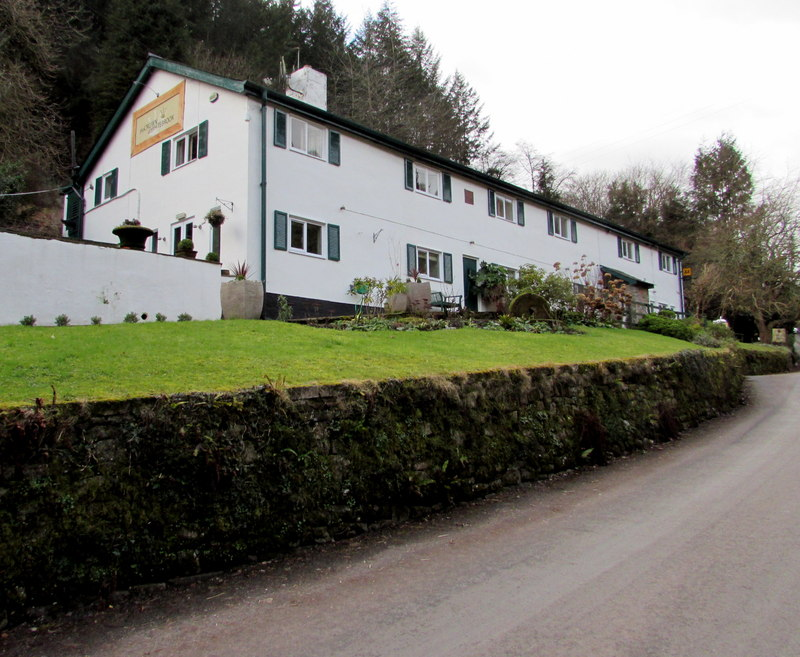
The Crown at Whitebrook, Monmouthshire

This is a list of notable restaurants in Wales. The number of restaurants has significantly increased since the 1960s, when the country had very few notable places to eat out. Today, Wales is no longer considered a "gastronomic desert"; there are six Michelin starred restaurants within the country. Other award systems from TripAdvisor and AA have included Welsh restaurants in their lists. The most significant increase in restaurants has been at the high-end, but there has been growth and improvement in quality across all the whole range of Welsh eateries.

Many Welsh restaurants attempt to showcase their "Welshness", but few include historic Welsh dishes besides cawl. Instead, they showcase their Welsh ingredients, creating new dishes from them. There has also been a rise in Asian cuisine in Wales, especially that of Indian, Chinese, Thai, Indonesian and Japanese, with a preference for spicier foods.

== Anglesey ==
- Sosban and The Old Butchers, Menai Bridge
  Previously a butchers shop and converted into a restaurant which is known for having no menus and so relies on the choice of the chef, Stephen Stevens. It has three AA rosettes rating. Earned its first Michelin star in 2016.

== Cardiff ==
- The Clink, Cardiff
  Based within Prison ground this restaurant was owned by the Clink Charity. It opened in 2012 and employed 30 full-time staff who are inmates at the prison, under the supervision of head chef Mike Arnopp. The Clink was rated 10th on TripAdvisor's Travellers' Choice Favourite Fine Dining Restaurants UK 2015. The Clink closed permanently in late 2022.

== Ceredigion ==
- Ynyshir, Eglwys Fach
  Ynyshir is run by Chef Patron Gareth Ward and his partner Amelia Eiriksson. It has a five AA rosette award the first and only ever in Wales and holds 2 Michelin star and was named the 12th Best Restaurant in the UK and highest placed in Wales in the 2018 Good Food Guide.

== Conwy ==
- Kinmel Arms, Abergele
  17th century inn with an AA two rosette standard and 2015 AA award for Welsh pub of the year It has also been awarded the TripAdvisor Certificate of Excellence and was listed in the Lonely Planet guide to Europe's 50 best 'secret spot' locations in 2015
- The Old Rectory Country House, Glan Conwy
  16th century, Georgian, grade II listed building It has previously held a Michelin star.

== Denbighshire ==
- Tyddyn Llan at Llandrillo
  Forming part of the hotel, the restaurant has been given a Michelin star under Bryan Webb as head chef. It has also been presented with Wine List of The Year Award 2016 from Good Food Guide, and the AA wine award

== Gwynedd ==
- Pete's Eats Cafe, Llanberis
  Used prominently by walkers and hikers, this cafe has won the Best Cafe in Wales in the 2016 People's Choice Awards and the Best Walkers' Cafe 2015. It serves basic food such as "chip butties" and "pint mugs of tea"
- Plas Bodegroes, Pwllheli
  Grade II listed Georgian house that has previously held a Michelin star.

== Monmouthshire ==
- The Whitebrook, Whitebrook
  Formerly known as "The Crown at Whitebrook" and the inn dates back to the 17th century. It has a Michelin star under chef Chris Harrod and three AA Rosettes.
- The Walnut Tree, Abergavenny
  Opened in early 1960s and since then has featured on Ramsay's Kitchen Nightmares and held Michelin stars. The Walnut Tree is now under the direction of head chef, Shaun Hill and the restaurant has since won Great Britain's Restaurant of the Year award, Wales category at the annual National Restaurant Awards 2015, has a Michelin star and three AA rosettes.
- The Bell, at Skenfrith has been listed among Britain’s best country pub/restaurants by Condé Nast Traveller, Time Out and The Times. The pub's hotel rooms won a César award from the Good Hotel Guide in 2021.

== Pembrokeshire ==
- Cnapan Hotel, Newport
  Grade II listed Georgian townhouse serving Welsh cuisine.
- The Grove, Narberth
  Set in an 18th-century mansion it was awarded four Red Stars and a triple AA rosette
- Coast Saundersfoot, Saundersfoot
  Based on a coast of Pembrokeshire this beachside restaurant is headed by chef Will Holland. It was awarded the AA Welsh restaurant of the year in 2014.

== Powys ==
- The Checkers, Montgomery
  18th century coaching inn, the Checkers, offers a "set taster menu" and has had a Michelin star since 2012.
- The Felin Fach Griffin, Brecon
  Restaurant and bar which uses local produce has been given the Bib Gourmand in Wales from the Red Michelin Guide, Inn of the Year for 2013 by The Good Pub Guide and has been featured in the Good Food Guide, Hardens and the Good Hotel Guide.
- Carlton Riverside, Llanwrtyd Wells
  Overlooking the Irfon river the Carlton Riverside, opened in 1991, is run by head chef, Mary Ann Gilchrist. It has previously had a Michelin star and three AA rosettes.
- Llangoed Hall, Brecon
  Grade II listed building with features retained from the original designs from the 17th century. It has an AA three rosette award and has previously had a Michelin star.

== Vale of Glamorgan ==
- Restaurant James Sommerin, Penarth
  Named after its owner and head chef, James Sommerin, it was "ranked 24 in the UK in the Good Food Guide 2016 – the highest placed restaurant in Wales and was awarded three AA rosettes." Permanently closed in July 2020.
- Home, Penarth
  Opened by James Sommerin in 2021, the restaurant gained a Michelin Star in 2022.

== See also ==
- List of Michelin-starred restaurants in Wales
- Welsh cuisine
