= List of Michelin-starred restaurants in Wales =

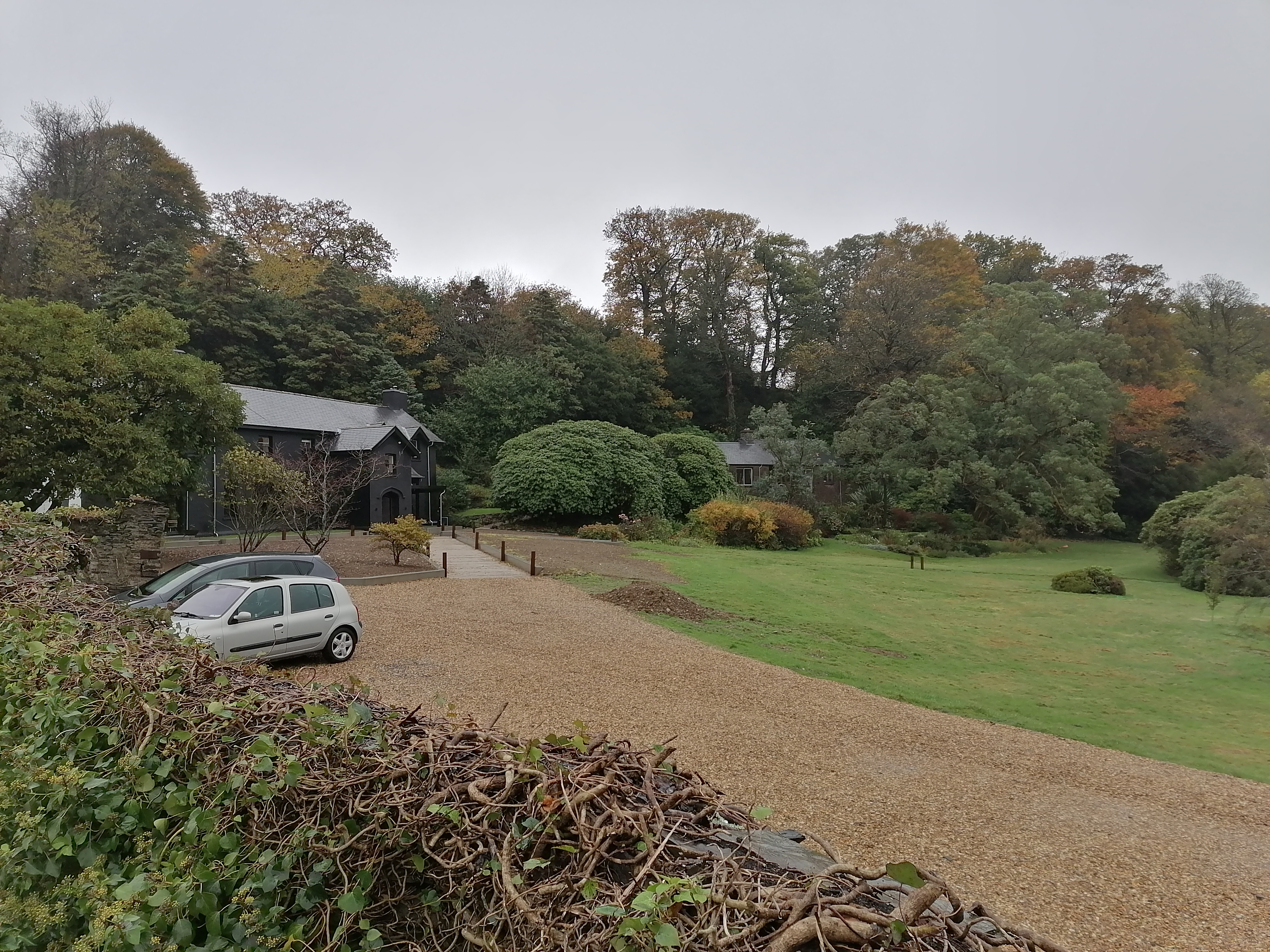
Entrance to Ynyshir, the highest starred restaurant in Wales.

As of the 2026 Michelin Guide, there are seven restaurants in Wales with a Michelin-star rating.

The Michelin Guides have been published by the French tire company Michelin since 1900. They were designed as a guide to tell drivers about eateries they recommended to visit and to subtly sponsor their tires, by encouraging drivers to use their cars more and therefore need to replace the tires as they wore out. Over time, the stars that were given out became more valuable.

Multiple anonymous Michelin inspectors visit the restaurants several times. They rate the restaurants on five criteria: "quality of products", "mastery of flavor and cooking techniques", "the personality of the chef represented in the dining experience", "value for money", and "consistency between inspectors' visits". Inspectors have at least ten years of expertise and create a list of popular restaurants supported by media reports, reviews, and diner popularity. If they reach a consensus, Michelin awards restaurants from one to three stars based on its evaluation methodology: one star means "high-quality cooking, worth a stop", two stars signify "excellent cooking, worth a detour", and three stars denote "exceptional cuisine, worth a special journey". The stars are not permanent and restaurants are constantly re-evaluated. If the criteria are not met, the restaurant will lose its stars.

Plas Bodegroes was the first Michelin-starred restaurant in Wales, it was also awarded for the longest time, 14 years, and was awarded Welsh Restaurant of the Year. In 2025, the first restaurant in the capital city, Cardiff, was awarded, Gorse. Ynyshir is the restaurant with the most stars in the nation. Wales is reviewed with the rest of Great Britain and Ireland.

== 2021–2026 lists ==
Key
1 Michelin star	One Michelin star
2 Michelin stars	Two Michelin stars
—	The restaurant did not receive a star that year
Closed	The restaurant is no longer open

Michelin-starred restaurants
Name	Location		Cuisine	2021	2022	2023	2024	2025	2026
Name	Town	County	Cuisine	2021	2022	2023	2024	2025	2026
Beach House	Oxwich	Swansea	Modern	1 Michelin star	1 Michelin star	1 Michelin star	1 Michelin star	1 Michelin star	1 Michelin star
Gorse	Cardiff	Cardiff	Welsh	—	—	—	—	1 Michelin star	1 Michelin star
Home	Penarth	Vale of Glamorgan	Modern	—	1 Michelin star	1 Michelin star	1 Michelin star	1 Michelin star	1 Michelin star
Restaurant James Sommerin	Penarth	Vale of Glamorgan	British	Closed					
Sosban & The Old Butchers	Menai Bridge	Anglesey	Modern	1 Michelin star	1 Michelin star	1 Michelin star	1 Michelin star	1 Michelin star	1 Michelin star
SY23	Aberystwyth	Ceredigion	Contemporary	—	1 Michelin star	1 Michelin star	Closed		
The Whitebrook	Whitebrook	Monmouthshire	British	1 Michelin star	1 Michelin star	1 Michelin star	1 Michelin star	1 Michelin star	1 Michelin star
Walnut Tree	Llanddewi Skirrid	Monmouthshire	British	1 Michelin star	1 Michelin star	1 Michelin star	1 Michelin star	1 Michelin star	1 Michelin star
Ynyshir	Eglwys Fach	Ceredigion	Japanese	1 Michelin star	2 Michelin stars	2 Michelin stars	2 Michelin stars	2 Michelin stars	2 Michelin stars
Reference									

== 2011–2020 lists ==
Key
1 Michelin star	One Michelin star
—	The restaurant did not receive a star that year

Michelin-starred restaurants
Name	Cuisine	Location	2011	2012	2013	2014	2015	2016	2017	2018	2019	2020
Beach House	Contemporary	Oxwich	—	—	—	—	—	—	—	—	—	1 Michelin star
Restaurant James Sommerin	British	Penarth	—	—	—	—	—	—	1 Michelin star	1 Michelin star	1 Michelin star	1 Michelin star
Sosban & The Old Butchers	Contemporary	Menai Bridge	—	—	—	—	—	—	1 Michelin star	1 Michelin star	1 Michelin star	1 Michelin star
The Checkers	French	Montgomery	—	1 Michelin star	1 Michelin star	1 Michelin star	1 Michelin star	1 Michelin star	1 Michelin star	1 Michelin star	1 Michelin star	—
The Whitebrook	British	Whitebrook	1 Michelin star	1 Michelin star	1 Michelin star	—	1 Michelin star	1 Michelin star	1 Michelin star	1 Michelin star	1 Michelin star	1 Michelin star
Tyddyn Llan	Welsh	Llandrillo|	1 Michelin star	1 Michelin star	1 Michelin star	1 Michelin star	1 Michelin star	1 Michelin star	1 Michelin star	1 Michelin star	1 Michelin star	—
Walnut Tree	British	Llanddewi Skirrid	1 Michelin star	1 Michelin star	1 Michelin star	1 Michelin star	1 Michelin star	1 Michelin star	1 Michelin star	1 Michelin star	1 Michelin star	1 Michelin star
Ynyshir	Japanese	Eglwys Fach	1 Michelin star	—	—	—	—	1 Michelin star	1 Michelin star	1 Michelin star	1 Michelin star	1 Michelin star
Reference												

== 2001–2010 lists ==
Key
1 Michelin star	One Michelin star
—	The restaurant did not receive a star that year

Michelin-starred restaurants
Name	Cuisine	Location	2001	2002	2003	2004	2005	2006	2007	2008	2009	2010
Carlton House		Llanwrtyd Wells	—	1 Michelin star	1 Michelin star	1 Michelin star	—	—	—	—	—	—
Llangoed Hall		Llyswen	1 Michelin star	—	—	—	—	—	—	—	—	—
Old Rectory Country House		Conwy	1 Michelin star	1 Michelin star	—	—	—	—	—	—	—	—
Plas Bodegroes		Pwllheli	—	1 Michelin star	1 Michelin star	1 Michelin star	1 Michelin star	1 Michelin star	1 Michelin star	1 Michelin star	—	—
The Whitebrook	British	Whitebrook	—	—	—	—	—	—	1 Michelin star	1 Michelin star	1 Michelin star	1 Michelin star
Tyddyn Llan	Welsh	Llandrillo	—	—	—	—	—	—	—	—	—	1 Michelin star
Walnut Tree	British	Llanddewi Skirrid	—	1 Michelin star	1 Michelin star	—	—	—	—	—	—	1 Michelin star
Ynyshir	Japanese	Eglwys Fach	—	1 Michelin star	1 Michelin star	—	—	1 Michelin star	—	—	—	1 Michelin star
Reference												

== 1991–2000 lists ==
Key
1 Michelin star	One Michelin star
—	The restaurant did not receive a star that year

Michelin-starred restaurants
Name	Cuisine	Location	1991	1992	1993	1994	1995	1996	1997	1998	1999	2000
Llangoed Hall		Llyswen	—	—	—	—	—	1 Michelin star	1 Michelin star	1 Michelin star	1 Michelin star	1 Michelin star
Old Rectory Country House		Conwy	—	—	—	—	—	—	—	—	—	1 Michelin star
Plas Bodegroes		Pwllheli	1 Michelin star	1 Michelin star	1 Michelin star	1 Michelin star	1 Michelin star	1 Michelin star	1 Michelin star	—	—	—
Reference												

== See also ==
- List of restaurants in Wales
- List of Michelin 3-star restaurants in the United Kingdom
- List of Michelin-starred restaurants in England
- List of Michelin-starred restaurants in Greater London
- List of Michelin-starred restaurants in Northern Ireland
- List of Michelin-starred restaurants in Scotland
- List of Michelin-starred restaurants in Ireland
- Lists of restaurants
