= San Filippo Benizi, Montefano =

Church in Montefano, Italy

Coordinates: 43°24′42″N 13°26′16″E

San Filippo Benizi is a Roman Catholic, Baroque style church in Montefano, Province of Macerata, region of Marche, Italy. The church is dedicated to St Philip Benizi (1233-1285), credited with the revival of the Superior of the Order of the Servants of Mary.

== History ==
The Servites moved a convent to Montefano in 1673 after closing another near Ginestreto. After the canonization of St Philip in 1671, the present brick church was built in 1694 to replace an ancient church. Consecration took place in 1703. The female convent was transiently suppressed during 1880-1897.

The façade has two stories, flanked by pilasters, with a triangular pediment over the main door, and a rounded one over a superior window. A number of additions and ornaments were added over the next centuries. The chapel of our Lady of Sorrows was decorated by Tibalducci, a painter from Recanati. The oval portraits were painted by Nazzareno Aquilanti.

The church and convent face a small piazza in the town. Adjacent to the church is a convent of the Servite order that also houses the Centro Studi Biblici Giovanni Vannucci, created in 1995 for biblical studies. The library houses nearly 10 thousand volumes.
