= Stephen Terry =

Welsh chef

Stephen Terry is a chef from Wales and the owner of The Hardwick Restaurant in Abergavenny, Wales.

== Career ==
Terry trained under Marco Pierre White at his kitchen "Harveys". He then went into business with Francesco Mattioli and bought The Walnut Tree in Abergavenny (previously run by Italian celebrity chef Franco Taruschio) and gained a Michelin star there. They subsequently parted company, with Mattioli remaining at the Walnut Tree.

Terry has appeared on the BBC programme representing Wales in Great British Menu. He won in the first round in 2008 against Angela Hartnett, and cooked the fish course at the final banquet. In the 2009 series, he was beaten by James Sommerin in the first round.

Terry bought The Hardwick, which was managed by his wife, Joanne. In October 2023, they announced the closure of the restaurant, following a court case at which a manager at the Hardwick was convicted of embezzling some £150,000 from the business.
