= The Grove, Narberth =

Coordinates: 51.7826°N 4.7654°W

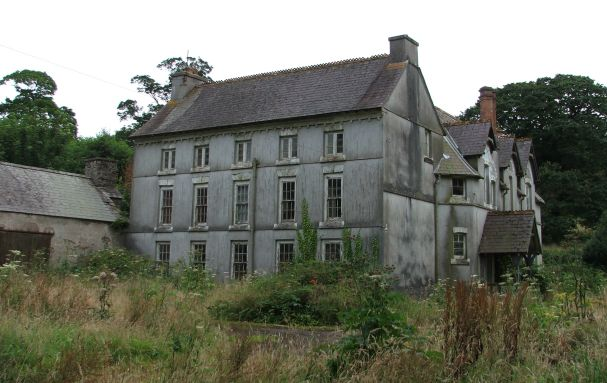
The Grove (2005) near Templeton

The Grove is a Grade II listed building of historical significance located south of Narberth, Pembrokeshire. It was built by Daniel Poyer in about 1680 shortly after he inherited the property from his father. The house remained in the Poyer family for the next two centuries. Today The Grove is a hotel and restaurant. It caters for special events particularly weddings.

== The Poyer family ==
The site was occupied by a family of tanners, the Poyers, with Henry Poyer appearing in the hearth tax returns in 1670. However, the current house is believed to have been built by his son, Daniel Poyer, towards the end of the century.

== The Callen family ==
In 1808 the house came into the ownership, through marriage, of the Callen family. Charles Poyer-Callen was occupant of the house in 1848 when he passed the house to his nephew, John Poyer Hugh Charles Poyer-Callen (1836-1866), a local magistrate and a captain in the 71st Highlanders. He was the son of Charles's brother Daniel Poyer Callen.

== The Lewis family ==
The house came into the hands of the Lewis family by marriage. John Lennox Griffith Poyer Lewis (1819-1886) was born in 1819. His father was John Lewis of Henllan in Pembrokeshire and his mother was Eliza Callen sister of Charles Poyer Callen. He was educated at Bromsgrove School and became a barrister. His father died in 1834 and when he came of age he inherited Henllan. In 1857 he married his cousin Katherine Callen but they had no children. In 1874 he commissioned the notable architect John Pollard Seddon to make alterations to the house. This work extended the original Jacobean L-shaped house to provide a large hallway, new staircase, lounge, master bedroom and a library on the first floor landing.

When he died in 1886 his famous brother Bishop Richard Lewis (1821-1905) inherited his estates including the Grove. The properties then descended down the male line until they came to Sir Wilfred Lewis of Henllan who died in 1950.

== Hotel ==
By 2007 the building was derelict, acquired by new owners Neil Kedward and Zoe Agar, who restored it over the following years, opening a hotel which became Welsh Hotel of the Year.
