= Bailey Park, Abergavenny =

Urban park in Abergavenny, Wales

Bailey Park
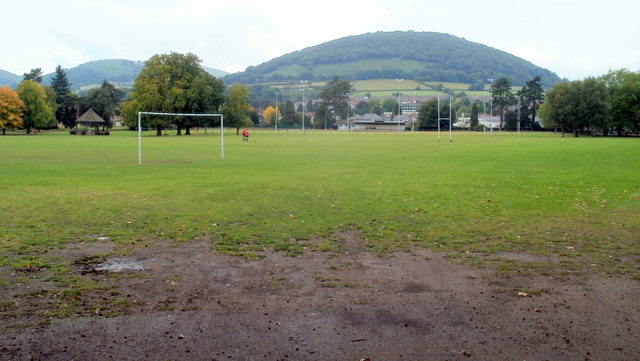
- Abergavenny RFC rugby pitches in Bailey Park

- Location within Monmouthshire
- Interactive map of Bailey Park
- Type: Public park
- Location: Abergavenny, Monmouthshire, Wales
- Coordinates: 51.8262502°N 3.0156548°W
- Area: 8 ha (20 acres)
- Created: 1884
- Operator: Monmouthshire County Council
- Status: Open year round
- Website

Cadw/ICOMOS Register of Parks and Gardens of Special Historic Interest in Wales
- Official name: Bailey Park
- Designated: 1 February 2022
- Reference no.: PGW(Gt)60(MON)
- Listing: Grade II

Listed Building – Grade II
- Official name: Structure of gates, gatepiers and attached walls with railings to main entrance to Bailey Park
- Designated: 28 April 2003
- Reference no.: 80881

Bailey Park is an urban park in the town of Abergavenny, in Monmouthshire Wales. It was founded in 1884 on land donated by Crawshay Bailey, Junior. The park is home to Abergavenny Rugby Football Club. In the 20th century, the park had a lido, but this was later decommissioned and demolished. In the early 21st century, a campaigning group was established to work for its reinstatement. Bailey Park is registered Grade II on the Register of Parks and Gardens of Special Historic Interest in Wales. The entrance gates, gate piers, walls and railings on the Hereford Road are listed at Grade II. The park is managed by Monmouthshire County Council.

== History and description ==
Crawshay Bailey, Junior (1841-1887), son and heir of the ironmaster Crawshay Bailey of Cyfarthfa Castle, Merthyr Tydfil, inherited some 12,000 acres (49 km^{2}) of land in Wales on his father's death in 1872. (Note: Crawshay Bailey Jr. was illegitimate, his mother being Sarah Baker, one of his father's servants. He died in Dublin at the age of 46, having become estranged from his family and living the life of a recluse. He is buried, next to his mother, at St David's Church, Llanddewi Skirrid.) Bailey Jr. displayed no interest in his father's commercial and industrial activities, instead using his inherited wealth to set himself up as a country gentleman. Establishing his own country seat at Maindiff, outside of Abergavenny, he became a considerable benefactor to the town, while developing a large landholding around Llantilio Pertholey and indulging in country sports, particularly foxhunting.

In 1883 Bailey leased 8 hectares of land known as Priory Fields, off the Hereford Road in Abergavenny, and laid out a public park. In 1894 the park was bought by the Improvement Commissioners, predecessors of Abergavenny Town Council, using money gifted by Bailey's heirs. The park was equipped with many of the facilities common to those established in the Victorian era, including a bandstand, bowling greens and greenhouses. In 1939 a lido was constructed but this was closed in 1996 due to concerns over operating and maintenance costs. The structure was later demolished. A campaigning group was established in around 2020 to campaign for the reconstruction of the lido and its reopening for public use, but the group announced its disbandment in late 2024.

The park is home to Abergavenny Rugby Football Club which was founded in 1875.

Bailey Park is listed at Grade II on the Register of Parks and Gardens of Special Historic Interest in Wales. The entrance gates, gate piers, walls and railings on the Hereford Road are Grade II listed structures. The park is managed by Monmouthshire County Council.

== Gallery ==
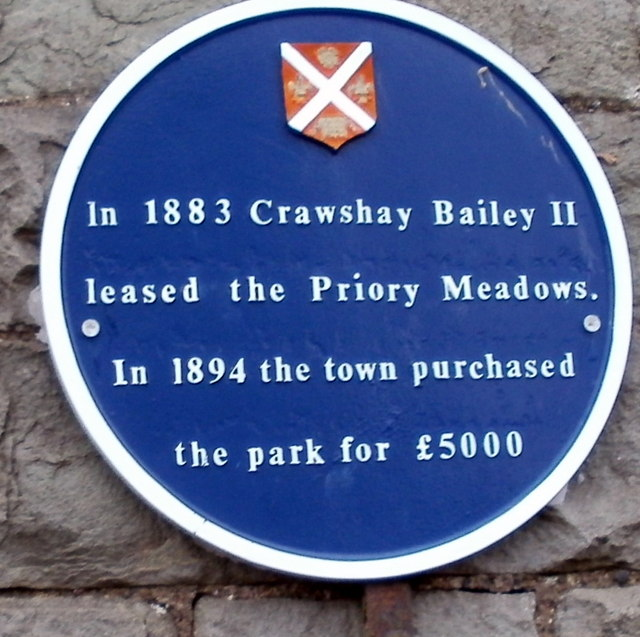
Blue plaque

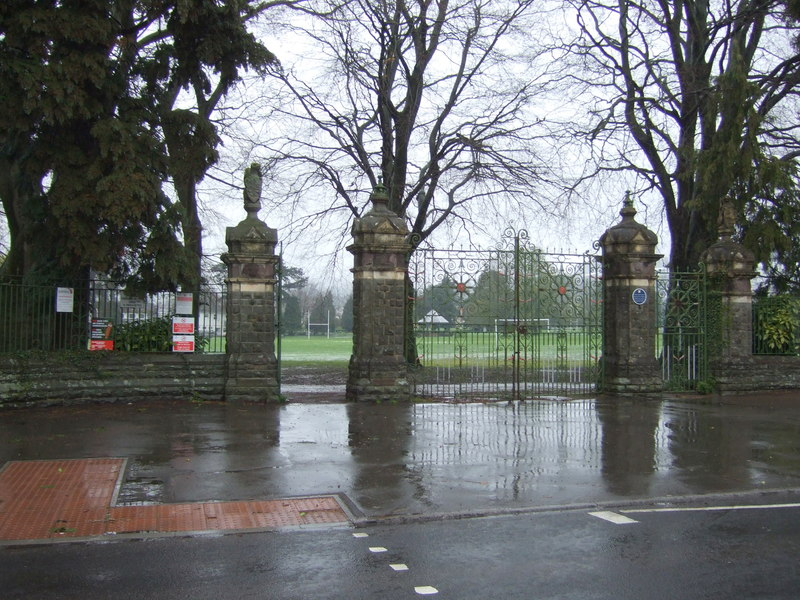
The Grade II listed gates

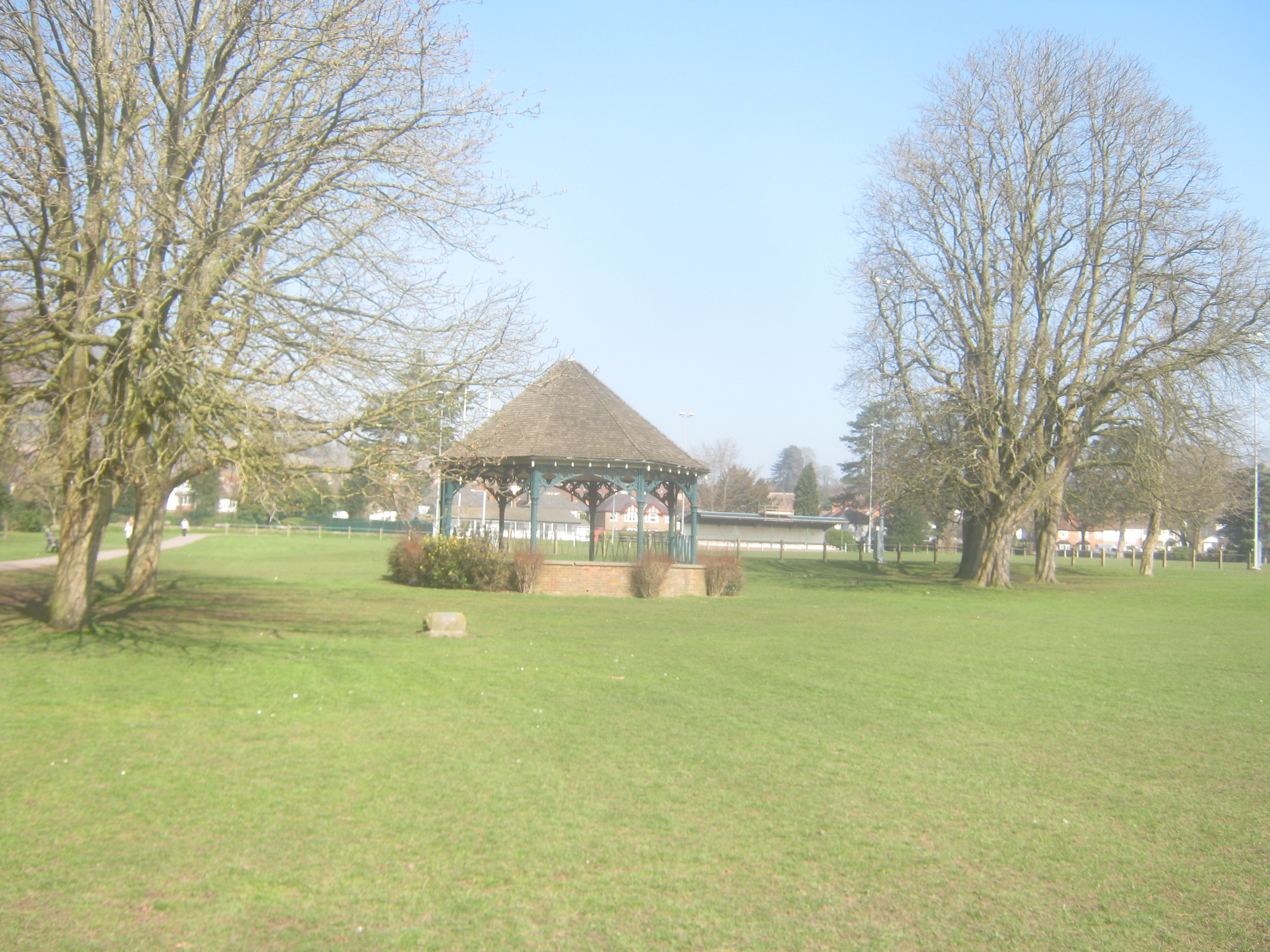
Bandstand

== Sources ==
- Morgan, Irena (2012). Abergavenny through Time. Stroud: Amberley Publishing. ISBN 978-1-445-62644-4.
