= Alfredo Lambertucci =

Italian architect (1928–1996)

- Born: 19 March 1928; Montecassiano, Province of Macerata, Kingdom of Italy
- Died: 10 April 1996 (aged 68); Rome, Italy
- Education: Academy of Fine Arts of Rome; Sapienza University of Rome
- Occupations: Architect, urban planner

Alfredo Lambertucci (19 March 1928 – 10 April 1996) was an Italian architect and urban planner.

== Life and career ==
Lambertucci was born in Montecassiano on 19 March 1928. He studied in Rome, first at the Academy of Fine Arts and then at the Faculty of Architecture, graduating in 1953. He remained closely tied to the university throughout his life, teaching continuously until his death in 1996.

He began his professional career in the early 1950s. His first major project was the parish church in Consalvi, Macerata (1953), followed by the award-winning Pharmacology Institute at the University of Rome (1955–59), designed with Claudio Dall'Olio. Throughout the 1950s and 1960s, he participated in numerous public architecture competitions, focusing especially on housing, education, and urban design.

Among his most significant works are: the INA-Casa housing projects (Rimini, 1956; Secondigliano, 1965; Ferrara, 1969–73); the Laterza Building in Bari (1958); the Macerata Courthouse (1967–71); the Vigne Nuove housing complex in Rome.

In the 1980s, he worked on urban renewal projects like the unbuilt housing block in Testaccio, and collaborated on the master plan for the Tor Vergata campus in Rome.

== Sources ==
- Pisana Posocco, ed. (2019). Alfredo Lambertucci 1928-1996. Costruire lo spazio. Macerata: Quodlibet.
- Sergio Polano; Marco Mulazzani, eds. (1991). Guida all'architettura italiana del Novecento. Milan: Electa. p. 586.
- Paolo Portoghesi, ed. (1969). Dizionario enciclopedico di architettura e urbanistica. Vol. III. Rome: Gangemi. p. 325.
- Rosa, Giancarlo (1987). "Opere recenti di Alfredo Lambertucci". Parametro. No. 162. Faenza. p. 15980.
- Spaini, Filippo (2004). "LAMBERTUCCI, Alfredo". Dizionario Biografico degli Italiani. Vol. 63. Istituto dell'Enciclopedia Italiana.
