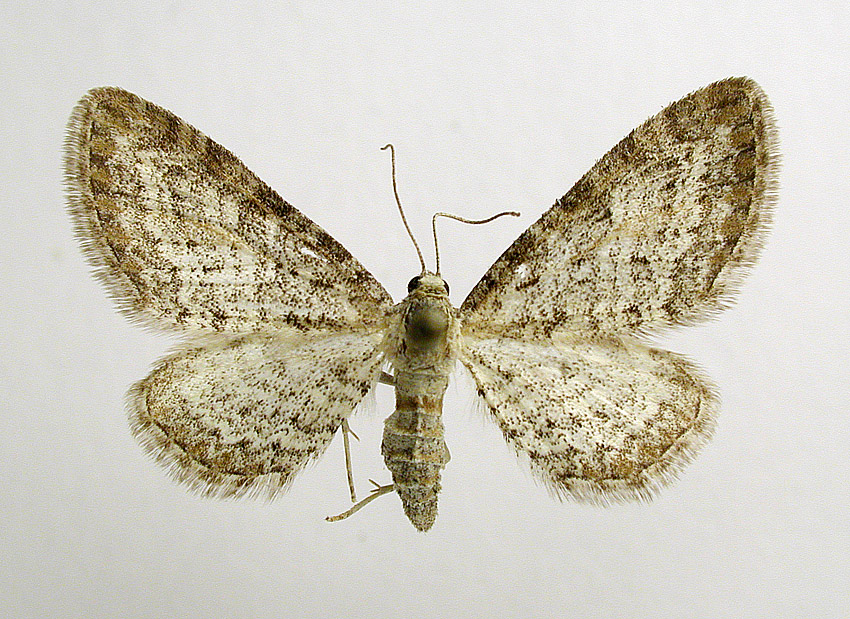

Scientific classification
- Kingdom: Animalia
- Phylum: Arthropoda
- Class: Insecta
- Order: Lepidoptera
- Family: Geometridae
- Genus: Eupithecia
- Species: E. subumbrata

Binomial name
- Eupithecia subumbrata (Denis & Schiffermüller, 1775)

Synonyms
- Geometra subumbrata Denis & Schiffermuller, 1775; Phalaena scabiosata Borkhausen, 1794; Eupithecia obrutaria Herrich-Schaffer, 1848; Eupithecia piperata Stephens, 1831

= Eupithecia subumbrata =

Shaded pug

Species of moth

Eupithecia subumbrata, the shaded pug, is a moth of the family Geometridae. The species was first described by Michael Denis and Ignaz Schiffermüller in 1775. It is found from Mongolia and the Altai Mountains through Siberia, central Asia, Asia Minor and Russia to western Europe and from central Scandinavia to the Mediterranean region.

The wingspan is 18–21 mm. The ground colour of the forewing is pale greyish-brown or white with an oval, dark spot in the middle and pale or darker greyish-brown transverse bands, but the markings are usually indistinct. The hind wing is dirty white, brown along the outer edge. This species has no striking field characteristics and one has to examine the genitals to determine it with certainty. The larva is long and thin, either light brown or green, with scattered, small, white warts. See also Prout

There is one generation per year with adults on wing from the beginning of May to August.

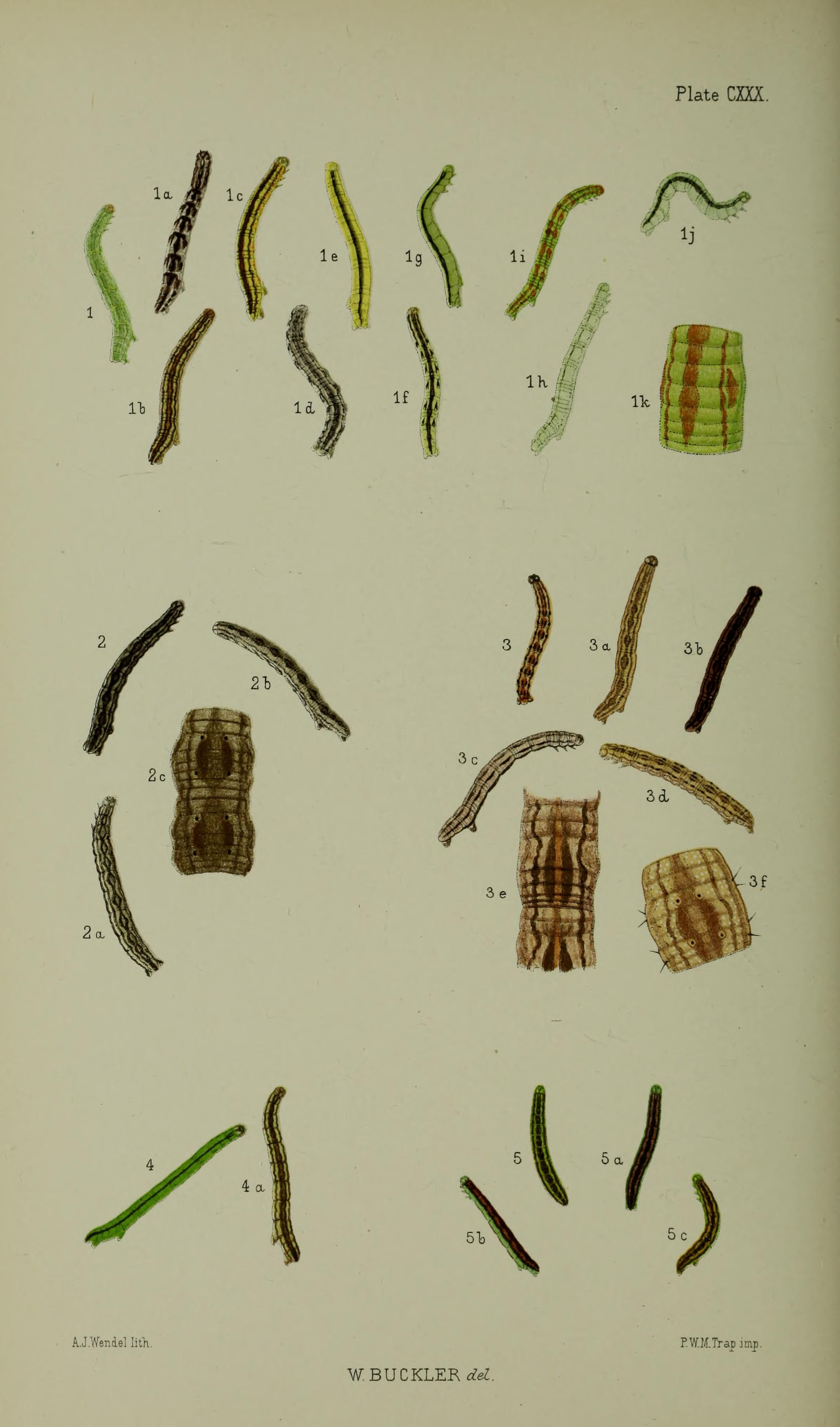
Figs 4,4a larvae after final moult

The larvae feed are polyphagous and feed on various plants, including Galium mollugo, Hypericum perforatum, Pimpinella, Senecio and Solidago species. Larvae can be found from July to September. It overwinters as a pupa.

== Subspecies ==
- Eupithecia subumbrata subumbrata
- Eupithecia subumbrata iliata Schutze, 1956 (Kazakhstan, Kyrghyzstan)
