= Macerata Courthouse =

Judiciary building in Macerata, Italy

- Interactive map of the Macerata Courthouse area

General information
- Type: Courthouse
- Architectural style: Brutalist
- Location: Macerata, Marche, Italy
- Coordinates: 43°17′42.5″N 13°26′59.8″E
- Construction started: 1967
- Completed: 1973
- Cost: 650 million lire

Design and construction
- Architect: Alfredo Lambertucci
- Structural engineer: Francesco Scuterini

The Macerata Courthouse (Palazzo di Giustizia, or Uffici giudiziari) is a judicial complex located on Via Pesaro in Macerata, Italy.

== History ==
The courthouse was designed by architect Alfredo Lambertucci in 1967 and built between 1967 and 1973. The project was developed in collaboration with architect Marone Marcelletti, while the structural design was carried out by engineer Francesco Scuterini. Construction was executed by the Pessina company of Rome, at a total cost of approximately 650 million lire.

It is located on the southern edge of the historic center, on an irregular, concave site that was, at the time, largely undeveloped and disconnected from the urban core. The project aimed to establish at least a visual connection with the city, anticipating future infrastructural links, some of which were later realized.

An expansion plan was drafted in 1991 but never executed. Although the surrounding area was eventually urbanized, the courthouse remains a defining element of the neighborhood and the city skyline, clearly expressing its public function and the period of its construction.

== Description ==
Due to the site's small size and uneven topography, the building was conceived as a vertically developed structure anchored on a base that bridges the two sides of the lot. Its height and mass establish a direct relationship with the historic city profile.

The architectural language is neo-brutalist. The design prioritizes functional clarity and spatial articulation, aligning with the principles of public architecture in the late 20th century.

Internally, the building is structured as a self-contained urban microcosm. A large covered central court serves as a distribution hub for the courtrooms and public spaces. Circulation paths include suspended walkways, stair towers, and elevators, all visibly expressed in the exterior composition. The result is a spatially complex and functionally legible structure that reflects "both the civic role and architectural ethos of its time".

The building was praised by Bruno Zevi as a landmark of 20th-century Italian architecture.

== Sources ==
- Ciccarelli, Lorenzo (2016). Guida all'architettura nelle Marche 1900-2015. Macerata: Quodlibet. pp. 264–265.
- Francesco Dal Co (1997). Storia dell'architettura Italiana. Il secondo Novecento (1945-1996). Milan: Electa. p. 169.
- Giorgio Muratore; Francesco Galofaro; Ettore Pellegrini, eds. (1988). Guida all'architettura moderna. Italia. Gli ultimi trent'anni. Bologna: Zanichelli. p. 300.
- Franchetti Pardo, Vittorio (1973). "Nuova sede degli uffici giudiziari di Macerata". L'Architettura. Cronache e storia. No. 217. Rome. pp. 358–374.
- Gorgo, Letizia (2019). "Il Palazzo di Giustizia di Macerata. La struttura della società come premessa di progetto". In Pisana Posocco (ed.). Alfredo Lambertucci 1928-1996. Costruire lo spazio. Macerata: Quodlibet.
- Sergio Polano; Marco Mulazzani, eds. (1991). Guida all'architettura italiana del Novecento. Milan: Electa. p. 383.
- Rosa, Giancarlo (1987). "Opere recenti di Alfredo Lambertucci". Parametro. No. 162. Faenza. p. 15980.
- Bruno Zevi, ed. (1979). Cronache di architettura. Vol. 16. Rome–Bari: Laterza. pp. 551–555.
