= Abergavenny RFC =

Welsh rugby union club, based in Abergavenny

(Wales) Abergavenny RFC
- Full name: Abergavenny Rugby Football Club
- Founded: 1877; 149 years ago
- Location: Abergavenny, Wales
- Ground: Bailey Park
- League: WRU Division One East
- 2019/20: 2nd
Team kit

Official website
- abergavenny.rfc.wales

Abergavenny Rugby Football Club is a Welsh rugby union club team based in Abergavenny. Today, Abergavenny RFC plays in the Welsh Rugby Union Division One East league and is a feeder club for the Newport Gwent Dragons.

The club runs sides from under 8's through to under 16's, a youth side, and two senior sides, a 1st XV and 'The Quins'. Club colours are claret and amber. Separate committees within the club oversee the Minis and Juniors and main club.

== Early history ==
Although there is mention of rugby being played in Abergavenny as far back 1867, the Abergavenny club was formed in 1875 through Faithful's Army and Navy Training College. In 1877 Abergavenny played their first match under rugby rules against Monmouth School. Although there are reports of Abergavenny playing some matches on the Castle Meadows their first permanent ground was Ysgyborwen Fields which forms the Pennypound end of Park Crescent. In later seasons the club moved to the council owned Bailey Park where the team plays to this day. Changing Rooms were built at the clubhouse in 1960.

== Home ground ==
The clubhouse sits in the top corner of Fairfield Car Park just north of the town centre off the A40 Brecon Road. The club backs onto the two rugby pitches at Bailey Park. The clubhouse was extended in 2004/05 to include new changing rooms, showers and physio room through a grant from the Sports Council of Wales in association with the Welsh Rugby Union. The club houses a ground floor lounge and a first floor function room, committee room and kitchen facility.

The rugby club grandstand in Bailey Park was built in 1999 and at that time had seating in from the old Cardiff Arms Park. It was officially opened by Sir Tasker Watkins President of the WRU. Over the years the stand has suffered much vandalism all the seating and later the Welsh slate roof has had to be removed for safety reasons due to vandalism. The roof has been replaced with steel sheeting. The project will take time and money is needed for new seating for supporters and also the stand needs vandal proof shutters to prevent its use to only rugby supporters.

During the 2010/2011 season new floodlights were erected following funding from the Millennium Stadium Charitable Trust, Monmouthshire County Council and a large donation from the Mini and Junior sections of the club raised through their successful annual Rugby Festival 'The Tournament' that takes place at Usk Showground each year. The lights cost in the region of £50K.

The Tournament is held each year on the May Day Bank holiday at the Usk showground. The 2010 festival of rugby is the largest in Wales and surpassed last years numbers with nearly 4300 players and over 170 teams represented by 56 clubs competing in all age groups from Under 7 to Under 16. For the third season we will also had a U15 Girls and a U18 Ladies tournament held on the Sunday during the Mini Day and a senior ladies 7-a-side on the Saturday. Over 20 pitches are used at times with matches from 10.30am until the closing award ceremony in the late afternoon / early evening.

The Tournament is played under the WRU Pathway rules for the various age groups. It is not a charitable event and the cost of the weekend falls on the Junior and Mini Sections of the club. Welsh international rugby players attend each year with Ian Gough and Ryan Jones attending the most. James Hook, Luke Charteris, Rhys Thomas and Hal Luscombe have appeared in previous years.

As of 2010 the tournament is in 8th season having grown from three teams in Bailey Park, Abergavenny in 2001. The event then moved to Raglan Sports Fields in 2002 until 2007 when it outgrew that site. It has been resident at the Usk Showgrounds until present.

For over 20 years at Easter the Mini section has forged a special bond with ROC Cholet, France. Alternative years the players from Cholet and Abergavenny are hosted as each visits the other and trips are arranged to show the players and families local sights and customs culminating in matches on the Sunday.

== Club honours ==
- 1994-95 Welsh League Division 6 East - Champions
- 2018-19 WRU Bowl - Winners

== Notable past players ==
See also Category:Abergavenny RFC players

- 1899 British Isles XV Frederick Belson (Belson was never capped for Wales or any other nation)
- (Wales) James Bevan (1 cap)
- (Wales) Bob Evans
- (Wales) Charlie Newman (10 caps)
- (Wales) Richard Powell (2 caps)
- (Wales) Russell Taylor
