= Russell Taylor (rugby union) =

British Lions & Wales international rugby union footballer

- Born: Albert Russell Taylor; 2 December 1914 Risca, Wales
- Died: 9 October 1965 (aged 50) Abergavenny, Wales
- School: Pontywaun Grammar School

Rugby union career
- Position: Flanker
Amateur team(s)
Years	Team	Apps	(Points)
- Cross Keys RFC
–	Welsh Police		
–	Abergavenny RFC		
–	Barbarian F.C.		
–	Newport RFC		
–	Monmouthshire		
International career
Years	Team	Apps	(Points)
1937-1939	Wales	3	(3)
1938	British Lions	2	(3)

Albert Russell Taylor (2 December 1914 – 9 October 1965) was a Wales international rugby union player. He was selected for the 1938 British Lions tour to South Africa. Taylor played club rugby for Cross Keys RFC and Abergavenny RFC. Described by rugby historian John Griffiths as an 'intelligent, fast loose forward', Taylor is the only player to have represented the British and Irish Lions while representing Cross Keys.

== Rugby career ==
Taylor first came to note as a rugby player when he represented his Grammar School at Pontywaun as a youth. As an adult he represented at all levels, club, county and international; and as a police officer also played for the Welsh Police Force. His first first class team was Cross Keys RFC, and it was with Cross Keys that he was first selected to represent Wales in the final game of the 1937 Home Nations Championship. The 1937 tournament was a low point for the Wales team, losing all three games; but despite being part of the losing side against Ireland, he was returned for the same encounter in the 1938 campaign, this time a win over the Irish. In the 1938 game against Ireland, Taylor scored his first international points with a try.

In 1938, Taylor was selected for the British Isles team to tour South Africa. Taylor played in 16 matches of the tour, including two Tests against the South Africa national rugby union team. Despite the British team losing the tour 2–1 to the South Africans, Taylor had a good tour, and ended the trip with the highest points across all the matches, scoring 53 points. This was mainly due to Taylor being given the kicking duties after first choice kicker, Vivian Jenkins, was forced to withdraw halfway through the tour. Three of his 53 points came from one of the South Africa matches, when he scored a penalty goal in the Second Test.

On his return from South Africa, Taylor was selected for one final match for Wales, the opening game against England as part of the 1939 Home Nations Championship. The game ended in a two-nil loss for the Welsh. The next season, while still representing Cross Keys at club level, Taylor was approached to play for invitational touring team, the Barbarians. In his career he also played county rugby for Monmouthshire. Taylor later switched clubs, joining Abergavenny, and after his playing career ended, served on the Abergavenny committee and was also its vice-president. After World War II, he switched clubs again, joining Newport, and played 46 games for the senior team over two seasons.
