= St David's Church, Llanddewi Skirrid =

Church of St David, Llanddewi Skirrid
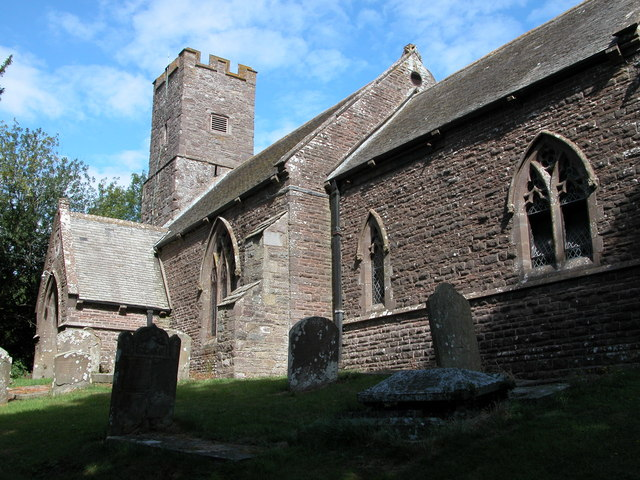
- Church of St David
- Church of St David, Llanddewi Skirrid
- 51.8482°N 2.9582°W
- Location: Monmouthshire
- Country: Wales
- Denomination: Church in Wales

History
- Status: Grade II listed

Architecture
- Architect: John Prichard

Administration
- Diocese: Monmouth
- Parish: Llanddewi Skirrid

The Church of St David stands in the parish of Llanddewi Skirrid, Monmouthshire, Wales. The church was Grade II listed in 1956 as an example of John Prichard's work and because of its historic connection to the family of Crawshay Bailey.

== History and architecture ==
A church has stood here since medieval times but the present building was largely built in the 19th century. Only the 14th or 15th century tower survives of the medieval church, the rest was demolished and rebuilt in 1879 by diocesan architect John Prichard for local landowner Crawshay Bailey, Junior. Bailey was a great benefactor to the church, and spent some £2,000 on its restoration. Bailey laid the foundation stone, still visible in the east chancel wall. He had four new bells installed as well as a valuable pipe organ, said to be one of the finest in the area. Bailey died overseas in 1887 but was brought back to Llanddewi Skirrid to be buried, his grave marked by an ivy-clad cross. His daughters had the east window erected in his memory. Also in the churchyard is a broken sandstone churchyard cross, probably dating from the 15th century.
