= Montefano =

- Comune
- Comune di Montefano
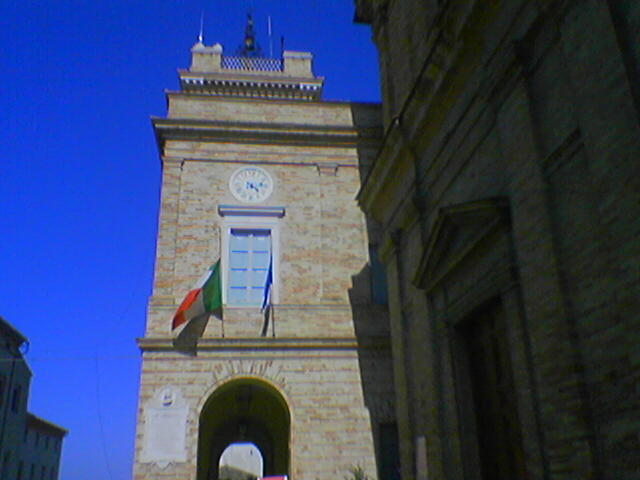

- Location within Italy Location within Marche
- Coordinates: 43°25′N 13°26′E
- Country: Italy
- Region: Marche
- Province: Macerata (MC)
- Frazioni: Montefanovecchio, Osterianuova

Government
  - Mayor: Major Angela Barbieri

Area
  - Total: 33.94 km^{2} (13.10 sq mi)
- Elevation: 242 m (794 ft)

Population (31 December 2017)
  - Total: 3,458
  - Density: 101.9/km^{2} (263.9/sq mi)
- Demonym: Montefanesi
- Time zone: UTC+1 (CET)
  - Summer (DST): UTC+2 (CEST)
- Postal code: 62010
- Dialing code: 0733
- Patron saint: Saint Donatus
- Saint day: August the 7th
- Website: Official website

Montefano is a comune (municipality) in the Province of Macerata in the Italian region Marche, located about 25 kilometres (16 mi) southwest of Ancona and about 13 kilometres (8 mi) north of Macerata.

Montefano borders the following municipalities: Appignano, Filottrano, Montecassiano, Osimo, Recanati.

== Sights ==
Churches in Montefano include:

- Collegiata di San Donato, Baroque style
- Santa Maria Assunta
- San Filippo Benizi, also in Baroque style.

== People ==
- Marcello Cervini degli Spannochi, Pope Marcellus II, was born in Montefano.
- Franco Taruschio, chef (born 1938)
