= Collegiata di San Donato, Montefano =

Roman Catholic church in Marche, Italy

Coordinates: 43°24′43″N 13°26′22″E

San Donato is a Baroque-style, Roman Catholic church located in the town of Montefano, province of Macerata, in the region of Marche, Italy.

== History ==
A church at the site is documented since 1308. The present brick collegiate church dates to 1768, when it was completed in a baroque style. The brick façade is a subdued and traditional two story church front with pilasters. The lateral flanks slightly recede.

The interiors have highly decorated walls and ceilings. The nave is flanked by pilasters with gilded corinthian capitals. The walls and pilasters are decorated with floral arabesque designs; and the friezes with festoons. The church contains the tombs of prominent ecclesiastics and aristocrats of the region, as well as members of the later-suppressed Confraternity of San Benvenuto. The church has four chapels. The first chapel on the left has a canvas depicting an Annunciation from the second half of the 16th century. Above the wooden choir stalls in the apse is a large canvas depicting the Assumption of the Virgin with the Saints Donato and Louis Gonzaga (1708) by Philippus de' Comitibus. St Donatus of Arezzo is the town patron. On the altar is a wooden crucifix of the 16th-century and a reliquary urn. In the chapel of the SS Sacramento (holiest sacrament) is displayed a sarcophagus with the relics of St Seberio Martyr. The organ built in 1722 by Giuseppe Fedeli is found in a loft.
