= Appignano =

- Comune
- Comune di Appignano
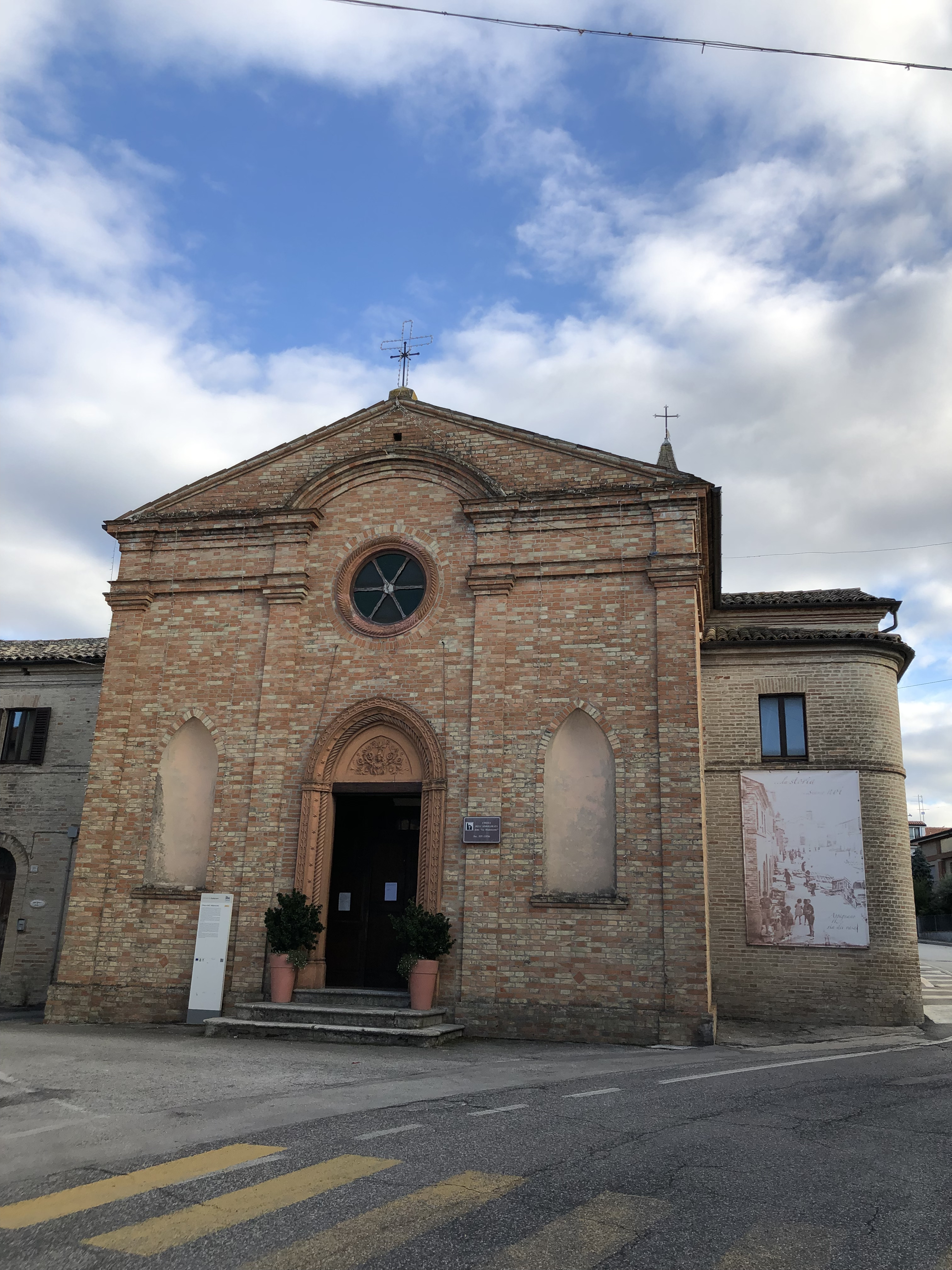

- Location of Appignano in Italy Appignano (Marche)
- Coordinates: 43°24′N 13°12′E
- Country: Italy
- Region: Marche
- Province: Macerata (MC)
- Frazioni: Forano

Government
  - Mayor: Osvaldo Messi

Area
  - Total: 22.67 km^{2} (8.75 sq mi)
- Elevation: 199 m (653 ft)

Population (30 November 2017)
  - Total: 4,200
  - Density: 190/km^{2} (480/sq mi)
- Demonym: Appignanesi
- Time zone: UTC+1 (CET)
  - Summer (DST): UTC+2 (CEST)
- Postal code: 62010
- Dialing code: 0733
- Website: Official website

Appignano is a comune (municipality) in the Province of Macerata in the Italian region Marche, located about 35 kilometres (22 mi) southwest of Ancona and about 20 kilometres (12 mi) northwest of Macerata.

Appignano borders the following municipalities: Cingoli, Filottrano, Macerata, Montecassiano, Montefano, Treia.

Sights include the church of San Giovanni.
