= Restaurant James Sommerin =

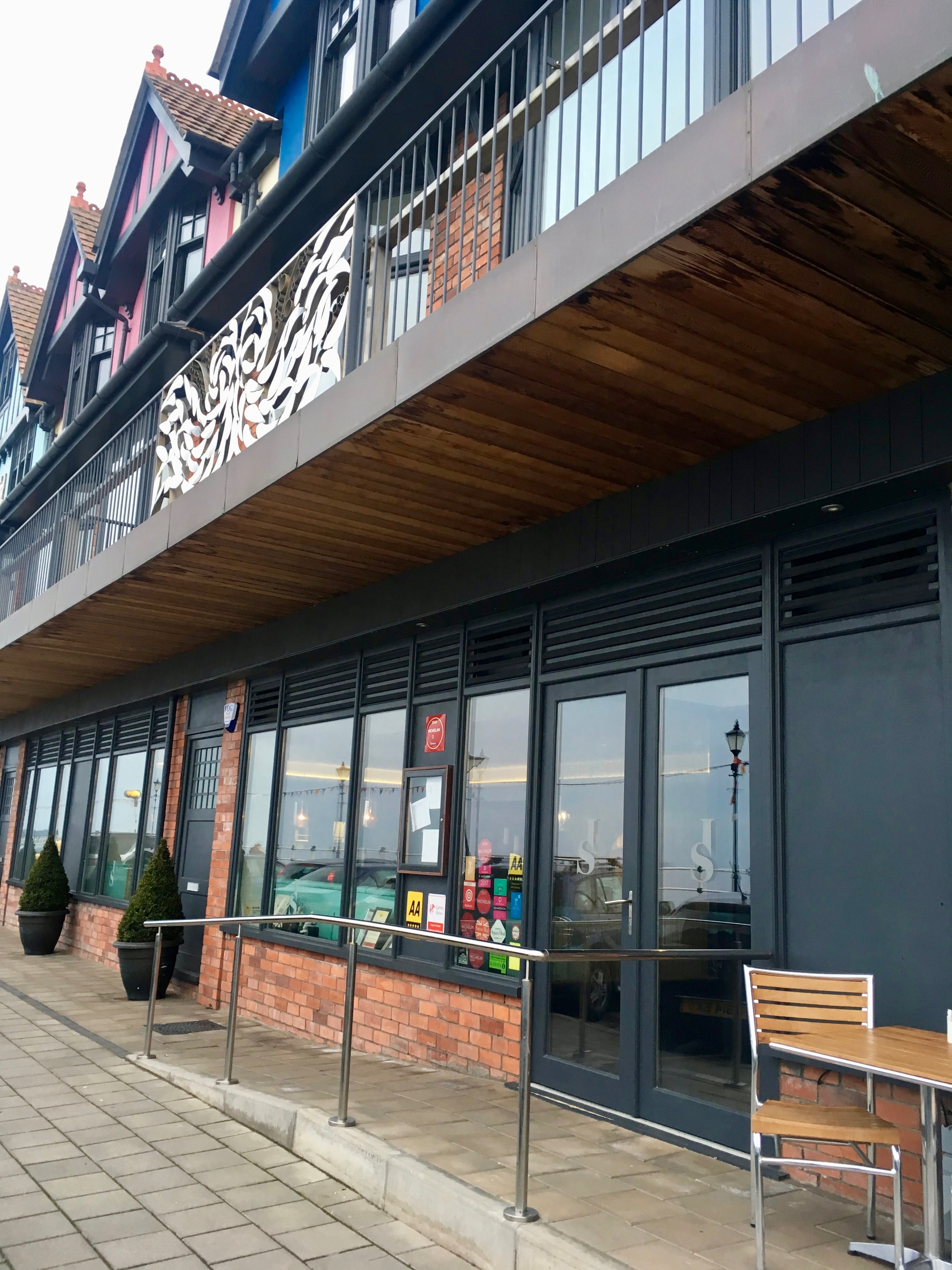
- Restaurant James Sommerin, Penarth, March 2018

- Location within the Vale of Glamorgan

Restaurant information
- Established: May 2014
- Closed: July 2020
- Head chef: James Sommerin
- Food type: British cuisine
- Rating: Michelin Guide
- Location: The Esplanade, Penarth, Vale of Glamorgan, CF64, Wales
- Coordinates: 51.434511°N 3.168065°W

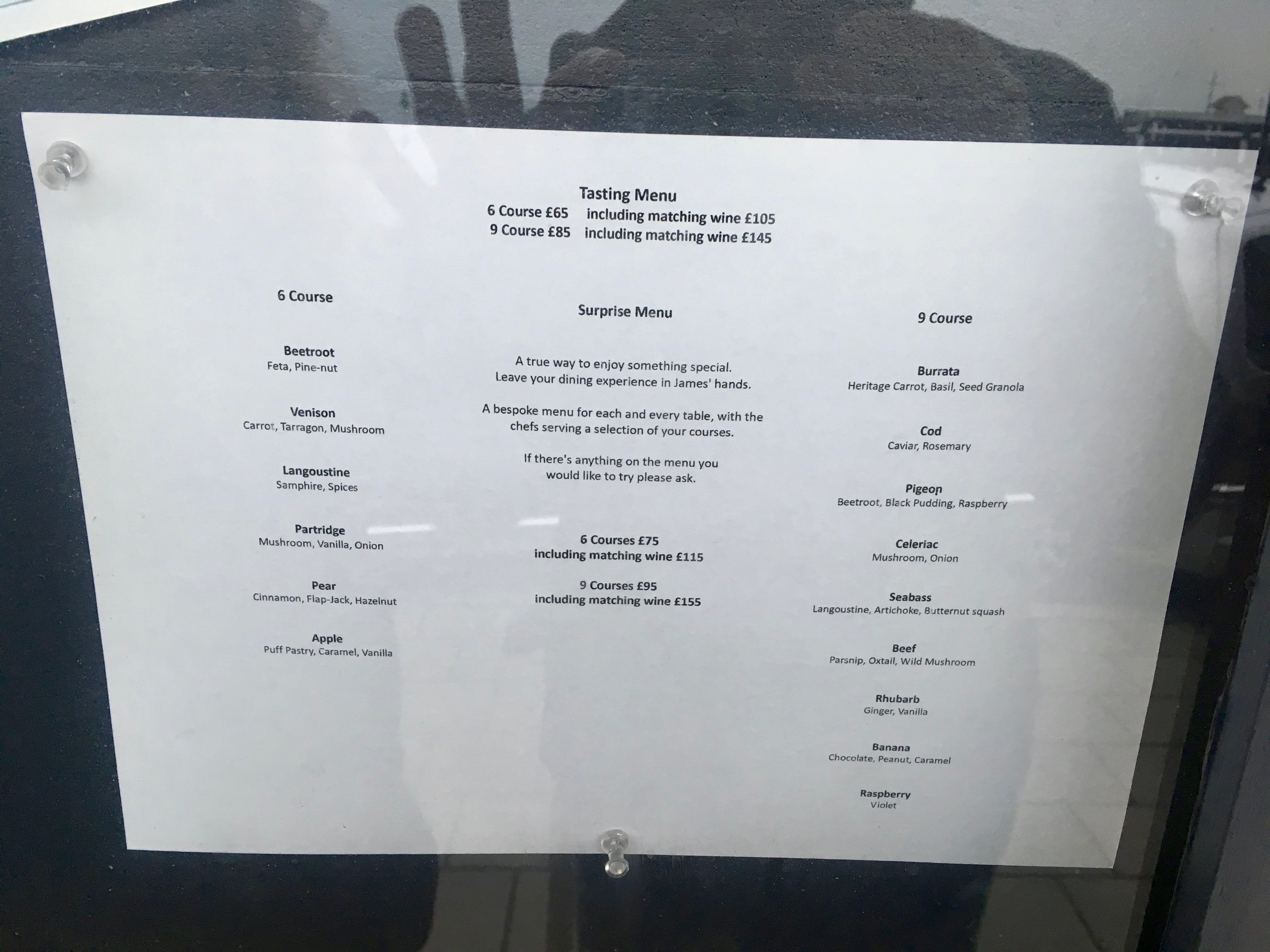
Menu and prices of Restaurant James Sommerin in March 2018

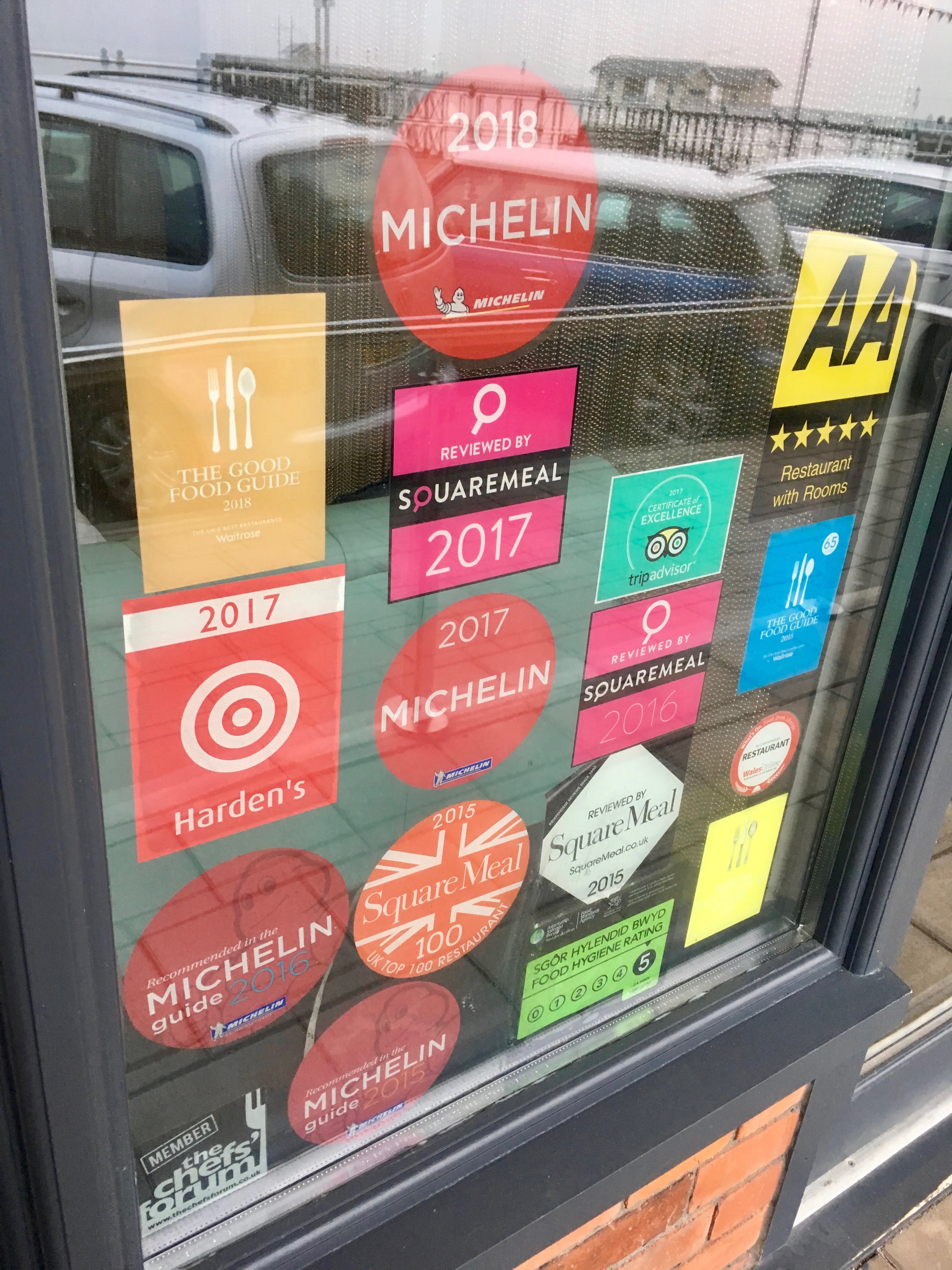
The restaurant review stickers of Restaurant James Sommerin

Restaurant James Sommerin was a restaurant in Penarth, Vale of Glamorgan, Wales. It was owned and run by chef James Sommerin.

Sommerin formerly ran the Michelin starred The Crown and Whitebrook in Monmouthshire.

== Description ==
The Edwardian Beachcliff building was purposely re-built to become Restaurant James Sommerin by Richard Hayward Properties. It was located off the Penarth esplanade, looking out across the Severn Estuary. In 2016 nine 'boutique' bedrooms were added to the restaurant, to accommodate diners travelling from afar.

The seafront restaurant closed in the summer of 2020 following months of COVID-19 lockdowns without financial assistance. Sommerin had planned to start a delivery service, but aborted the plan and instead made 1,000 meals for NHS staff with the food stocks. A year after the closure, Sommerin started a new venture called Home, in Stanwell Road, Penarth.

== See also ==
- List of Michelin-starred restaurants in Wales
