= San Giovanni, Appignano =

Roman Catholic church in Marche, Italy

Coordinates: 43.36343°N 13.34562°E

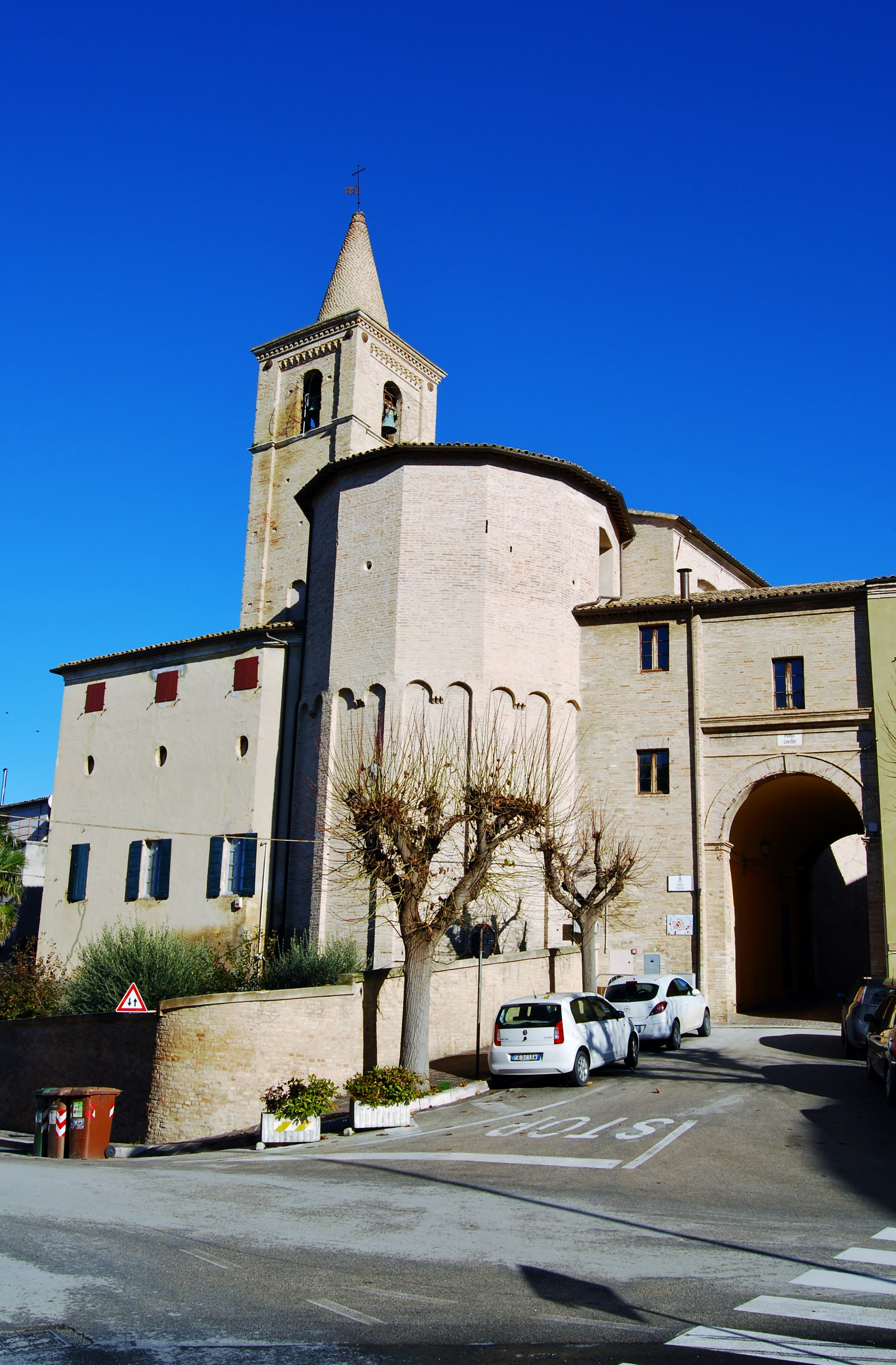
Parish church of San Giovanni behind the Porta Cavour of the town.

San Giovanni is a Gothic-style, Roman Catholic church located in Appignano, province of Macerata, in the region of Marche, Italy.

== History ==
The original church of Appignano was built in the 15th century. The town walls were built in 1443 by Alessandro Sforza when he took possession of the city. The apse of the church was at one time one of the corner towers of the fortification.

The church was enlarged in the 14th century, erecting a gothic bell tower whose belfry has lobed arches. It was here that the apse was extended into the city tower. In the 16th century this church joined with that of the pieve of San Giovanni and San Pietro. The main altarpiece depicts an Enthroned Madonna and Child with Saints Peter, John, Catherine of Alexandria, and two donors (circa 1519-1534) by Giorgio da Tolentino.

In the 18th century, an inventory identified seven altars, including altars dedicated to St Lucy Virgin and Martyr, to St James, to St Vincent Ferrer, to St Bartholemew Apostle, to The Rosary, and to St Joseph. The altar of St Joseph (San Giuseppe) had an altarpiece depicting the Marriage of the Virgin (circa 1630).

In 1750, the interior underwent a major refurbishment, leaving a single nave with three chapels on each side. The façade portal in stone has a rounded pediment and a Baroque cartouche. In 1931 the interior was frescoed by Tommaso Gentili (1868-1963) of Osimo; depicting in the apse events of the life of John the Baptist: a Baptism of Christ, Preaching, and his Decapitation. The choir ceiling has a depiction of a dove symbolizing the Holy Spirit in stucco, while the spandrels have cherubs holding festoons. The nave ceiling has The Redeemer image surrounded by the four evangelists. Above the windows are medallions with busts of saints.
