= Ynyshir (restaurant) =

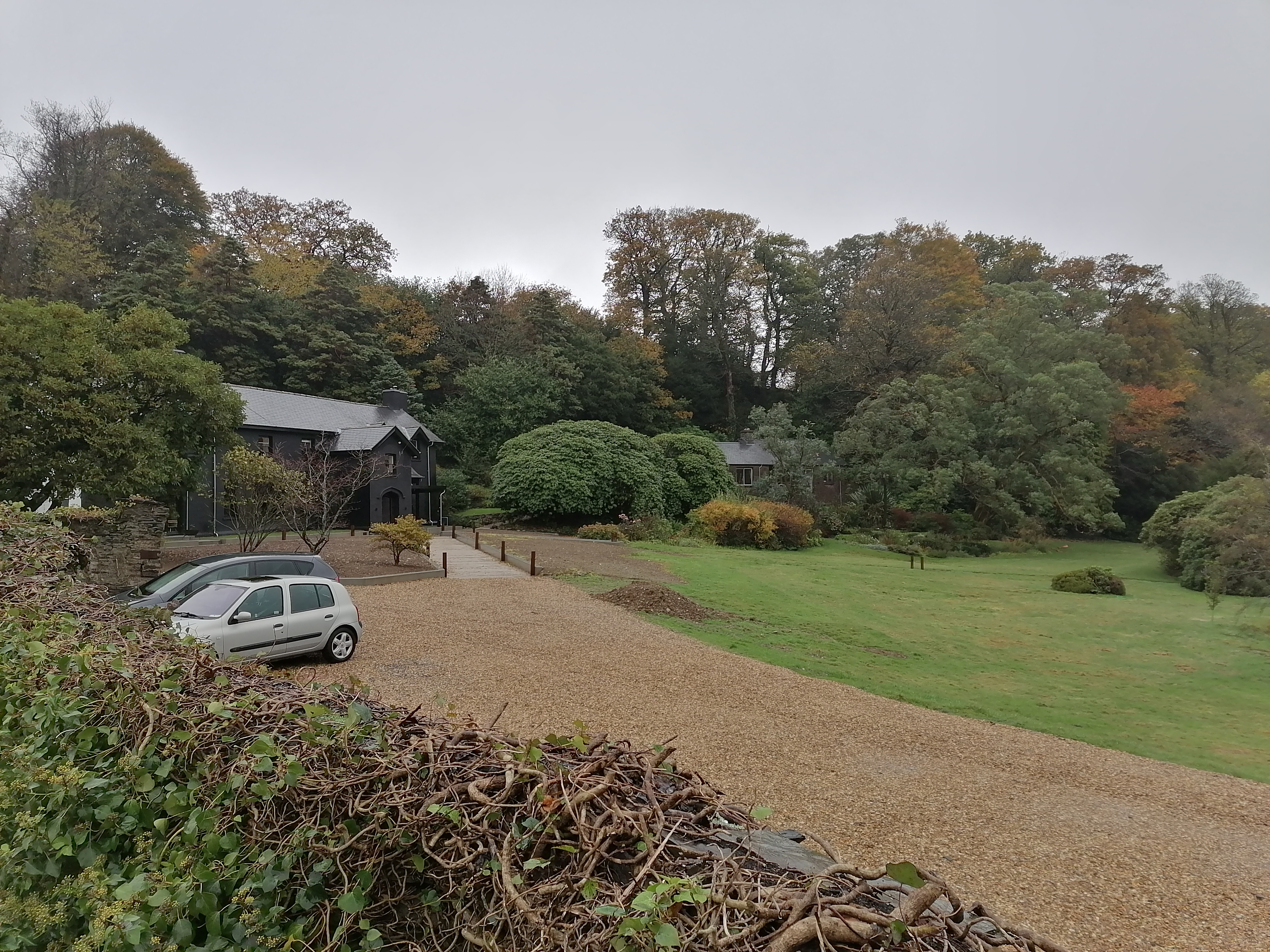
- Front entrance to the restaurant

- Location within Ceredigion

Restaurant information
- Established: 2013
- Owners: Gareth Ward and Amelia Eiriksson
- Head chef: Gareth Ward
- Food type: Creative, Asian-inspired
- Dress code: None
- Rating: Michelin star AA Rosettes (2026)
- Location: Eglwys Fach near Machynlleth, Ceredigion, SY20 8TA, Wales
- Coordinates: 52.54456°N 3.94514°W
- Seating capacity: 20
- Reservations: Yes

Ynyshir is a restaurant in Eglwys Fach, Ceredigion, Wales. It is run by head chef Gareth Ward, who owns it with his partner Amelia Eiriksson, and in 2022 became the first restaurant in Wales to be awarded two Michelin stars.

== Cuisine ==
Ynyshir serves a tasting menu dinner consisting of approximately 30 courses, with Japanese inspiration and focused on meat and sashimi. The cuisine is described by the Michelin Guide as "creative". Ward uses live fire cooking over birchwood, and ages Welsh Wagyu beef for 300 days and ages seafood in a Himalayan salt chamber.

== History ==
Gareth Ward, originally from County Durham, has run the restaurant since 2013. It was originally a hotel called Ynyshir Hall; after the owner Joan Reen died in 2016, Ward and his partner Amelia Eiriksson, an architect, rebranded the business as Ynyshir Restaurant and Rooms, a restaurant with ten bedrooms. During the COVID lockdown, the restaurant sold meal kits.

After an inspection in November 2025, Ynyshir received a one-star hygiene rating from the Food Standards Agency, which Ward blamed on the kitchen's use of raw and aged ingredients whose freshness the inspectors had questioned. The full report, obtained by the BBC after a Freedom of Information request, mentioned among other health and safety violations: flies, a dirty knife which the restaurant said was in the process of being cleaned at the time, cooking temperature records showing inadequate heating of sous vide cod, absence of an ultraviolet light which the restaurant stated was present and in operation at the time of inspection, and inadequate health safeguards for raw lobster, which Ceredigion council ordered Ynyshir to stop serving. The restaurant's five-star hygiene rating was restored in August 2026, after a reinspection satisfied the council that Ynyshir "had addressed all matters identified during the original inspection".

== Reviews ==
A 2018 review in The Telegraph awarded Ynyshir 9 out of 10 for the location, character, service, and facilities, and 10 out of 10 for the food and drink. The reviewer described Ward as "ballsy and fearlessly experimental" and each of the 19 dishes on the tasting menu as "impossibly dainty and delicious".

The reviewer from The Times in 2022 gave an overall score of 7 out of 10 for the venue, and 9 out of 10 for the food and drink. They said of the tasting menu that "each [dish] is intensely flavoured and somehow always more thrilling than the last" and "this is really gastronomy for meat lovers".

Andy Hayler, the first person to visit every 3-Michelin-star restaurant, characterised Ward as "like Picasso" and wrote, "Gareth says he's ingredient-led and actually means it."

Celebrity chef James Martin described Ynyshir in 2024 as the best restaurant in the world and in 2026 predicted it would soon achieve three Michelin stars.

A 2025 review described Ynyshir as "a culinary house party", for not only the food but the loud DJ music. In The Guardian, Zoe Williams also mentioned the loud techno music.

== Awards and recognition ==
Ynyshir Hall held a Michelin Star until 2011 and regained it in 2014 after Gareth Ward's arrival.

In 2017 the restaurant was awarded five AA rosettes, the first restaurant in Wales to achieve this.

In 2022 Ynyshir became the first restaurant in Wales to be awarded two Michelin stars by the Michelin Guide.

Ynyshir was voted Restaurant of the Year at the National Restaurant Awards in 2022 and 2023.

== See also ==
- List of Michelin-starred restaurants in Wales
