= Home (restaurant) =

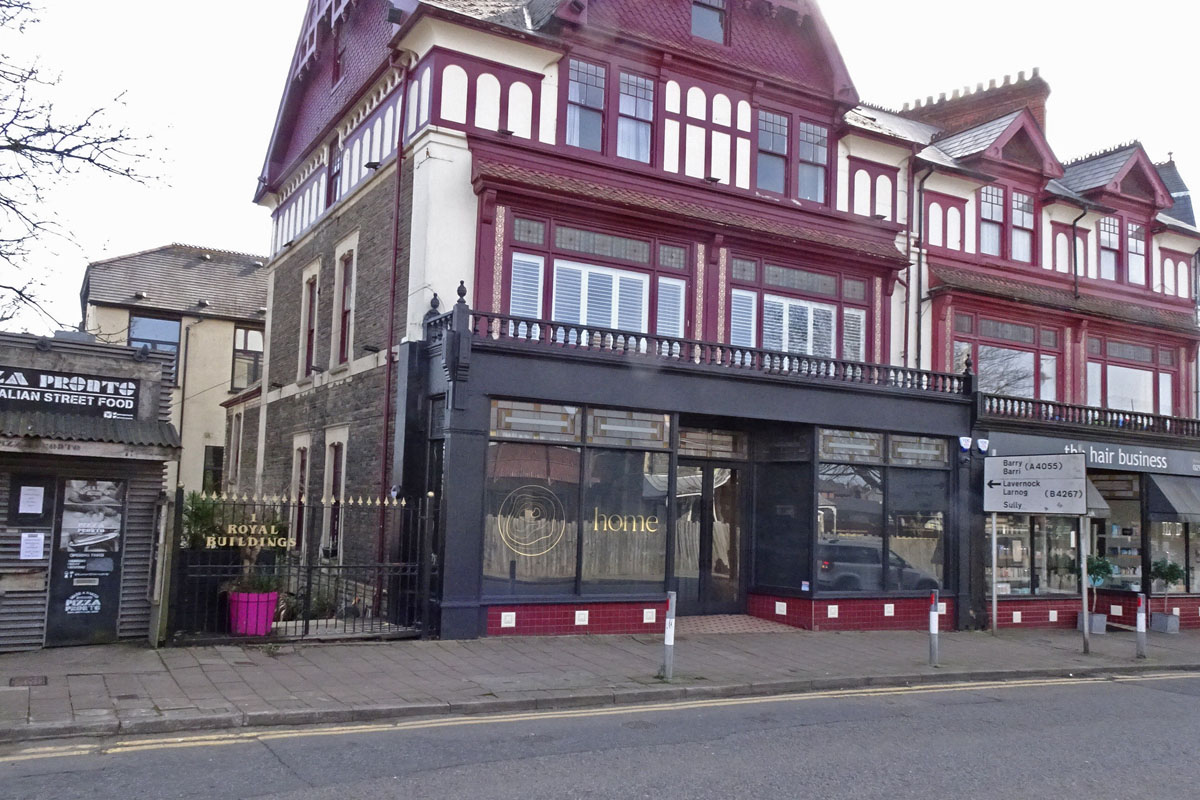
- Home, Stanwell Road, Penarth

- Location within the Vale of Glamorgan

Restaurant information
- Established: August 2021
- Head chef: James Sommerin
- Food type: British cuisine
- Rating: Michelin Guide; AA Rosettes (2023)
- Location: 1, Royal Buildings, Stanwell Road, Penarth, Penarth, Vale of Glamorgan, CF64, Wales
- Coordinates: 51.43612°N 3.17513°W

Home is a restaurant in Penarth, Vale of Glamorgan, Wales. It is owned by chef James Sommerin and run by Sommerin and his family.

Sommerin formerly ran the Michelin starred Restaurant James Sommerin on Penarth seafront and, before that, the Michelin starred The Crown at Whitebrook in Monmouthshire.

== Description ==
Home is located at 1, Royal Buildings on Stanwell Road in Penarth town centre and opened its doors on 18 August 2021. It has blacked-out windows to create and intimate, immersive experience for customers, who also have to ring the front doorbell to enter. Home is much smaller than Sommerin's previous restaurant on Penarth seafront. Neither does it allow diners to choose items from a menu, instead they are presented with a four-course lunch or an evening eight-dish taster menu.

Home is run by Sommerin and his immediate family, with Sommerin and his daughter Georgia working in the kitchen. His wife Louise and daughter Angharad also work front of house in the restaurant.

== Recognition ==
Six months after opening, Home appeared in the Michelin Guide and was awarded a Michelin Star. A year later in February 2023 the restaurant was awarded three AA rosettes for culinary excellence. Home came 25th on SquareMeal's 2022 UK top 100 list of restaurants.

== Television appearances ==
In the first episode of the Hairy Bikers television series The Hairy Bikers Go Local, first broadcast on BBC2 on 3 January 2023, the duo visit Home to try one of the Sommerins' dishes.

Home appeared in BBC2's The Great British Menu, first broadcast on 15 February 2023, when Georgia Sommerin competed to cook a dish for a Paddington Bear-themed banquet.
