= Llanddewi Skirrid =

Coordinates: 51°50′52″N 2°57′31″W

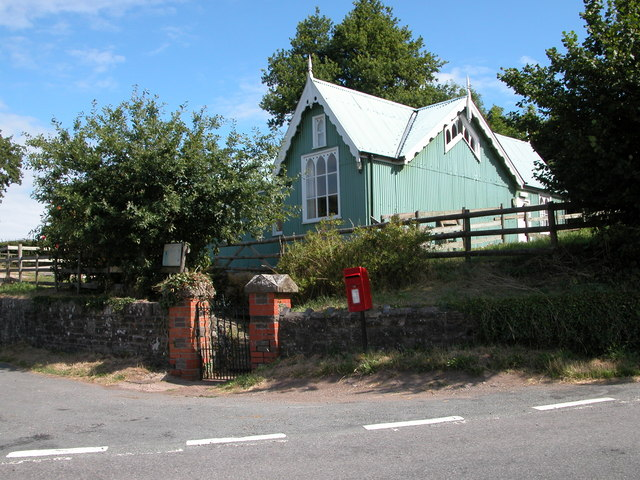
- Llanddewi Skirrid Village Hall

- Location within Monmouthshire
- Principal area: Monmouthshire
- Preserved county: Gwent
- Country: Wales
- Sovereign state: United Kingdom
- Post town: USK
- Postcode district: NP
- Police: Gwent
- Fire: South Wales
- Ambulance: Welsh
- UK Parliament: Monmouth

Llanddewi Skirrid (Welsh: Llanddewi Ysgyryd) is a village in Monmouthshire, south east Wales, United Kingdom.

== Location ==
Llanddewi Skirrid is located 3 miles (4.8 km) north east of Abergavenny on the old B4521 road to Ross-on-Wye.

== History and amenities ==
The Skirrid mountain overlooks the village and parish. The Skirrid is a stand-alone mountain, an outlier of the Black Mountains, and the most easterly mountain within the Brecon Beacons National Park. The Church of St David is of mediaeval origins but was almost completely rebuilt in the 19th century by John Prichard for the local landowner Crawshay Bailey Jr.

The Walnut Tree, a restaurant opened in the early 1960s, eventually became Michelin starred for its Italian/Welsh fusion cuisine. After the original owner retired, it was taken over by his son. After losing its Michelin rating, under Francesco Mattioli, it was featured on the Channel 4 television show Ramsay's Kitchen Nightmares. It closed in 2007 before reopening with new owners, and was later named the best restaurant in Britain, and was awarded a fresh Michelin star in 2010.
