= James Sommerin =

Welsh chef

- Born: Caerleon, Newport
- Culinary career
- Current restaurant(s): The Shed, Home
- Previous restaurant(s): Restaurant James Sommerin The Crown at Whitebrook
- Television show: BBC2 Great British Menu

James Sommerin (born c. 1978 in Caerleon) is a Michelin-starred Welsh chef.

== Early life ==
Born in Caerleon, Sommerin baked with his grandmother on Saturdays as a child. Determined to become a chef, his father secured the 12-year-old Sommerin's first Saturday job in an Italian restaurant in the hope of dissuading his son from getting into the industry, but the job only served to convince Sommerin of his vocation.

After school he undertook formal cookery training. Sommerin's first full-time job cooking was as a commis chef at the Cwrt Bleddyn Hotel, Llangybi. Then, aged 16, he headed to the Farleyer House Hotel in Aberfeldy, Scotland, where he trained further under Richard Lyth, who gave him his under-stated French style.

== Career ==
Returning to Wales to be closer to his family, Sommerin joined The Crown at Whitebrook, Monmouthshire in 2000 as Sous Chef. In December 2003 he became Executive Chef. Under his control, The Crown at Whitebrook gained a Michelin star in 2007, which it retained for seven years until, due to financial difficulties, The Crown at Whitebrook ceased trading in March 2013.

In 2014 Sommerin launched Restaurant James Sommerin on the seafront at Penarth. It closed in July 2020 due to financial pressures resulting from the Covid-19 lockdown.

Later in 2020 Sommerin opened The Shed in Barry, Vale of Glamorgan, a "rather cooler premises" in a reclaimed industrial shed, with less expensive food prices.

In July 2021 Sommerin started a new venture called Home, in Stanwell Road, Penarth.

=== Television career ===
Having been selected as one of the Chefs to Watch in 2008 by The Guardian, Sommerin represented Wales in the 2009 final of the BBC's Great British Menu, having beaten Stephen Terry.

== Personal life ==
Married to Louise, the couple live in Penarth and have three daughters.
