= Ginestreto =

- Frazione
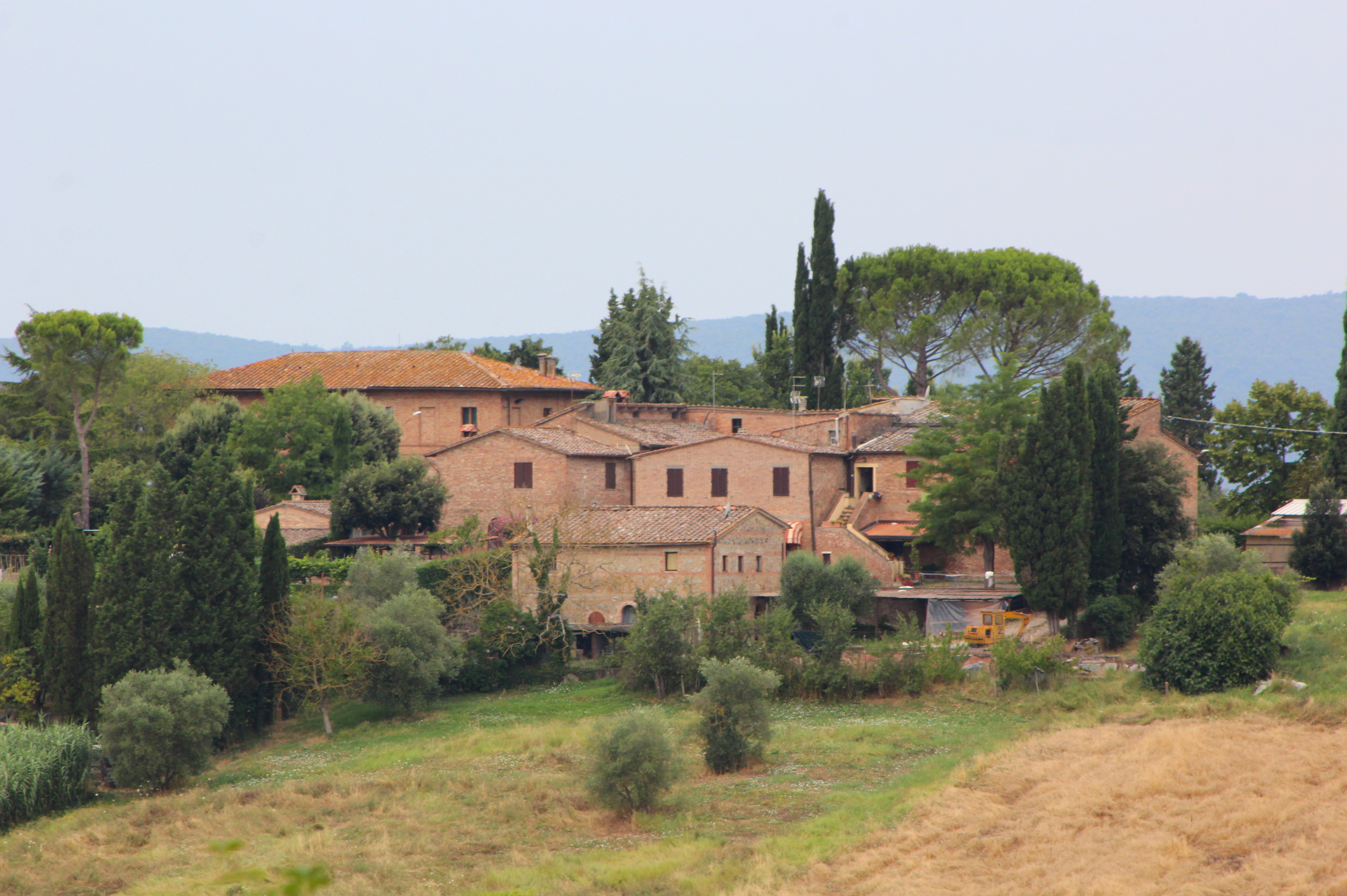
- View of Ginestreto

- Location of Ginestreto in Italy
- Coordinates: 43°16′22″N 11°18′45″E
- Country: Italy
- Region: Tuscany
- Province: Siena (SI)
- Comune: Siena
- Elevation: 248 m (814 ft)

Population (2011)
  - Total: 43
- Time zone: UTC+1 (CET)
  - Summer (DST): UTC+2 (CEST)

Ginestreto is a village in Tuscany, central Italy, in the comune of Siena, province of Siena. At the time of the 2001 census its population was 36.

Ginestreto is about 6 km from Siena.
