= Franco Taruschio =

Italian chef and restaurateur

- Born: 1938 (age 87–88); Italy
- Culinary career
- Previous restaurant: The Walnut Tree (1963 to 2001)

Franco Taruschio (born 1938) is an Italian former chef and restaurateur. For 38 years, he was the owner of The Walnut Tree restaurant in Abergavenny, Wales, during which time the establishment held a Michelin Star.

== Early life ==
Taruschio was born in Montefano, Italy, in 1938.

== Career ==
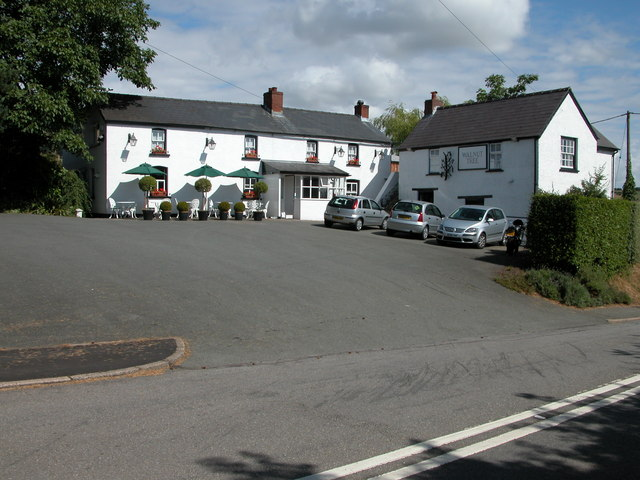
The Walnut Tree in Abergavenny

In 1963, Taruschio opened The Walnut Tree in Abergavenny, Wales. He ran it for the next 38 years, before selling it to compatriots Francesco and Enrica Mattioli.

After retiring, Taruschio taught in Italy, while also working on several projects in the UK, such as Links into Languages, a project which taught culinary students Italian cuisine. The students won the European Initiative Award and the Mary Glasgow Award.

Taruschio has written five cookery books, including 1993's Leaves from the Walnut Tree.

== Personal life ==
Taruschio is married to Ann (née Forester), who co-founded The Walnut Tree with her husband. The couple adopted a daughter from Thailand.

In 2003, Taruschio was awarded an OBE in recognition of his services to the culinary industry and his service to Monmouthshire.

A portrait of Taruschio, taken by Barry Marsden, is in the possession of the National Portrait Gallery.

== See also ==
- Cuisine of Monmouthshire
