= Montecassiano =

- Comune
- Comune di Montecassiano
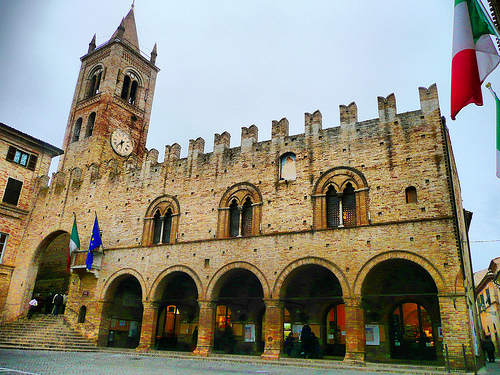

- Location within Italy Location within Marche
- Coordinates: 43°22′N 13°26′E
- Country: Italy
- Region: Marche
- Province: Macerata (MC)
- Frazioni: Sant'Egidio, Sambucheto, Vallecascia, Vissani

Government
  - Mayor: Leonardo Catena

Area
  - Total: 33.0 km^{2} (12.7 sq mi)
- Elevation: 215 m (705 ft)

Population (30 November 2017)
  - Total: 7,082
  - Density: 215/km^{2} (556/sq mi)
- Demonym: Montecassianesi
- Time zone: UTC+1 (CET)
  - Summer (DST): UTC+2 (CEST)
- Postal code: 62010
- Dialing code: 0733
- Website: Official website

Montecassiano is a comune (municipality) in the Province of Macerata in the Italian region Marche, located about 30 kilometres (19 mi) south of Ancona and about 8 kilometres (5 mi) north of Macerata.

The municipality of Montecassiano contains the frazioni (subdivisions, mainly villages and hamlets) Sant'Egidio, Sambucheto, Vallecascia, and Vissani.

Montecassiano borders the following municipalities: Appignano, Macerata, Montefano, Recanati. It is one of I Borghi più belli d'Italia ("The most beautiful villages of Italy").

== Main sights ==
Sights in the town include:

- Palazzo dei Priori (13th century)
- Church of San Marco (14th century)
- Collegiate church of Santa Maria della Misericordia (12th century)
- Collegiate church Santa Maria Assunta
- Oratory of San Nicolò (13th century)
