= The Checkers (restaurant) =

Restaurant in Montgomery, UK

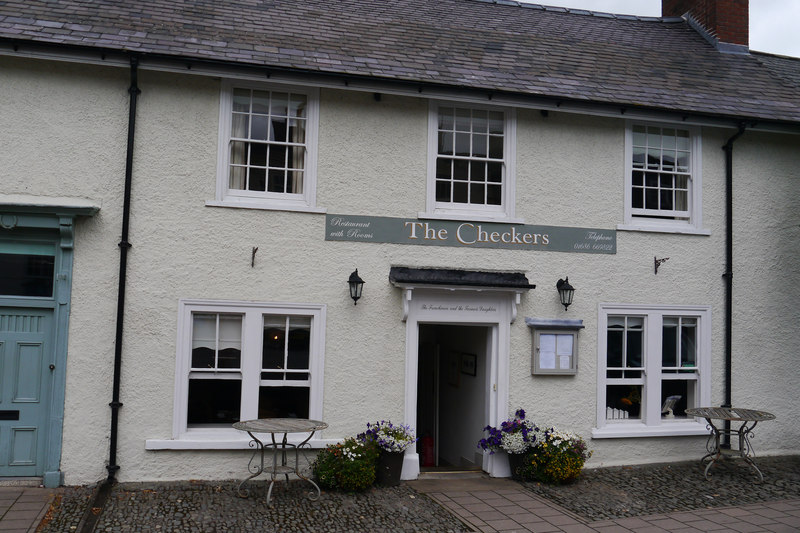
- The Checkers in 2014

- Location within Powys

Restaurant information
- Established: March 2011 (Under current ownership)
- Head chef: Stephane Borie
- Pastry chef: Sarah Francis
- Food type: French/British cuisine
- Rating: (Michelin Guide 2012)
- Location: Broad Street, Montgomery, Powys, SY15 6PN, Wales
- Coordinates: 52.560499°N 3.147873°W
- Seating capacity: 40
- Website: checkerswales.co.uk

The Checkers, is a restaurant with rooms in Montgomery, Powys, Wales. Historically, the building was used as a coaching inn dating from the 17th century. Until the 2000s, it was used as a pub/hotel. It was converted into a French restaurant in 2012 and under chef Stephane Borie, it was awarded a Michelin star later that year. There are two main rooms in the restaurant, and three hotel rooms. It has received a mixed reception from critics, who have praised particular dishes but criticised the atmosphere. It serves both modern and classic French dishes, and in 2016, switched to only using set menus. In 2018, The Checkers moved away from their Michelin star and opened a breakfast and lunch restaurant renamed Checkers Pantry.

== Description ==
The restaurant is located on Broad Street in the town of Montgomery, Powys, a short distance from Montgomery Castle. There is a separate dining room and bar/lounge area in the restaurant. The dining room has low-slung beams, and an open brick fireplace, around which are placed Laura Ashley sofas. The chestnut wood flooring of the restaurant was created from a fallen tree on the Francis family farm. There is room to serve up to 40 diners, with 12 members of staff working there. There are three en-suite rooms available to hire on a hotel basis.

=== Menu ===
The menu uses locally grown produce from Powys and Shropshire, and is a combination of classic and modern French cuisine with seasonal changes. Dishes include a pork belly main from the nearby Neuadd Fach baconry, which is served with an apple mousseline, pear and au jus. A monkfish main course comes served with a langoustine consommé and a Brussels sprout purée. Other French courses include a French onion soup and a cheese soufflé. Desserts served include a nougat tube filled with white chocolate and passion fruit mousse, and a trio of lemon pots.

In early 2016, the a la carte menu was stopped and the restaurant moved to serving only set menus. This was attributed to a desire to reduce the food waste produced by the restaurant, which staff hoped that could drop by half as a result of the change. The children's menu consists of smaller portions of the main menu.

== History ==
The building dates from the 17th century, and was originally used as a coaching inn. References to the Checkers Inn in Montgomery within the British Newspaper Archives appear as far back as 1855, when Rebecca Davies' annual ball was due to take place in the large room there. In 1870, the inn was run by Charles Williams. During the early 2000s, the building was operated as a hotel and pub, with Eric Whittingham as landlord.

Head chef Stephane Borie trained with Michel Roux at the three Michelin star restaurant The Waterside Inn in Bray, Berkshire for seven years, where he met pastry chef Sarah Francis. Borie and Francis went on to run the Herbert Arms at Chirbury near Montgomery in 2008 with Sarah's sister Kathryn running the front of house service. The trio took over The Checkers in March 2011, refurbishing the former pub as a restaurant. They praised the customer base following them from the Herbert Arms to the new venture.

The restaurant was awarded a Michelin star for 2012. The list was announced in October 2011, only seven months after the restaurant opened. Borie said "I am very surprised, but it is teamwork obviously, we didn't really expect anything because we have been in business for such a small amount of time." Following the star, Borie increased the number of kitchen staff from three to six.

In 2018, however, the restaurant owners decided to move away from their Michelin star and to reopen the restaurant to serve only breakfast and lunch but not dinner. They reopened as Checkers Pantry in mid-November 2018.

== Reception ==
Neil Thomas visited the restaurant shortly after it was awarded a Michelin star. He gave it a rating of five out of five in his review for the Shropshire Star. He praised the Cerwyn cheese soufflé and the pheasant pithiviers starters, as well as three of the mains; a roast duck dish, the pork belly dish, and a venison dish. Around the same time, Sally Williams reviewed the restaurant for the Western Mail, who also praised the soufflé. She called the atmosphere "comfortable" and stated that it had a home-like quality to it. In 2013, the restaurant was ranked as the second best in Wales, behind The Walnut Tree in Abergavenny, in the Sunday Times list of the 100 best restaurants in the UK.

Matthew Norman gave the restaurant three and a half stars out of five, following a visit in early 2014 for The Daily Telegraph. He praised the soufflé and the French onion soup, but called the monkfish "bland". The pork belly dish was described by his colleague as "superb, just the right side of too intimately piggy". Norman concluded that the restaurant was a "slick operation", but the "character, vibrancy and fun had been slaughtered on the altar of satisfying the inspectorate".
