= Crawshay Bailey Jr =

19th-century landowner in Wales

Crawshay Bailey Junior (1841 – 17 April 1887) was one of the great landowners of Wales towards the end of the 19th century. The son and namesake of industrialist and iron-master Crawshay Bailey, he inherited all of his father's lands and properties, some 12,248 acres (50 km^{2}) in Wales alone. He did not take on his father's iron manufacturing business, instead he devoted himself towards developing his landed estates. He built his family seat at Maindiff, Abergavenny and was an important benefactor to the area.

== Early life ==
Although his father, Crawshay Bailey Snr, was married to Anne Moore, Crawshay Bailey Jnr was borne by Sarah Baker, a servant in the Bailey household. He was Bailey's only son.

== Maindiff Court ==
Upon inheriting his father's estate in 1872, Bailey Jnr moved into a house at Maindiff, just outside Abergavenny. However, it failed to embody his new found wealth and status so in 1875 he built a new mansion, Maindiff Court, leading to him being dubbed locally the 'Squire of Maindiff'. The grand three-storey house had a two-storey porch with a single storey portico extending from it, headed by a balustrade and supported on Corinthian columns. The house was later demolished in the 1930s to make way for Maindiff Court Hospital

== Public life ==
In 1873, Bailey married Elizabeth, Countess Bettina, daughter of the Count Metaxa. Together they had two daughters, Clara and Augusta.

Bailey became an extremely popular figure in the Abergavenny area owing to his "benevolent and genial nature" and generous support of charitable institutions and projects in the town.

Maindiff Court acquired a reputation for "unbounded hospitality". The Bailey's threw garden parties for their tenants and their families, Bailey and his wife made themselves at home among the locals and all were made welcome to explore the house and gardens. A luxurious spread was provided and music and dancing went on until nightfall.

Testament to Bailey's popularity, the town celebrated the marriage of his eldest daughter in 1884 by decorating the streets with flags and banners. Crowds of thousands reportedly gathered in Abergavenny to welcome the newlyweds. A marching band lead the procession of carriages carrying the happy couple and the rest of the Bailey family from the railway station through the town and on to Maindiff Court, where they were greeted by a choir of local schoolchildren. Afterwards the crowd which had followed the procession adjourned to an adjoining field where the Baileys provided refreshments and later that evening entertainment in the form of a pyrotechnic display consisting of fireworks and bonfires lit on the surrounding hills. A similar celebration took place in 1888 for the marriage of Bailey's other daughter.

== Benefaction ==
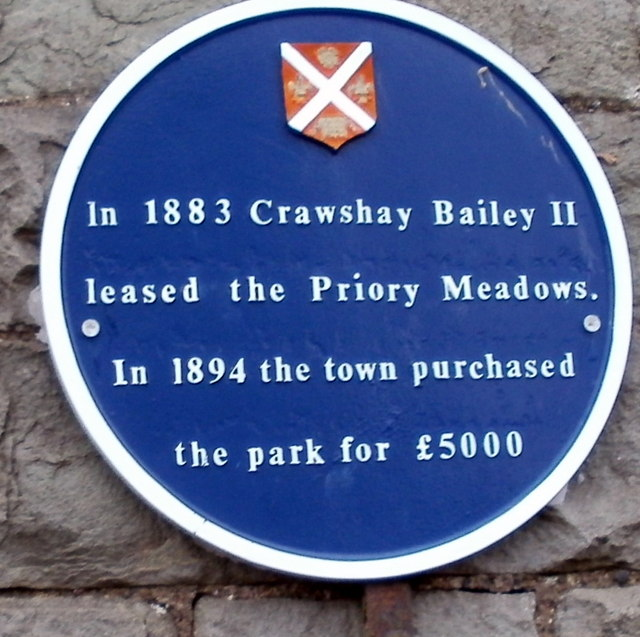
Blue plaque commemorating Crawshay Bailey Junior's establishment of Bailey Park, Abergavenny

In Abergavenny and the surrounding area Bailey's benevolence can be still be appreciated.

In 1883 he leased the land known as 'Priory Meadows' in Abergavenny and established Bailey Park. He had gates and railings installed, employed a park keeper and opened the park to the public. In 1894 when the lease came to an end, the town purchased the park freehold with monies raised from the Bailey family.

Bailey was a staunch supporter of the church. In 1877 he helped raise £11,000 for the restoration of St Mary's church, Abergavenny. In 1879 he covered the £2000 cost of rebuilding St David's church in Llanddewi Skirrid, where he and his mother are buried. He was also responsible for the construction of the village hall in Llanddewi Skirrid and a lodge for the widow of the vicar there. He also funded refurbishments to St Faith's church, Llanfoist where his father is buried.

== Death ==
Bailey died in 1887 at the age of 46, after suffering a quick decline in his health. In the months leading up to his death he had become a recluse, living in Monkstown, Dublin, apparently in the hope that the sea air would remedy his declining health. At the time of his death he had become estranged from his family, after abruptly leaving them to travel the world, during which time he made little attempt to contact anybody back home. His death also came as a shock to the townspeople of Abergavenny who held him in high esteem and were unaware of his declining health.
