= The Walnut Tree (restaurant) =

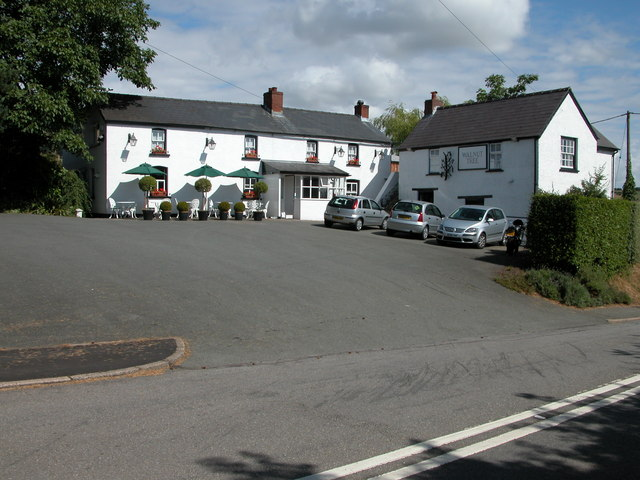

- Location within the Monmouthshire

Restaurant information
- Previous owners: Franco Taruschio; Francesco and Enrica Mattioli
- Head chef: Shaun Hill
- Food type: British cuisine
- Rating: (Michelin Guide 2022)
- Location: Llanddewi Skirrid, Monmouthshire, NP7 8AW, Wales
- Coordinates: 51.843242°N 2.964046°W
- Website: www.thewalnuttreeinn.com

The Walnut Tree (also known as The Walnut Tree Inn) is a restaurant in Llanddewi Skirrid, Monmouthshire, Wales. It is run by chef Shaun Hill and holds a Michelin star. It was previously owned by Franco Taruschio for 38 years, and had previously held a star when Stephen Terry was head chef there.

== History ==
The restaurant was opened by Franco Taruschio in the 1960s, who owned The Walnut Tree for more than 30 years. It was purchased by Francesco and Enrica Mattioli in 2001. Under the management of head chef Stephen Terry, it won a Michelin star in 2002, but lost it in 2004 after Terry's departure. He moved to rival Abergavenny restaurant The Hardwick.

The Walnut Tree began to have financial troubles, and so the Mattiolis sought the guidance of celebrity chef Gordon Ramsay, appearing on the television series Ramsay's Kitchen Nightmares in 2004. Ramsay criticised the overpricing at the restaurant and helped them to hire a new head chef. After a second appearance on Kitchen Nightmares in 2005, Mattioli criticised the show as "fake". The Walnut Tree closed in 2007, after going into receivership due to "involuntary insolvency", and the Mattiolis blamed Ramsay's show for making the restaurant seem too expensive. The restaurant was reopened in early 2008 as a joint partnership between hotel-owner William Griffiths and new head chef Shaun Hill.

== Reception ==
In 2008, it was named the BMW Square Meal Best UK Restaurant and the AA Restaurant of the Year for Wales within nine months after reopening under Hill. A year later, The Walnut Tree was named the best restaurant in the UK by the Gourmet Britain food guide, who suggested that Hill could win a Michelin star with the restaurant. The restaurant regained its Michelin star in the 2010 guide, which it still holds as of 2025.

== See also ==
- List of Michelin-starred restaurants in Wales
