= The Grove (Pembrokeshire hotel) =

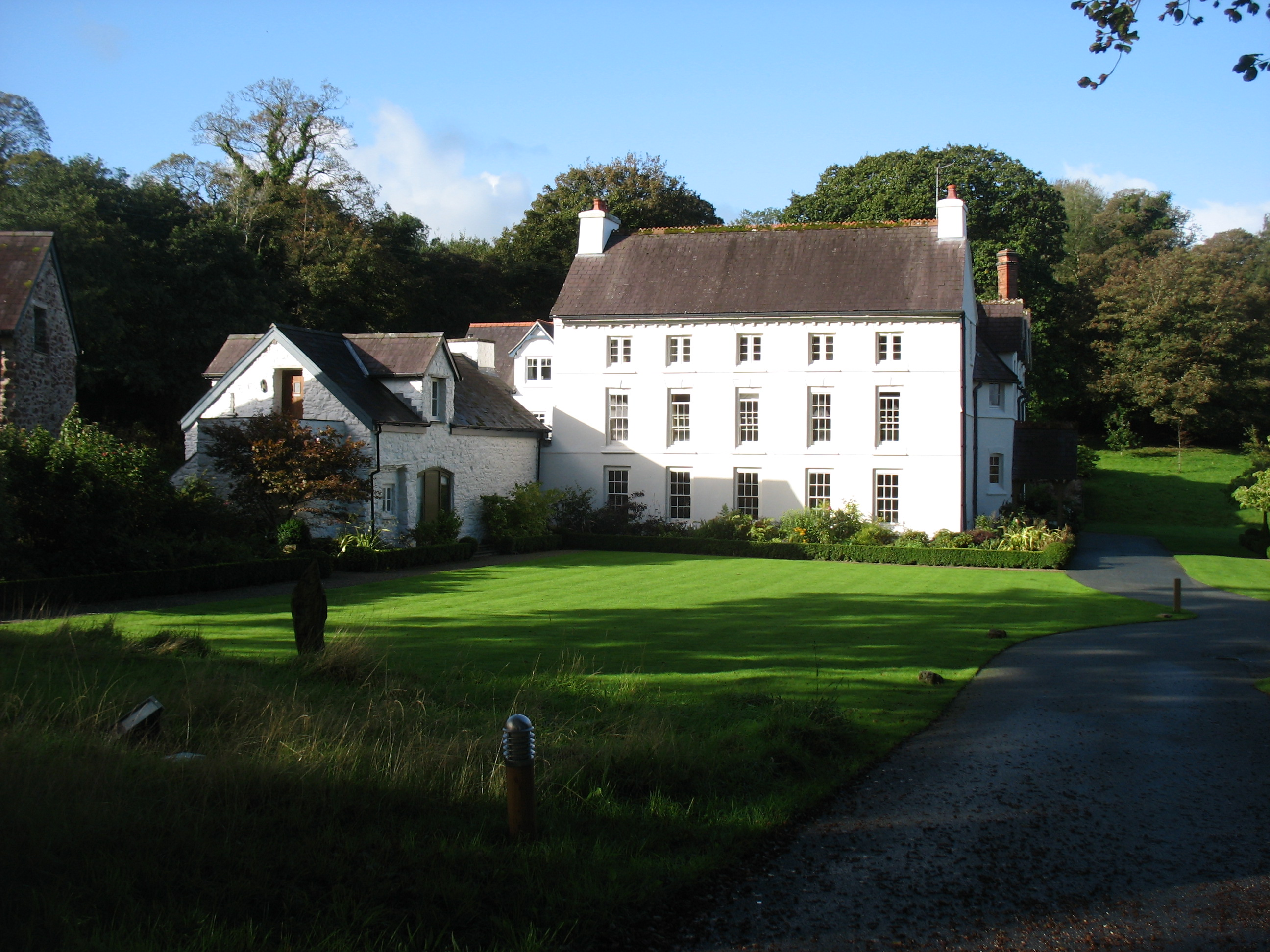

- Location within Pembrokeshire
- Hotel chain: Seren

General information
- Coordinates: 51.7832°N 4.7674°W

Other information
- Number of rooms: 25
- Number of restaurants: 2

Website
- https://grovenarberth.co.uk/

The Grove of Narberth, also known as The Grove, is a country house hotel near Narberth, Pembrokeshire, Wales. The property occupies approximately 26 acres of gardens, woodland and meadows and includes a historic country house, a former longhouse and other buildings. The hotel has 25 bedrooms and two restaurants, including the fine-dining Fernery.

The property has origins dating to at least the 15th century and was associated with the Poyer family before passing through the Callen and Lewis families. In the 19th century, architect John Pollard Seddon extended and altered the house. After a period of decline, Neil and Zoe Kedward acquired the property in 2007 and restored it as a hotel.

== History ==
The site has a history dating to the 15th century. A longhouse, traditionally described as having accommodated both a family and livestock, survives on the estate. The property was associated with the Poyer family, and Daniel Poyer inherited it in 1677. The main masonry house and walled garden are believed to date from the late 17th or early 18th century.

The property subsequently passed to the Callen family through marriage in 1808 and later to the Lewis family of Henllan. In 1874, architect John Pollard Seddon was employed to undertake renovations and alterations to the building, extending the earlier L-shaped house in a neo-Gothic style.

By the early 21st century, the property had fallen into disrepair. Neil and Zoe Kedward acquired the estate in 2007 and began a programme of restoration. Contemporary accounts describe the house as derelict at the time of purchase, with damage to the roof and windows and overgrown grounds.

The Grove opened in June 2008 with four bedrooms. The business initially operated on a bed-and-breakfast basis, with Neil Kedward working as the chef, before developing into a larger hotel operation.

== Hotel ==
The Grove has 25 bedrooms and suites located in the main house and buildings within the estate. The hotel is set within approximately 26 acres of gardens, woodland and meadows, including a historic walled garden and kitchen garden.

The hotel has undergone continuing refurbishment since its acquisition by the Kedwards. Interior designer Martin Hulbert began working with the hotel in 2016, and refurbishment has included guest rooms and other areas of the property.

The hotel is part of the Seren Collection, a hospitality group owned by Neil and Zoe Kedward.

== Restaurants ==
The Grove operates two restaurants, the fine-dining Fernery and the more informal Artisan Rooms.

Fernery is a fine-dining restaurant led by executive chef Douglas Balish. It has 28 covers and has been awarded four AA Rosettes. Artisan Rooms is a larger, more informal restaurant with approximately 60 covers.

The restaurants make use of locally sourced and seasonal ingredients, with produce from the hotel's kitchen garden also used in the kitchens.

In 2025, Balish was named Hotel Chef of the Year (fewer than 250 covers) at the Hotel Cateys.

== Sustainability ==
The Grove has received recognition for its environmental practices. It received a Green Tourism Gold Award in 2018, and its sustainability work was recognised at the 2021 United Nations Climate Change Conference (COP26).

== Reviews ==
The Telegraph reviewed the business, scoring 8 out of 10 overall, describing it as "arguably Pembrokeshire's smartest country-house hotel". The style, character and the two restaurants scored 9 out of 10.

In 2022 the reviewer from The Times gave an overall score of 7 out of 10 for the venue, though 8 out of 10 for the hotel's rooms with particular mention for the John Pollard Seddon room and the self-contained cottages with their private gardens.

== Awards and recognition ==
The Grove has received a number of hospitality and tourism awards and distinctions.

- 2015 – Pride of Britain Hotel of the Year
- 2015 – Welsh Hotel of the Year
- 2018 – Green Tourism Gold Award
- Travellers’ Choice Best of the Best Hotels 2023
- 2022 – Hotel of the Year – Independent, Hotel Cateys
- 2024 – Independent Hotel of the Year, Independent Hotel Show Awards
- 2025 – 17th place among hotels in the United Kingdom in the Condé Nast Traveller Readers' Choice Awards, with a score of 96.93
- 2025 – Douglas Balish, Hotel Chef of the Year (fewer than 250 covers), Hotel Cateys
- 2026 – Tripadvisor Travellers' Choice Best of the Best
