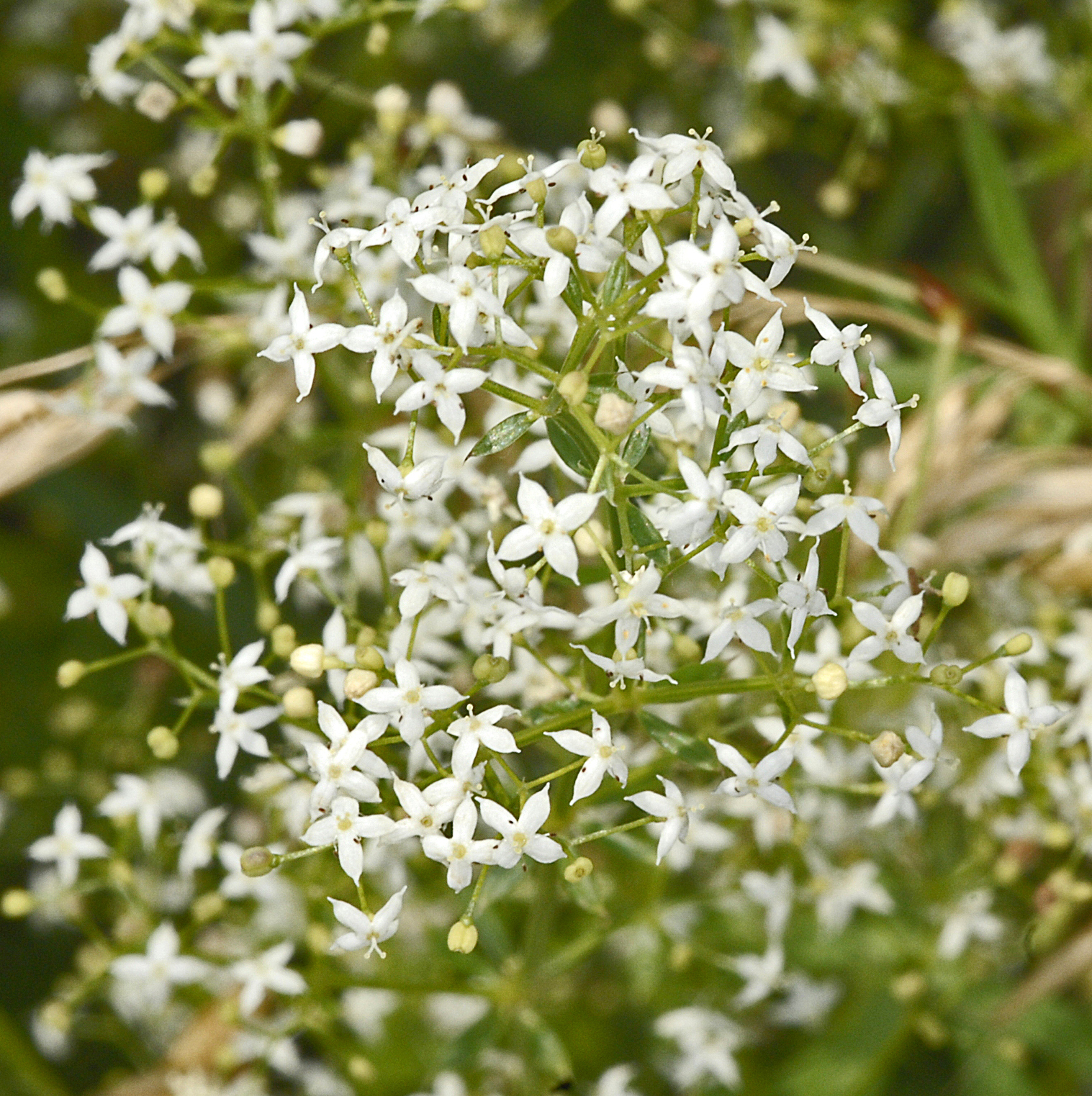

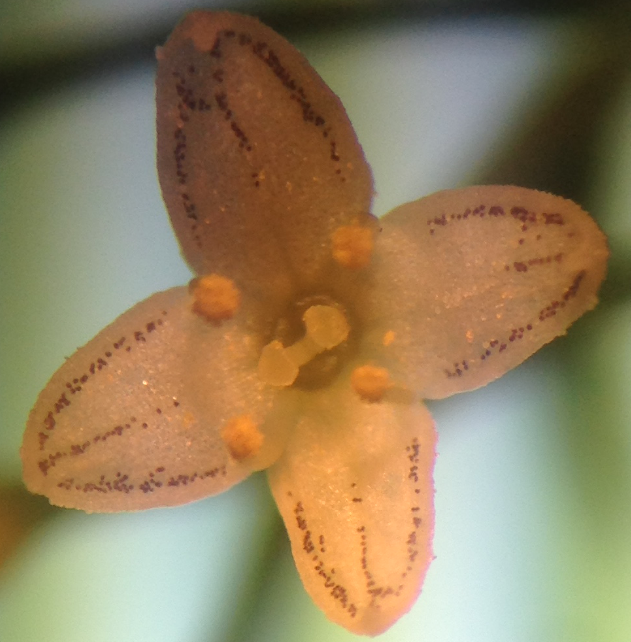
- Close up image of the Galium mollugo flower under a dissecting microscope

Scientific classification
- Kingdom: Plantae
- Clade: Tracheophytes
- Clade: Angiosperms
- Clade: Eudicots
- Clade: Asterids
- Order: Gentianales
- Family: Rubiaceae
- Genus: Galium
- Species: G. mollugo

Binomial name
- Galium mollugo L.

Synonyms
- Galium erectum Huds.; Galium mollugo subsp. erectum (Huds.) Briq.; Galium mollugo var. erectum (Huds.) Domin; Rubia mollugo (L.) Baillon

= Galium mollugo =

Hedge bedstraw

Species of plant

Galium mollugo, common name hedge bedstraw or false baby's breath, is a herbaceous perennial plant of the family Rubiaceae. It shares the name hedge bedstraw with the related European species, Galium album.

== Description ==
Galium mollugo can reach a height of 15–100 cm (5.9–39.4 in). The stems are square in cross-section, more or less erect, with ascending branches. Starting from the axils of leaves, it has inflorescences of small, white flowers with a diameter around 1.0 to 1.5 cm, with four petals. Its flowering period extends from May to September in the Northern Hemisphere.

== Habitat ==
Galium mollugo commonly occurs in hedges, bushes, paths, meadows, and slopes, at elevations up to 2,100 m (6,900 ft) above sea level.

== Distribution ==
Galium mollugo is widely distributed in Europe and North Africa from Denmark to Portugal and Morocco, east to the Altay region of Siberia, and to the Caucasus. It is naturalized in the Russian Far East, New Zealand, Norfolk Island, Greenland, Argentina, Uruguay, and much of North America. It has been reported from the Rocky Mountains, the Cascade Range, the Sierra Nevadas, and the Appalachian Mountains, as well as the Great Lakes region. It is classified as a noxious weed in New York, Pennsylvania, and much of New England.
