= Plas Bodegroes =

Coordinates: 52.8897°N 4.4466°W

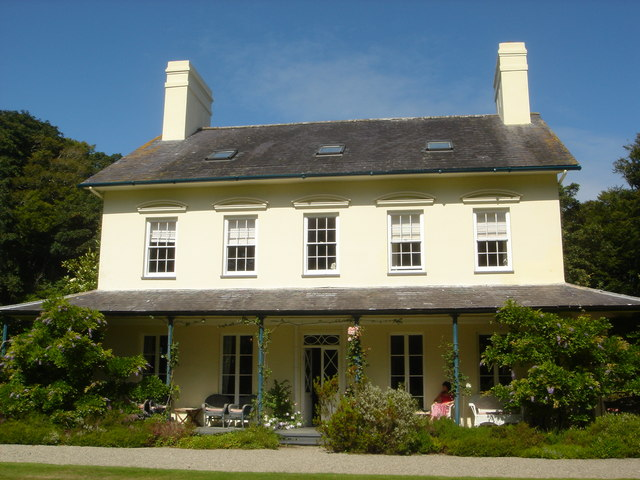
Plas Bedegroes

Plas Bodegroes is a former Georgian country house which stands in its own grounds near Pwllheli, Gwynedd on the Llŷn Peninsula. The grade II* listed building, previously a restaurant, is now a self catering holiday home.

The house was built in 1780 for William Griffith (1748–1816), probably designed by Joseph Bromfield, and probably incorporating elements of a previous house. It is built in two storeys with attics, rendered and painted white. Like the other two houses thought to have been designed by Bromfield (Broom Hall and Nanhoron), the house has a long verandah at the rear supported by elegant iron pillars. A notable feature of the grounds is the avenue of beech trees leading up to the house. By the end of the 19th century the house belonged to a John Savin. In the 1940s it belonged to a show-business dancer who created a Japanese garden at the rear. The gardens are designated Grade II on the Cadw/ICOMOS Register of Parks and Gardens of Special Historic Interest in Wales.

Until 2006, it was Wales' only Michelin Starred restaurant, and the only 5-star rated restaurant with a hotel in Wales. It lost its Michelin star in 2009.
