= Eglwys Fach =

Village in Ceredigion, Wales

Coordinates: 52°32′35″N 3°56′14″W

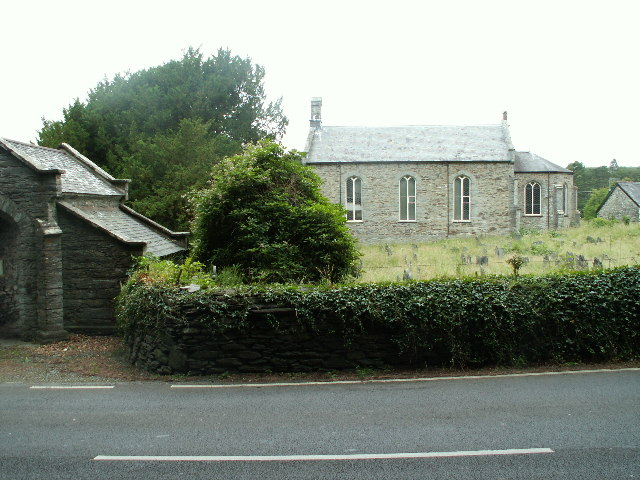
St Michael's Church

Eglwys Fach, also known as Eglwys-fach or Eglwysfach, is a small village, roughly 12 miles (19 km) outside of Aberystwyth, Ceredigion, Wales. It is known for being the home of Welsh poet R. S. Thomas from 1954 who was vicar of St Michael's Church until 1967. The village hosts the R. S. Thomas Festival and Poetry Competition every year to celebrate the poet's works.

The Michelin starred restaurant and hotel, Ynyshir, is located just outside the village. Because of its isolated location some visitors arrive by helicopter.
