= The Whitebrook =

Restaurant in the United Kingdom

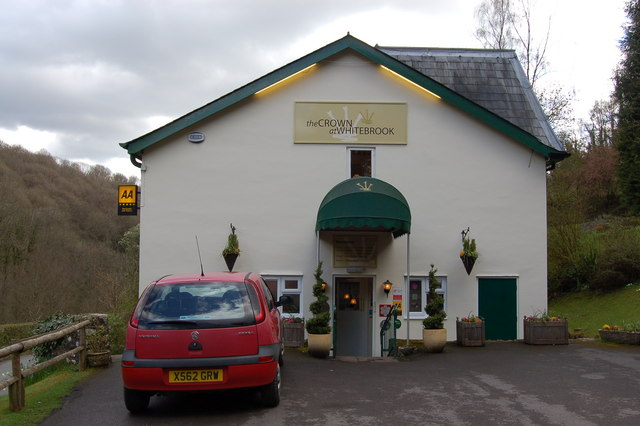
- The Crown at Whitebrook in 2008

- Location in Monmouthshire

Restaurant information
- Established: October 2013 (Under current ownership)
- Owner: Chris Harrod
- Previous owner: James Sommerin
- Chef: Chris Harrod
- Food type: British cuisine
- Rating: (Michelin Guide 2020)
- Location: Whitebrook, Monmouthshire, Wales
- Coordinates: 51°45′34″N 2°41′11″W
- Seating capacity: 34 covers
- Website: www.thewhitebrook.co.uk

The Whitebrook, formerly known as The Crown at Whitebrook, is a restaurant with rooms in Whitebrook, 6 miles (9.7 km) south-south-east of Monmouth, Monmouthshire, Wales, near the River Wye and the border with England. The building is thought to date from the 17th century and by the 19th century it was used as a roadside inn. Its restaurant was run by Chef Patron James Sommerin until 2013; it gained a Michelin star in 2007. It contains eight double rooms and a 2-acre (0.81 ha) garden.

On 7 March 2013, it closed because of financial difficulties; at the time it had the longest held Michelin star in Wales. Critics praised the food under Sommerin, but have criticised the difficulty in finding the restaurant. It re-opened in October 2013 under new chef and owner Chris Harrod, and regained the Michelin star in 2014. Harrod serves a menu using locally produced meat and vegetables along with foraged ingredients such as charlock, hedge bedstraw and pennywort.

== Description ==
The Whitebrook is a restaurant with rooms located 6 miles (9.7 km) south-south-east of Monmouth in Monmouthshire, Wales. It is near the River Wye and the border with England. It is located on a minor road running between Lydart and the A466 road at Bigsweir. The restaurant can seat up to 34 customers, and the kitchen is run by four staff plus Harrod. In addition to the restaurant itself, there are eight double rooms; as of 2016, four had been recently renovated. They each look out over either the adjoining garden or the valley. It had previously operated with a further bedroom under the previous owner. There is also an apartment onsite for the manager of the premises. The building has an adjoined garden of 2-acre (0.81 ha).

=== Menu ===
The menu under Chris Harrod is seasonal, using locally produced meat and vegetables. Tasting menu dishes include asparagus which comes from the nearby Wye Valley, while turbot from Cornwall is used. There are foraged items included in the menu, such as hedge bedstraw and pennywort. Charlock is served with crab, while hogweed is used in an asparagus based dish. He uses foams on dishes, including on a Jerusalem artichoke starter comprising caramelized artichokes with goat's curd, trompette mushrooms and Parmigiano-Reggiano.

Another dish which highlights local vegetables is a salt baked turnip side which accompanies duck. Harrod explained "Turnips don't deserve their unloved image, they add a wonderful freshness to a dish." The signature of the restaurant is a suckling pig themed dish, incorporating a pork shoulder which is cooked over two days in a bain-marie, served with shallot and mugwort. This is accompanied by a croquette made from pig's head and a pork cutlet with celeriac, pear, sorrel and cauliflower mushrooms. The restaurant serves breakfast to residents staying in the rooms, which includes Trealy Farm produced sausages and bacon.

== History ==
The restaurant claims that the building dates from the 17th century, although little is known of its history. The village of Whitebrook developed as a centre of water-powered industry, with wireworks and later paper mills. The Whitebrook was run as a roadside inn by the Seaward family, and later the Ricketts family, in the second half of the 19th century.

It remained in use as a small public house, until it was extensively refurbished and reopened as a high quality restaurant. For a number of years it was owned by the Jackson brothers. John Jackson had previously been a sommelier at La Gavroche for around 6 years and presented the public face of the Crown, while his brother was chef. It was awarded a coveted Michelin star in 2007, one of thirteen newly starred restaurants in the UK in that year's Guide. In 2010, Martin Blunos joined Crown restaurants as executive chef of the group which oversaw both the Crown at Whitebrook and the Crown at Celtic Manor. That same year, it won a Gold Award from Visit Wales for the rooms on site. As of 2011 it was one of only four establishments in Wales to hold a Michelin star. During the same year, it was named the Welsh Restaurant of the Year by the AA. In 2012, it was ranked as the 27th best restaurant in the UK by the Good Food Guide with a score of seven out of ten.

It closed on 7 March 2013 due to financial difficulties; twenty staff were reported to have lost their jobs. The closure was blamed on recent poor weather, and on economic circumstances. In April 2013, the building was marketed for sale for £850,000 or for a yearly lease with an upfront payment of £50,000. At the time it had been the longest standing Michelin starred restaurant in Wales.

In August 2013, it was announced that it would reopen in October under a new chef-owner, Chris Harrod. Harrod had previously worked under Raymond Blanc at two Michelin starred restaurant Le Manoir aux Quat'Saisons. He had been looking for a restaurant with rooms to purchase, having originally thought to look for one in the Chiltern Hills where they could be added. Harrod said that "I went and had a look and was amazed to find that the Crown at Whitebrook ticked all the boxes for what I was looking for. It had the location, the quality suppliers and I knew straight away that I had been looking in the wrong place." The Crown at Whitebrook reopened the following October, and gained a new Michelin star under the new team in the 2014 list. In February 2015, the restaurant was renamed to The Whitebrook.

== Reception ==
=== Under Sommerin ===
Victor Lewis-Smith reviewed the restaurant for The Guardian in 2005, thought that a spring onion risotto accompaniment to a pan fried seabass tasted so good that it would have been sufficient as a main course itself and was also quite pleased that crêpe suzette was served on a trolley for table side service. Claire Ogden visited the restaurant for the Metro newspaper shortly after it was first awarded a Michelin star in 2007. She thought that a John Dory main course was "pristine", and overall thought that the star was well deserved. The only negative thing she had to say about the experience was a toffee foam served on top of a pear granita which she described as "flimsy-flavoured". It was named the best restaurant in Britain by Les Routiers later that year. The critic from the Western Mail stated in 2008 that "the menu is short and to the point, with around five choices for each course. The wine list is huge, an insurmountable challenge for me but another's utopia." However, he remarked that the main course was "genuinely brilliant food" and deserving of its Michelin star.

It was awarded the wine award for Wales by The AA in 2008. Matthew Fort of The Guardian described its location in 2009, "The Crown is not the easiest place in the world to find. It lies off a narrow lane winding between steepling, canopied hills in an odd corner between Monmouth and Chepstow. In spite of its lost world location, the Crown has been a beacon of gastronomic adventure for at least 30 years – those with long memories will recall Stephen Bull carving out his reputation here." He said of the food, "There is clearly a distinctive palate at work here. In lesser hands, such a meal could be not so much a car crash as a multiple pile-up, but it is not, because the ingredients are handled with originality, assurance and, more importantly, a keen sense of pleasure."

=== Under Harrod ===
Tony Naylor, writing for The Guardian in 2016, said that the menu featured unusual ingredients which complement each other resulting in "astonishing depths of flavour". Some dishes he considered less successful; a broccoli amuse-bouche was likened to "a car veering on to a motorway’s rumble strips". The Whitebrook has retained the Michelin star through to 2016, which it first earned under Harrod in 2014.
