= Greek festival =

Celebration of Greek culture

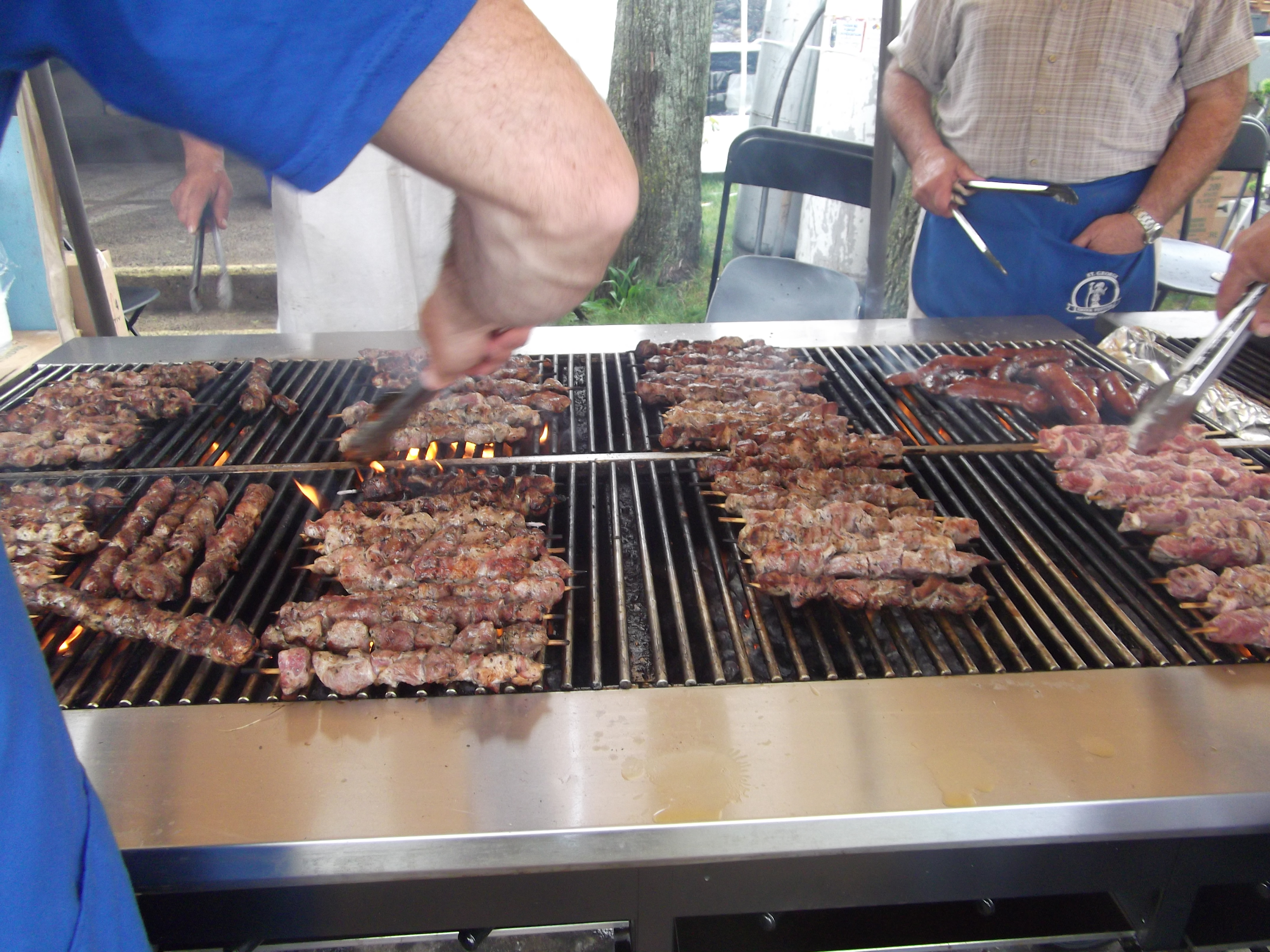
Souvlaki grilling at the 2011 Greek festival in Piscataway, New Jersey on May 15, 2011

A Greek festival or Greek Fest is an annual celebration of Greek culture presented by many ethnic Greek American communities and organizations in the United States, Canada, Australia, New Zealand, the United Kingdom, Germany, Norway, the United Arab Emirates, Singapore, Argentina, Brazil, and other countries with Greek populations, particularly Greek Orthodox churches. Typically, these events are intended for attendance by the general public.

Attendees can sample Greek music, movies, cuisine, and dance, typically performed in traditional dress. Such events are often fundraisers for Orthodox churches of the Greek Archdiocese.

These Greek festivals originate from celebrations in Greece for religious holidays, such as, Greek Orthodox Easter and non-religious holidays, such as, the Festival of Flowers (Protomayia).

Greek foods often served at Greek festivals include lamb, Greek salad with olives and feta cheese, dolmades, spanakopita, tiropita, and Greek coffee. Sweets include baklava, loukoumades, diples, galaktoboureko, koulorakia, and kourabiedes.

In a modern context, the term "Greek Fest" is also used to refer to the celebrations or festivities organized and held by college/university fraternities and sororities (Greek system organizations) in North America.

== See also ==
- Athenian festivals, for a list of festivals celebrated in ancient Greece
- Let's Go Greek Festival, for a Greek festival in Sydney
- Greek Food Festival (Tallahassee)
- Portland Greek Festival
- Greek Food Festival of Dallas
- Edinburgh Greek Festival
- Paniyiri Greek Festival, for a Greek festival in Brisbane
- Gold Coast Greek Festival
