= Greek Food Festival of Dallas =

The Greek Food Festival of Dallas is a food festival held annually in Dallas, Texas (USA), featuring traditional Greek cuisine and Greek culture.

The Festival was first held in Dallas in 1956 and having celebrated its 50th anniversary in 2006, the Greek Food Festival has grown into an event of national importance, featuring the best of Greek dinners, homemade pastries, wines, Greek music and dances. In addition to this, the spectators have a chance to learn more of Greek history and culture and enjoy cooking demonstrations from Dallas chefs. There was no festival in 2020 as the COVID-19 pandemic was to blame; the 65th is deferred to 2021.

Like the majority of Greek festivals, which are organized by the Greek Orthodox Church, Greek Food Festival of Dallas is also organized by the Holy Trinity Greek Orthodox Church.

== See also ==
- Food festival
- Posen Potato Festival
- Puerto Vallarta festival
- Howell Melon Festival
- Gilroy Garlic Festival
- Brentwood Cornfest
- Castroville Artichoke Festival
