= Food festival =

Festival that uses food as its theme

A food festival is a festival, that features food, often produce, as its central theme. These festivals have been a means of uniting communities through celebrations of harvests and giving thanks for a plentiful growing season.

== History ==
Food festivals throughout the world are often based on traditional farming techniques and the seasons of the year. Food festivals are related to food culture of an area, whether through the preparation of food served or the time period in which the festival is celebrated. Food festivals are considered strengthening agents for local cultural heritage, and simultaneously celebrate this cultural heritage while also commodifying it for a national or international audience. While historically aligned with culturally significant food harvesting periods, contemporary food festivals are usually associated with businesses entities or nonprofit organizations and engage a great deal of marketing for their festivals, since their success is measured off how much revenue they generate for the local community, region, or entity putting on the event. Modern food festivals are also a large part of the food tourism industry, which uses food festivals and regional cuisine to support the broader tourism industry of a particular locality.

== Food tourism ==
Food festivals are quickly becoming part of a vast food tourism industry. Food tourism itself has become an important part of the tourism industry worldwide, and the presence of food festivals shown to support local industry development. Food festivals are an important part of destination branding for many regions, creating an event-based reason for individuals to visit otherwise unattractive localities and promote local products and services outside of an urban product environment. Several case studies have shown that food festivals can potentially improve social sustainability while also heavily supporting the tourism and hospitality industries. Food tourism is also an important reason why people attend food festivals around the world. Studies have shown that engagement with food tourism indicates that an individual will attend festivals again in the future, indicating a cooperative element to food tourism and food festival attendance.

== List of food and drink festivals ==
=== Africa ===
Festival name	Type	Country/city	Since	Notes
Lagos Seafood Festival	Fish festival	Nigeria		
Leboku	festival	Nigeria		
New Yam Festival of the Igbo	festival	Nigeria		
Nnewi Afiaolu Festival	festival	Nigeria		
Ashanti Yam Festival	festival	Ghana		
Asogli Yam Festival	festival	Ghana		
Fofie Yam Festival	festival	Ghana		
Kavala Fresk Feastival	Fish festival	Cape Verde / Mindelo	2013	

=== Oceania ===
Festival name	Type	Country/city	Since	Notes
Bankstown Bites Food Festival	Food	Australia		
Hokitika Wildfoods Festival	Food	New Zealand		
Caxton Street Seafood and Wine Festival	Wine festival/Food	Australia		
Good Food & Wine Show	Wine festival/Food	Australia		
Grampians Grape Escape	Wine festival	Australia		
Kings Cross Food and Wine Festival	Wine festival/Food	Australia		
Melbourne Food and Wine Festival	Wine festival/Food	Australia		
Tasting Australia	Food	Adelaide Australia	1997	
Taste Festival	Food	Australia		
Vegfest (AU)	Food	Australia		
Darwin Beer Can Regatta	Beer festival	Australia		
GABS Hottest 100 Aussie Craft Beers of the Year	Beer festival	Australia		
Great Australasian Beer SpecTAPular	Beer festival	Australia		
Schützenfest (Adelaide)	Beer festival	Australia		
Warners Bay Beer Festival	Beer festival	Australia		
Taste of Tasmania	Food	Australia	1988	
Wellington On a Plate	Food	New Zealand	2009	
Beervana	Beer Festival	New Zealand	2001	

=== North America ===
==== Canada ====
See List of food festivals in Canada.

==== Mexico ====
- Puerto Vallarta festival

==== United States ====
There are several Florida food festivals and New Jersey food festivals. Other festivals include 626 Night Market in Arcadia, California; the National Cherry Festival in Traverse City, Michigan; Brentwood Cornfest in Brentwood, California; Mushroom Festivals in various locales; the Castroville Artichoke Festival, in Castroville, California; the Stockton Asparagus Festival, in Stockton, California; the ¡Latin Food Festival! in San Diego, California; the Lexington Barbecue Festival in North Carolina; the Posen Potato Festival, in Posen, Michigan; the Norwalk Oyster Festival, in Norwalk, Connecticut, Vaisakhi Festival in Yuba City, California, and the Howell Melon Festival in Howell, Michigan, known for electing the Howell Melon Queen.

Vegetarian food festivals include VegFests in Boston, Massachusetts; Salt Lake City, Utah; and San Francisco, California; Seattle, Washington; including the premier Boston Vegetarian Food Festival in autumn, an event originally copied from the then already longstanding Toronto Vegetarian Food Fair in Toronto, Ontario. The List of vegetarian festivals includes hundreds of such events in North America, and hundreds elsewhere, also.

=== Asia ===
Festival name	Type	Country/city	Since	Notes
Jakarta Fashion & Food Festival		Indonesia		
Thapar Food Festival		India		
Osho Monsoon Festival	festival	India		
Qatar International Food Festival	festival	Qatar	2009	

=== South America ===
Festival name	Type	Country/city	Since	Notes
Festival de comida de rua Fortaleza	festival	Brazil / Fortaleza		
Festival de comida de rua São Paulo	festival	Brazil / São Paulo		
Mistura	festival	Peru / Lima	2008	the largest food festival in Latin America. Held annually.

=== Europe ===
==== Italy ====
- Asti's Festival of Festivals held in Asti in September.
- Battle of the Oranges is a traditional orange fight held in Ivrea each February.
- Cibus

==== Spain ====
- La Tomatina - a tomato-throwing festival held in late August in Buñol.
- L’Aplec del Caragol - a snail-eating festival held in Lleida in May.

==== Switzerland ====
- The Räbechilbi turnip festival is held annually in September.
- A cheese festival is held in Gruyére in May.

== See also ==
- List of dining events
