= Bole Festival =

Annual food festival held in Port Harcourt, Nigeria

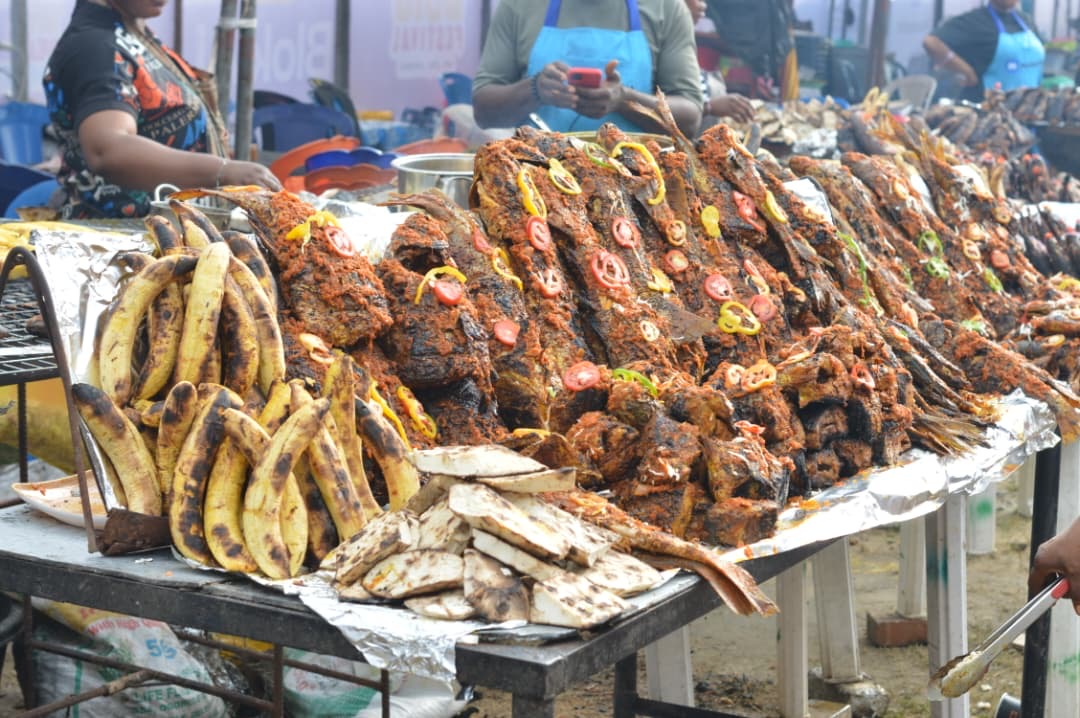
- Bole, yam and fish at the 2025 Bole festival in Port Harcourt
- Status: active
- Genre: Food festival
- Frequency: Annually
- Location: Rivers
- Country: Nigeria
- Inaugurated: 2016
- Founder: Kennedy Nonso Iwuh
- Participants: 25,000

Bole Festival is a multi-day annual Rivers food festival held in Port Harcourt. The maiden edition was held in 2016 in Port Harcourt. At the event, buyers are treated to different delicacies of traditional southern Nigeria food.

== Origin ==
"Boli" popularly known as "Bole" in Southsouthern part of the country, originated from Yorubaland.

Bole is a traditional name of a popular street delicacy blend of roasted plantain, potatoes, yam, fresh fish and pepper sauce.This delicacy is prepared in the local way using firewood and roasted for consumption. It is enjoyed by the locals and other Nigerians especially in the southern part of the country.

The festival is always held every year. The Bole festival which began in 2016, is done to celebrate Port Harcourt street food as well as showcase its rich culture and popular foods of the southern heritage or culture. The Bole festival attracts various food lovers, communities, culture, brands, to celebrate its distinctive food culture each year.

The festival was founded by Kennedy Nonso Iwuh.

== Activities ==
Besides the preparation and consumption of the local delicacy, other aspects of the festival include exhibitions from food vendors and international food enthusiasts and chefs. Also, there is performance from different artistes in Nigeria who come to thrill and entertain the crowd at the festival.

With rapid growth over the years, Bole Festival is attracting many sponsors, including:

1. Budweiser
2. Hero
3. Tecno
4. Indomie Noodles
5. Mtn
6. Malta
7. Maggi
8. Lacasera
9. Red Bull Energy Drink

== 2019 Edition ==
The 2019 edition of the Bole Festival, themed: Our Taste, Our Culture, was the fourth edition of the event. It was held on the 3rd of August 2019 at Obiwali Event Centre in Port Harcourt, Rivers State, and featured over 200 vendor stalls.

== 2022 Edition ==
The 2022 edition of the Bole Festival, themed: Level Up, was the sixth iteration of the event. It was held on the 6th - 7 August 2022 at the Yakubu Gowon Stadium in Port Harcourt, Rivers State. The festival drew over 28,000 attendees and showcased more than 100 food vendors.

== 2023 Edition ==
The 2023 edition of the Bole Festival, which was the seventh edition of the event, was held on 5–6 August 2023 at Yakubu Gowon Stadium in Port Harcourt. The festival was themed Flavours of South-South and featured food vendors, cultural displays, and entertainment activities, with support from several corporate sponsors.

== 2025 Edition ==
The 2025 Bole Festival was held at Yakubu Gowon Stadium, Port Harcourt, on 6–7 September 2025, tagged One bite, one beat, one moment, had an attendance of over 25,000 people.

Highlights included live performances, dance, and expanded food exhibitions. Each year introduces new entertainment features alongside traditional bole delicacies.

The Bole festival 2026

== 2025 Gallery ==
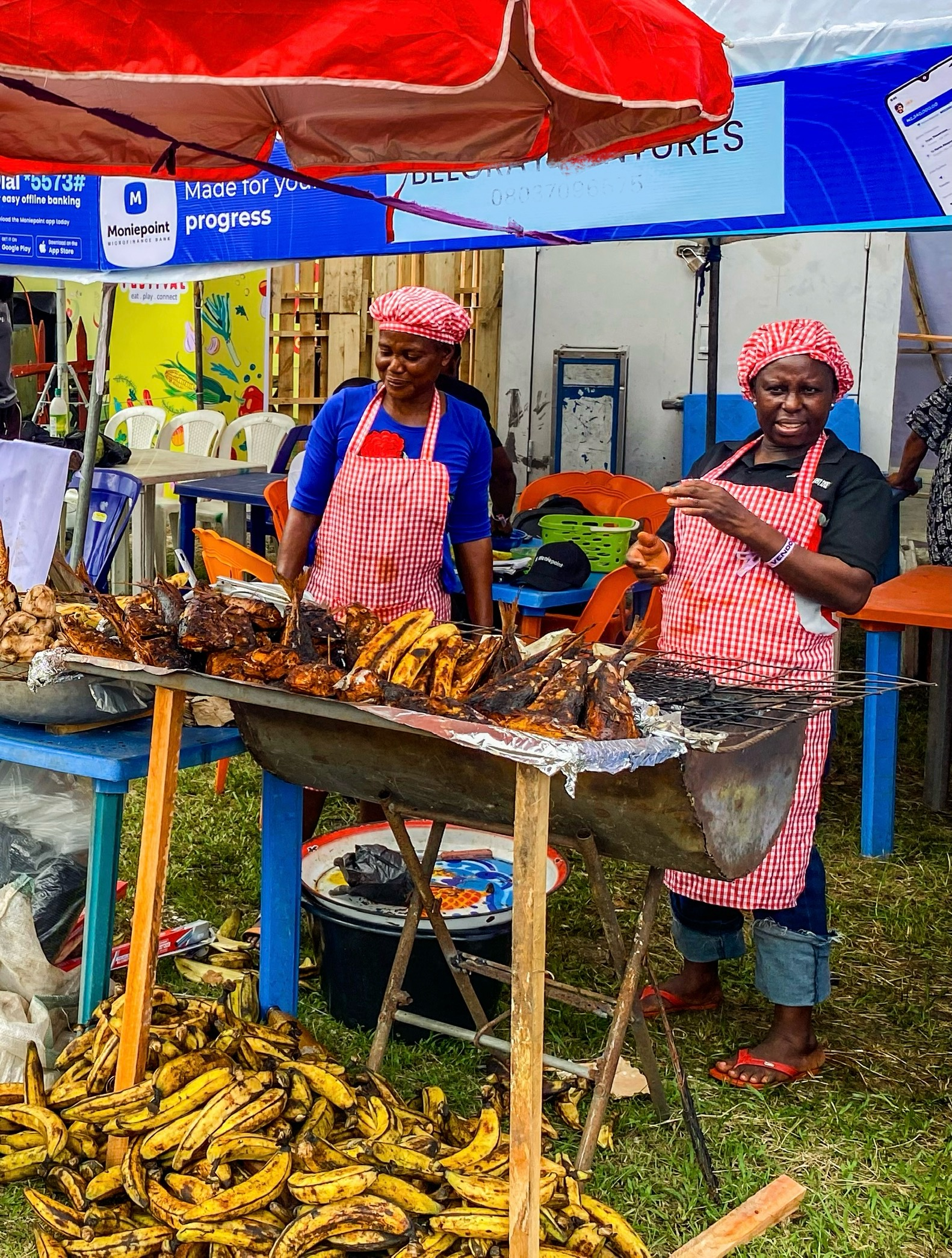

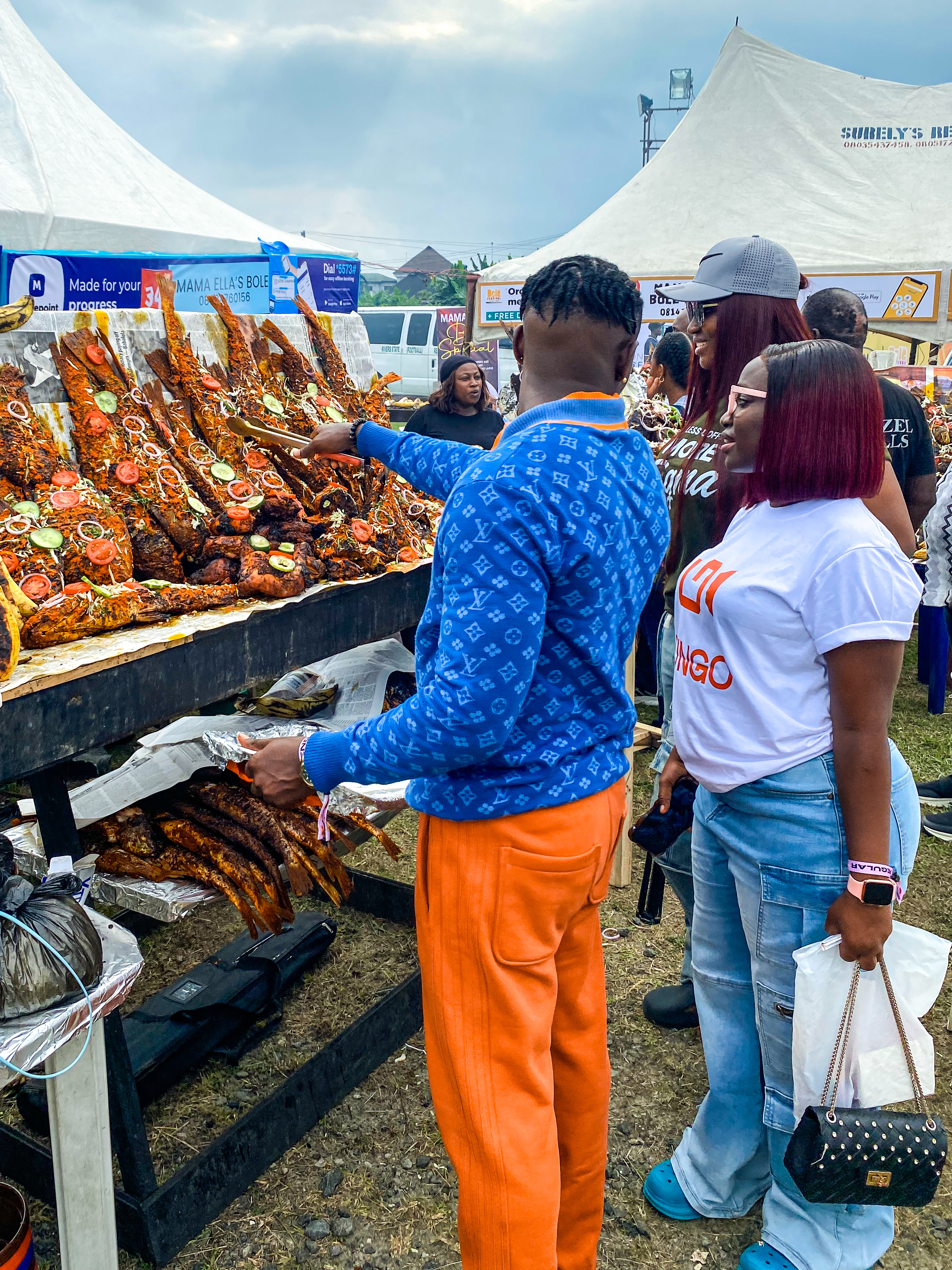

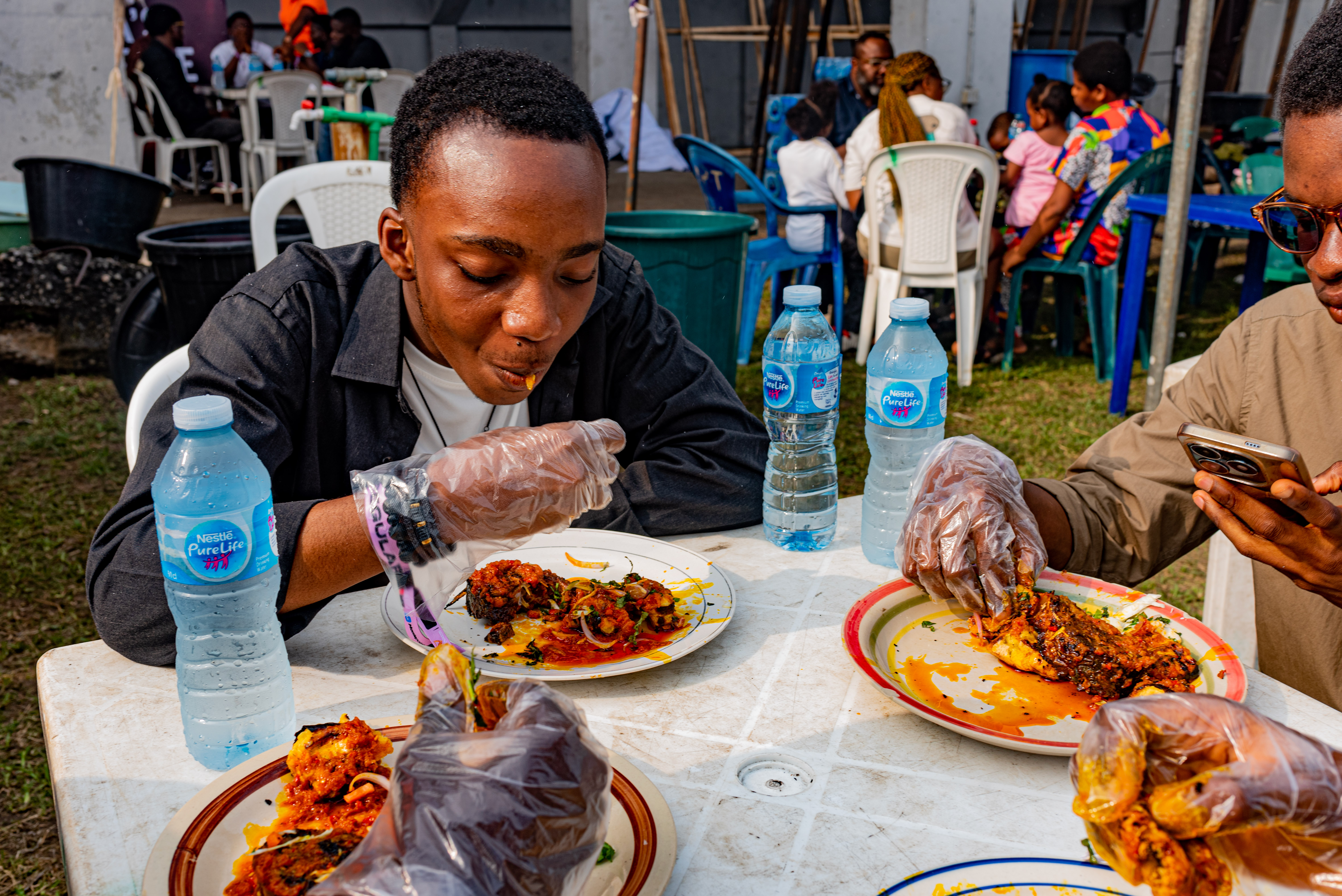

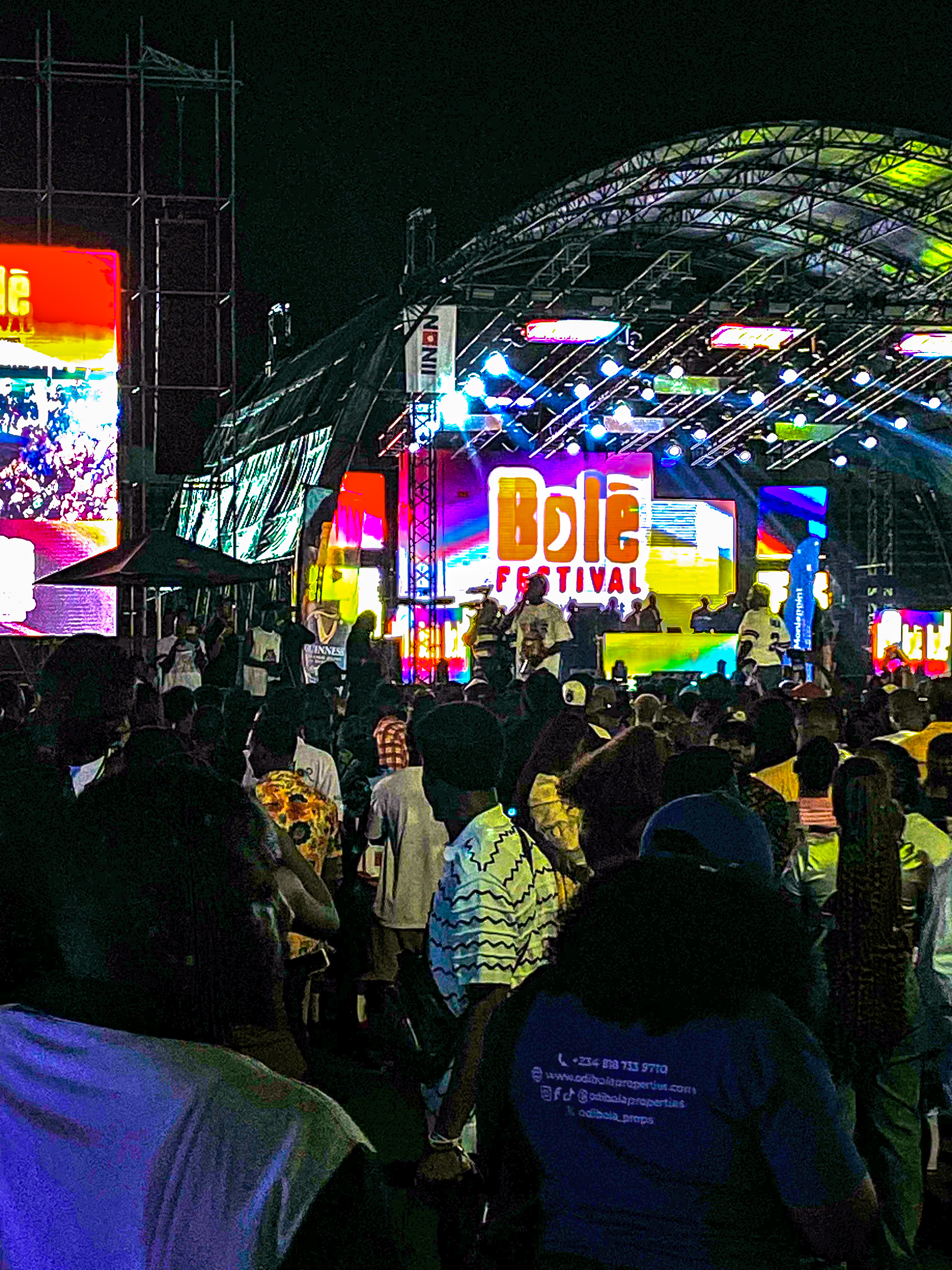

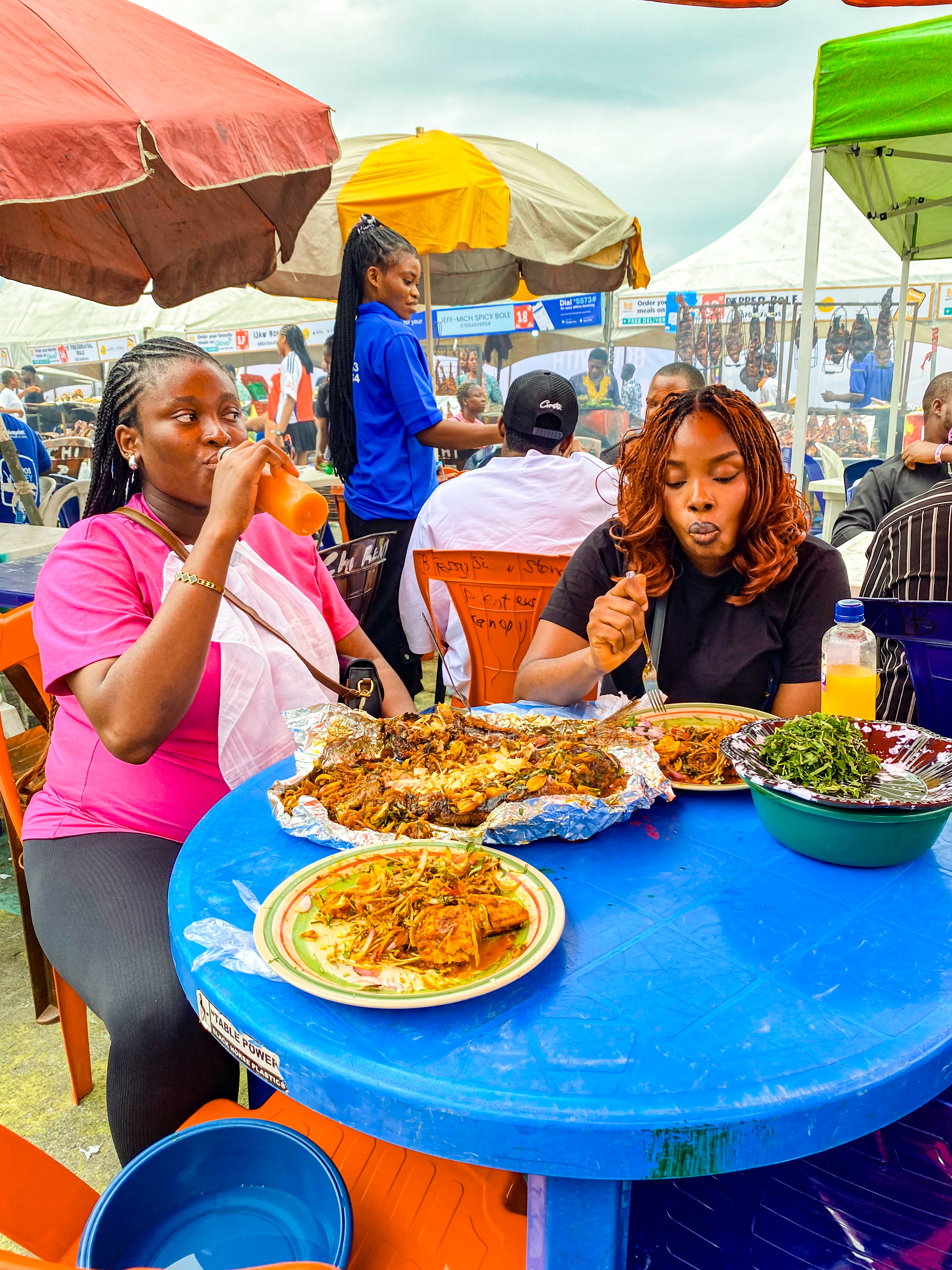

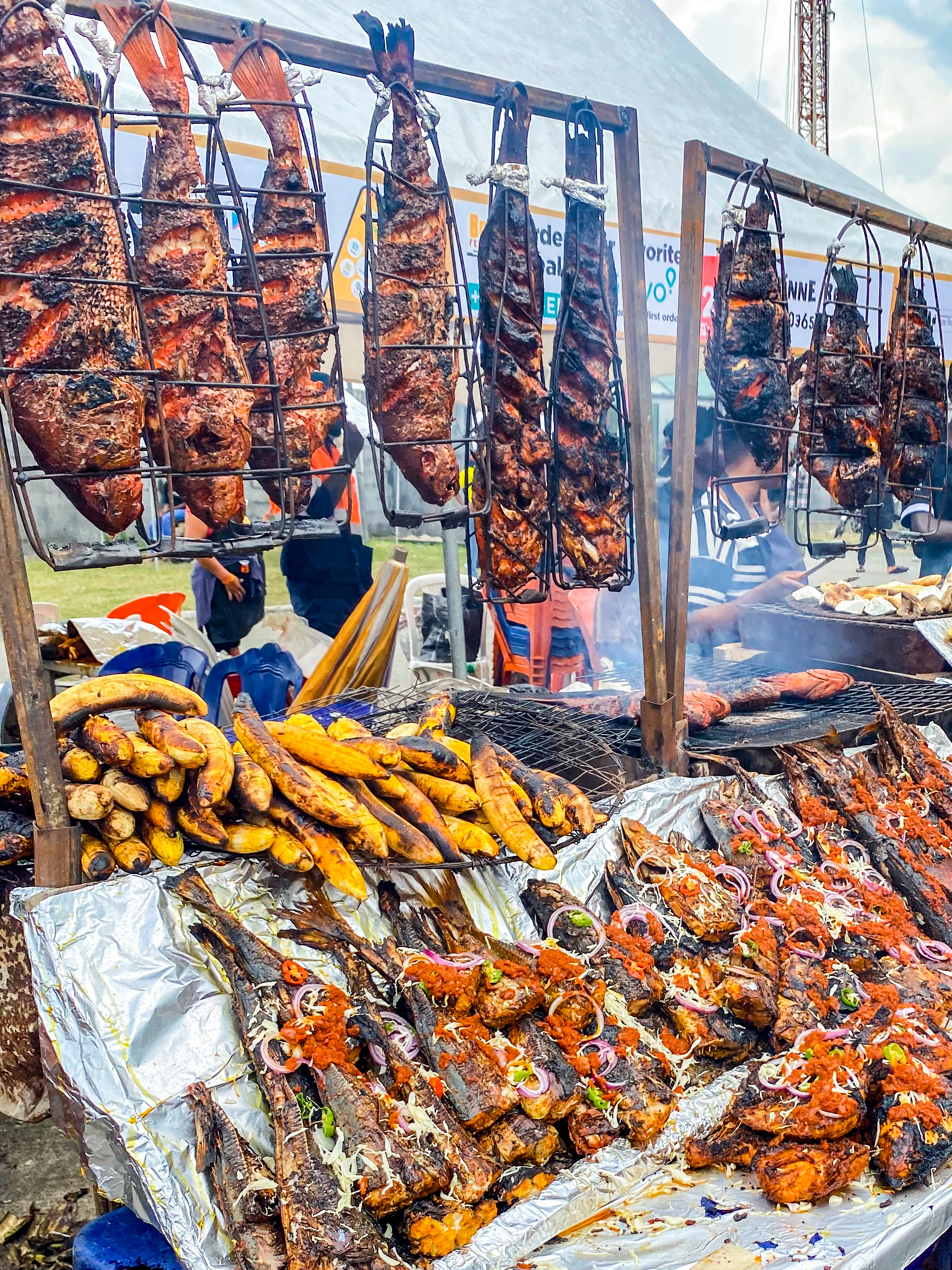

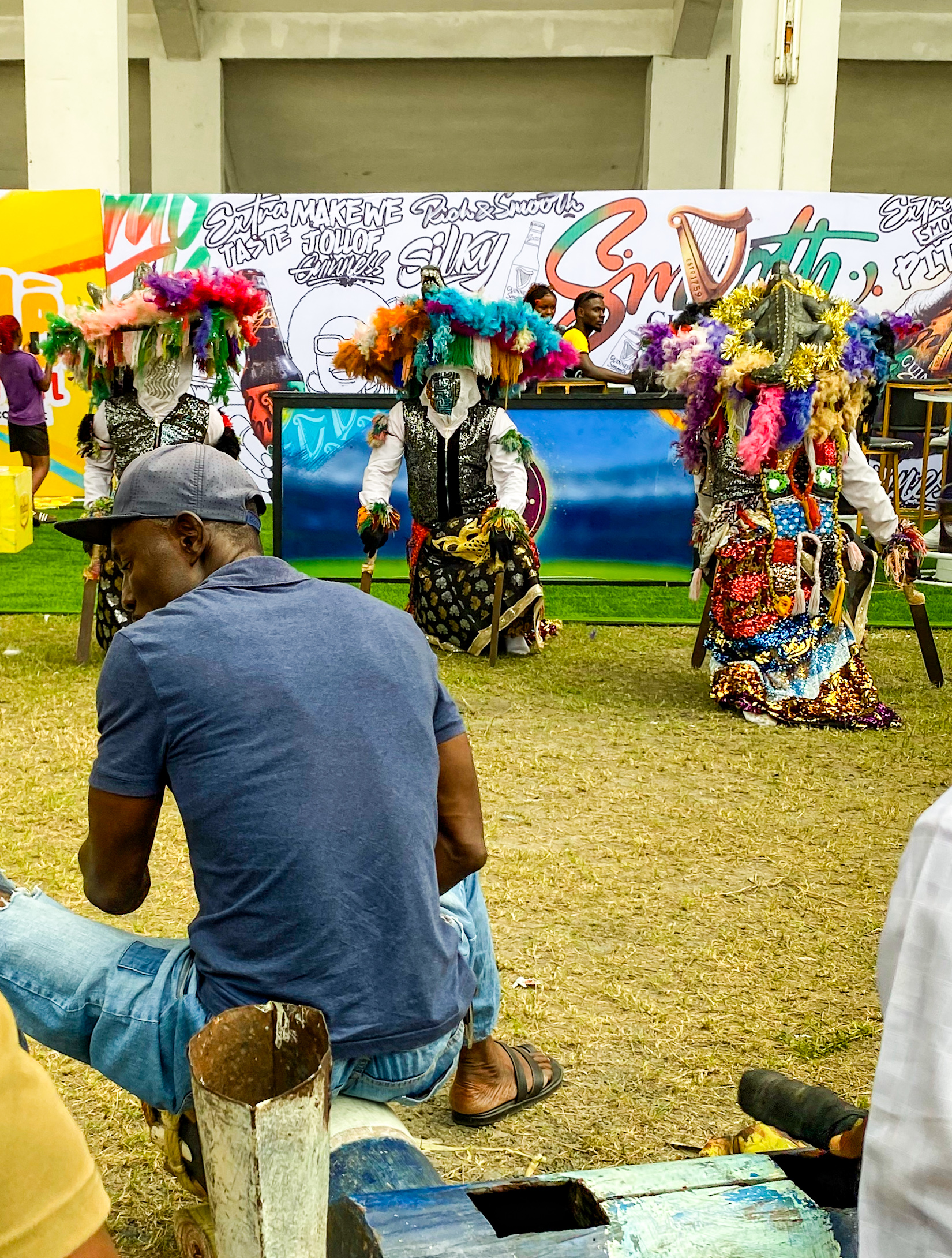

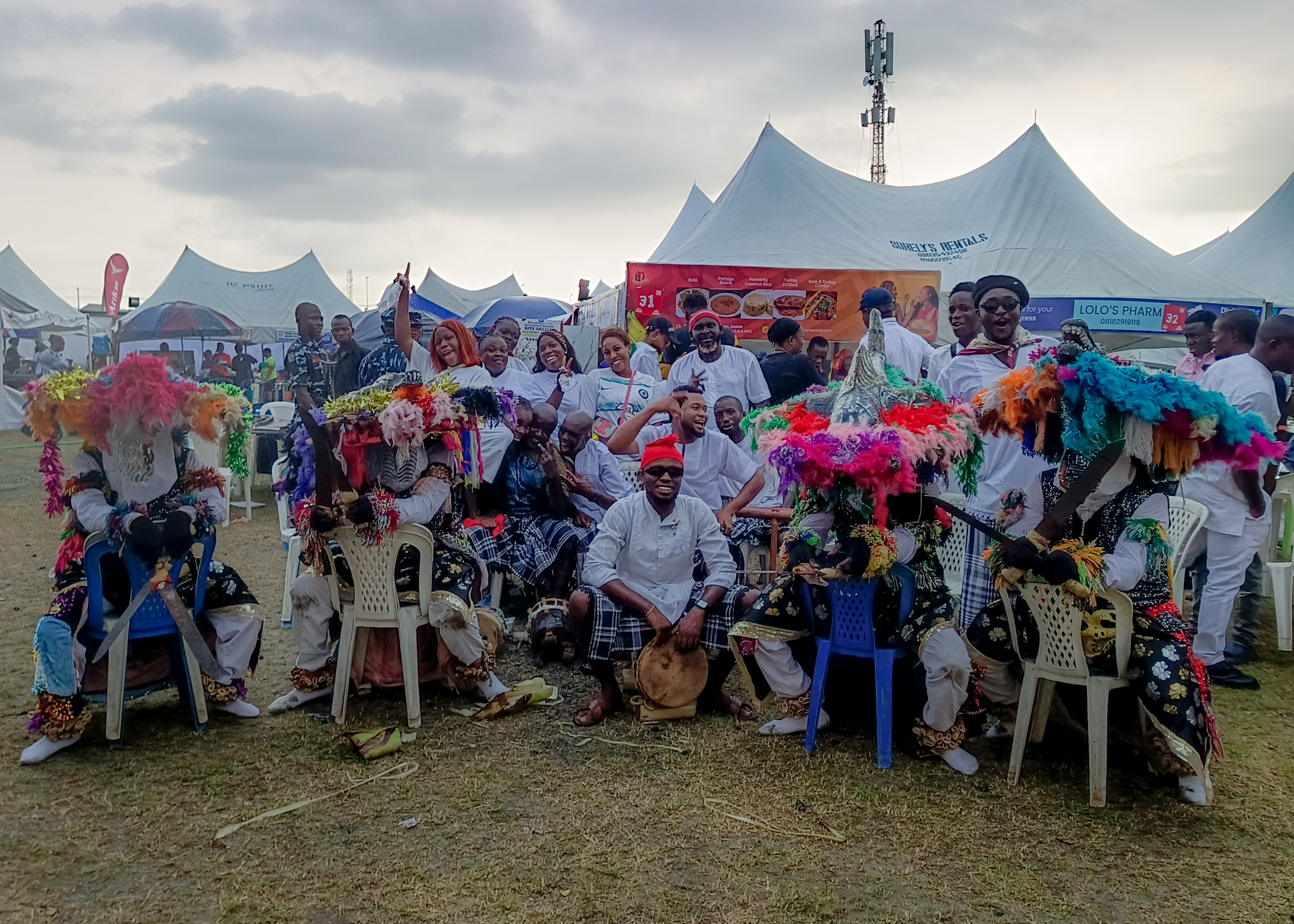

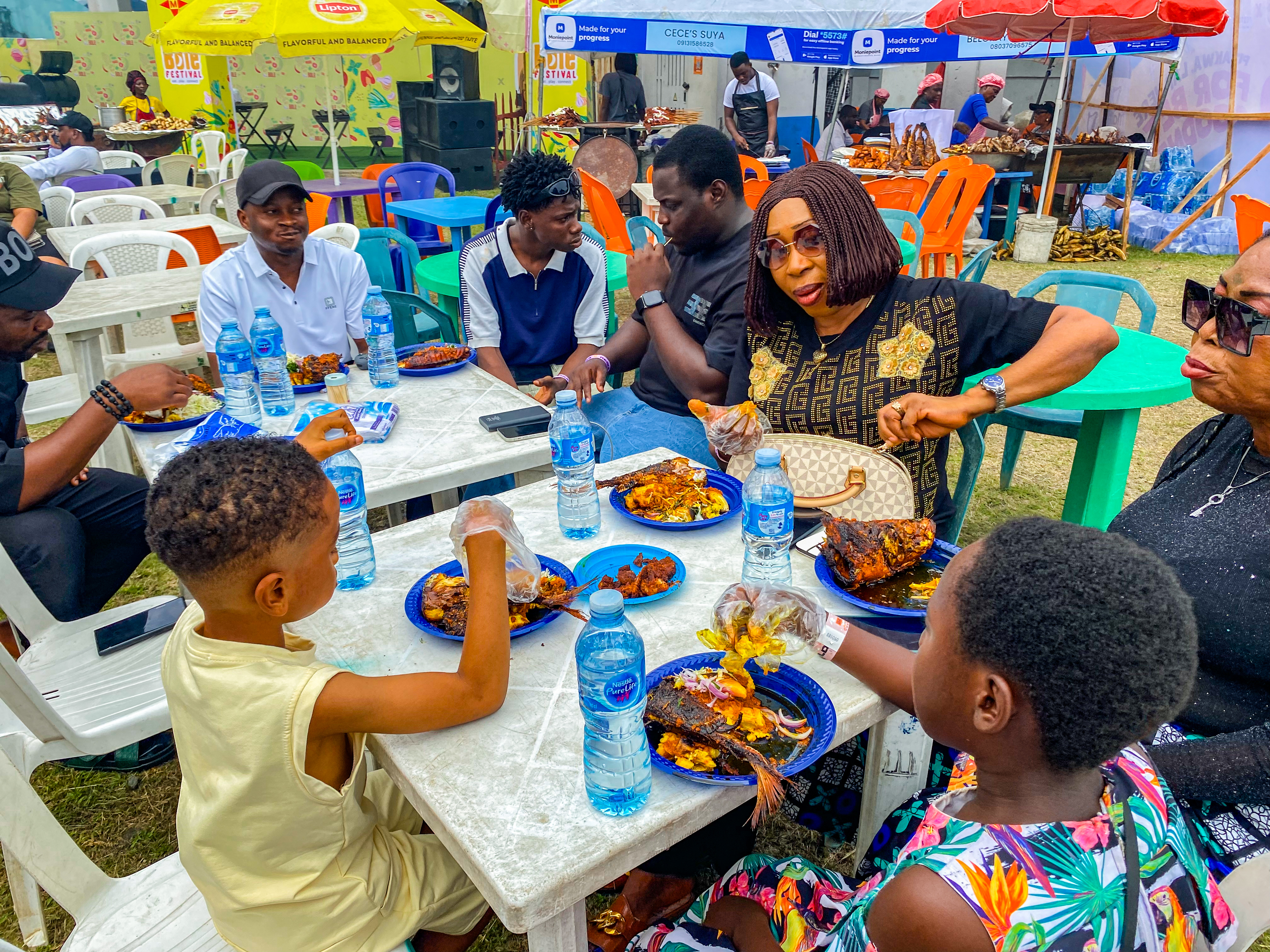

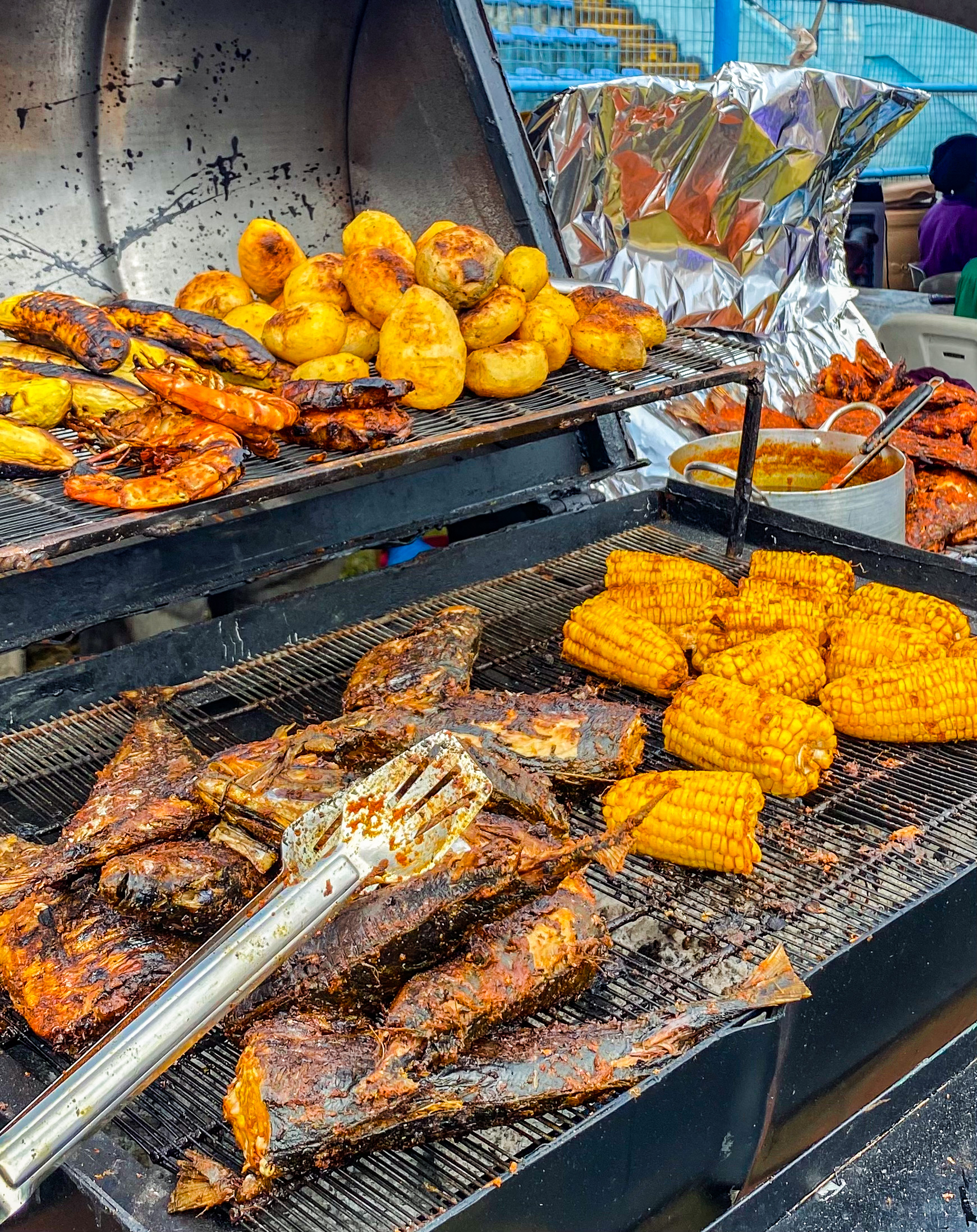

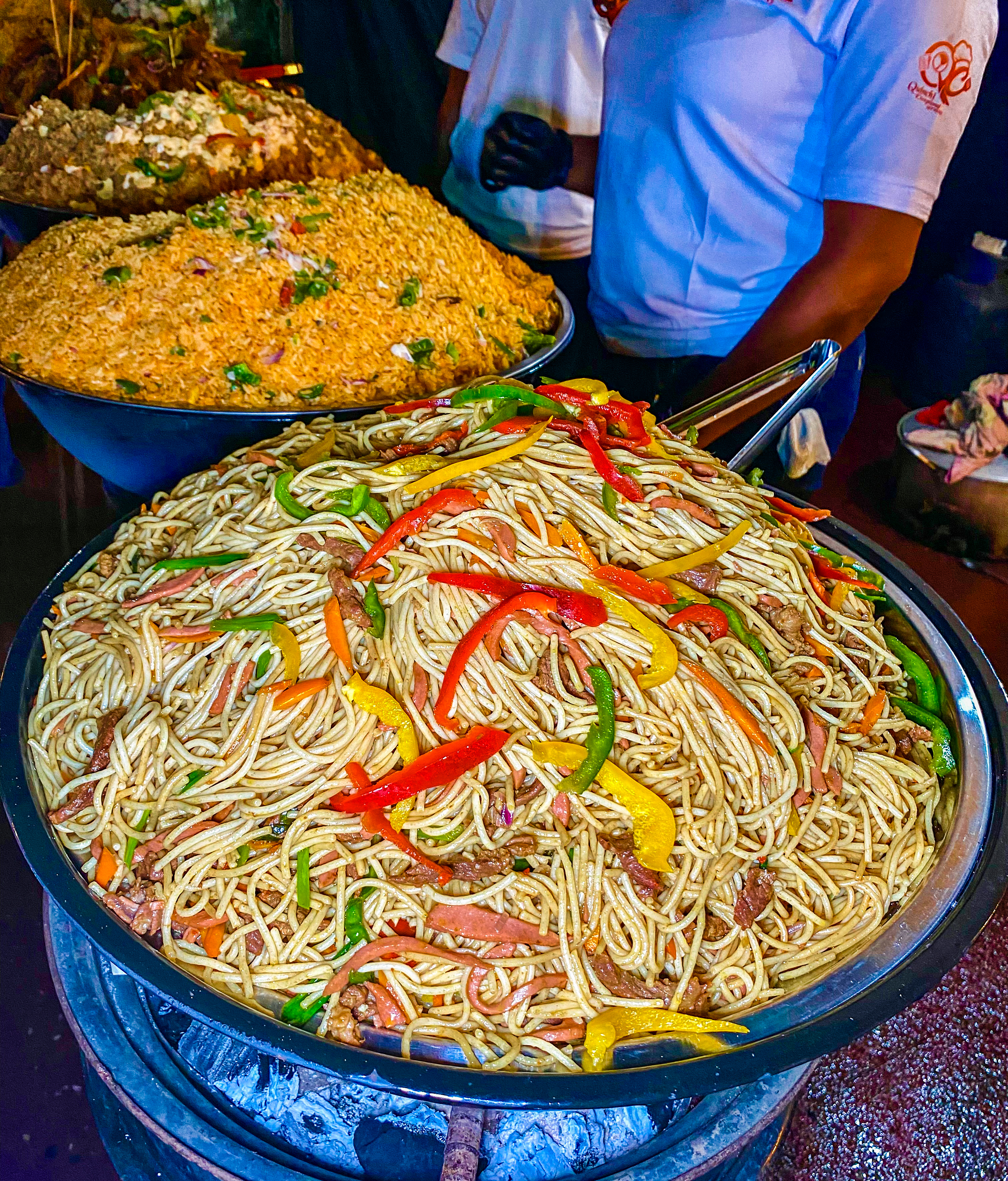

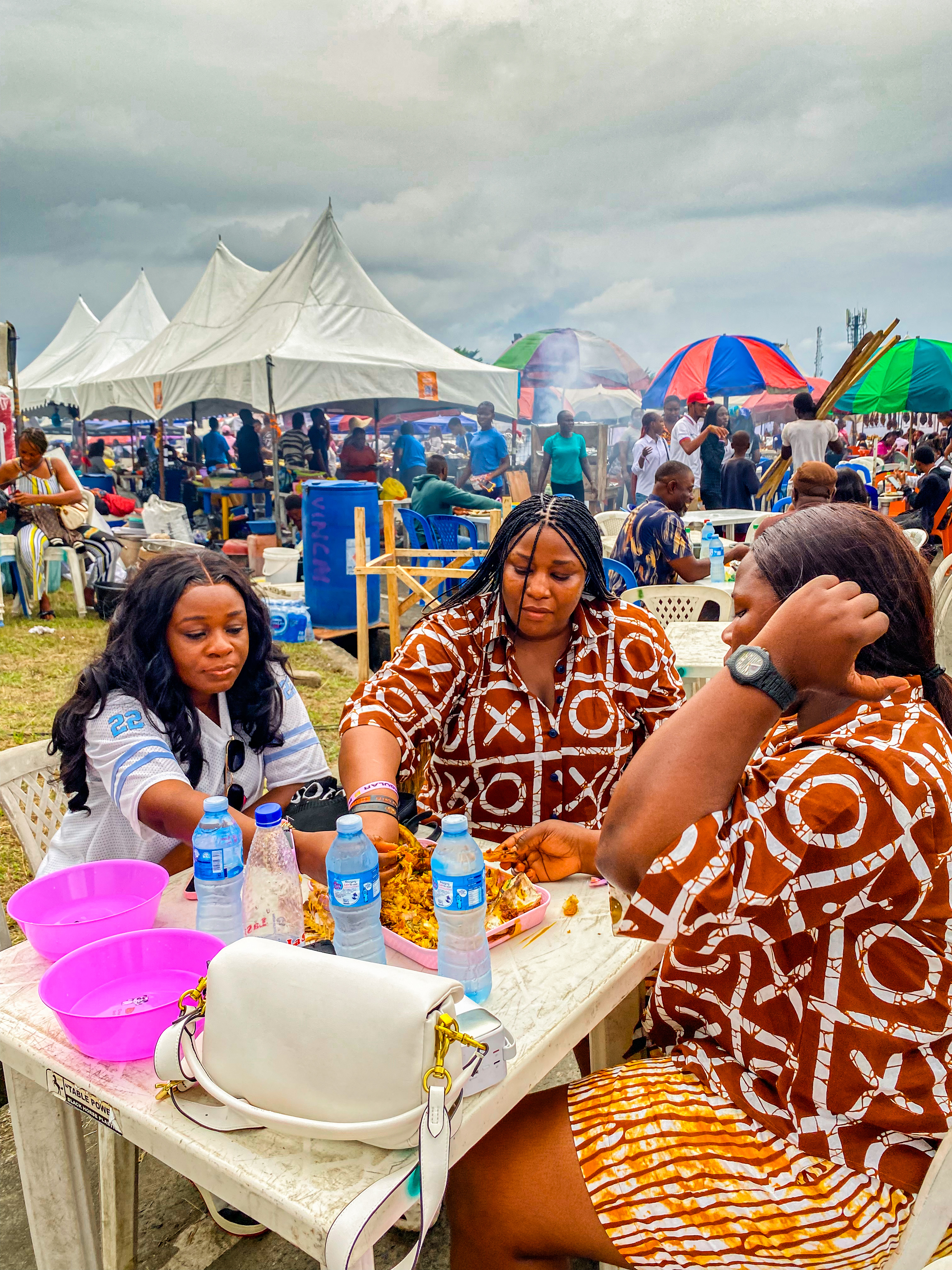

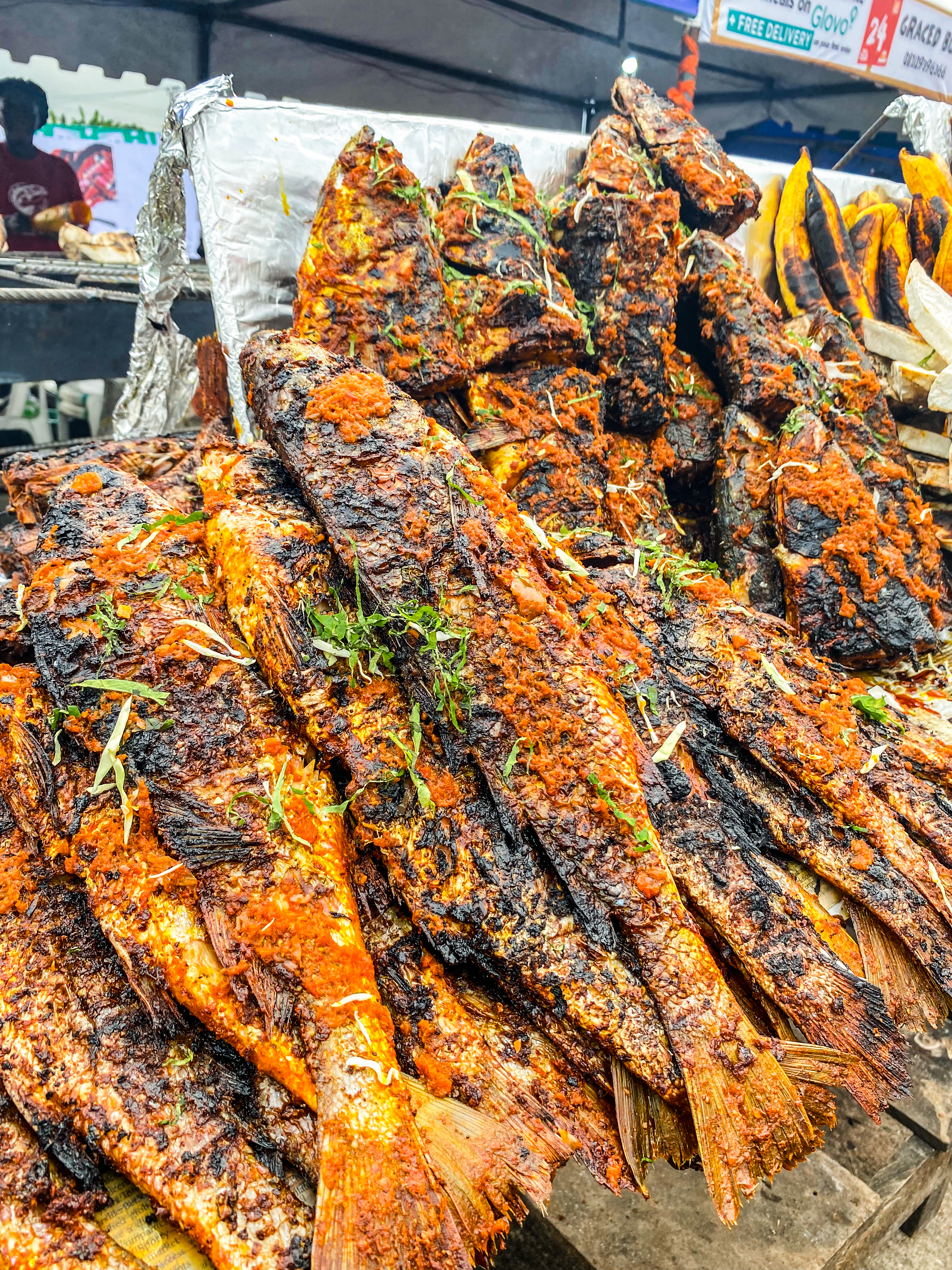

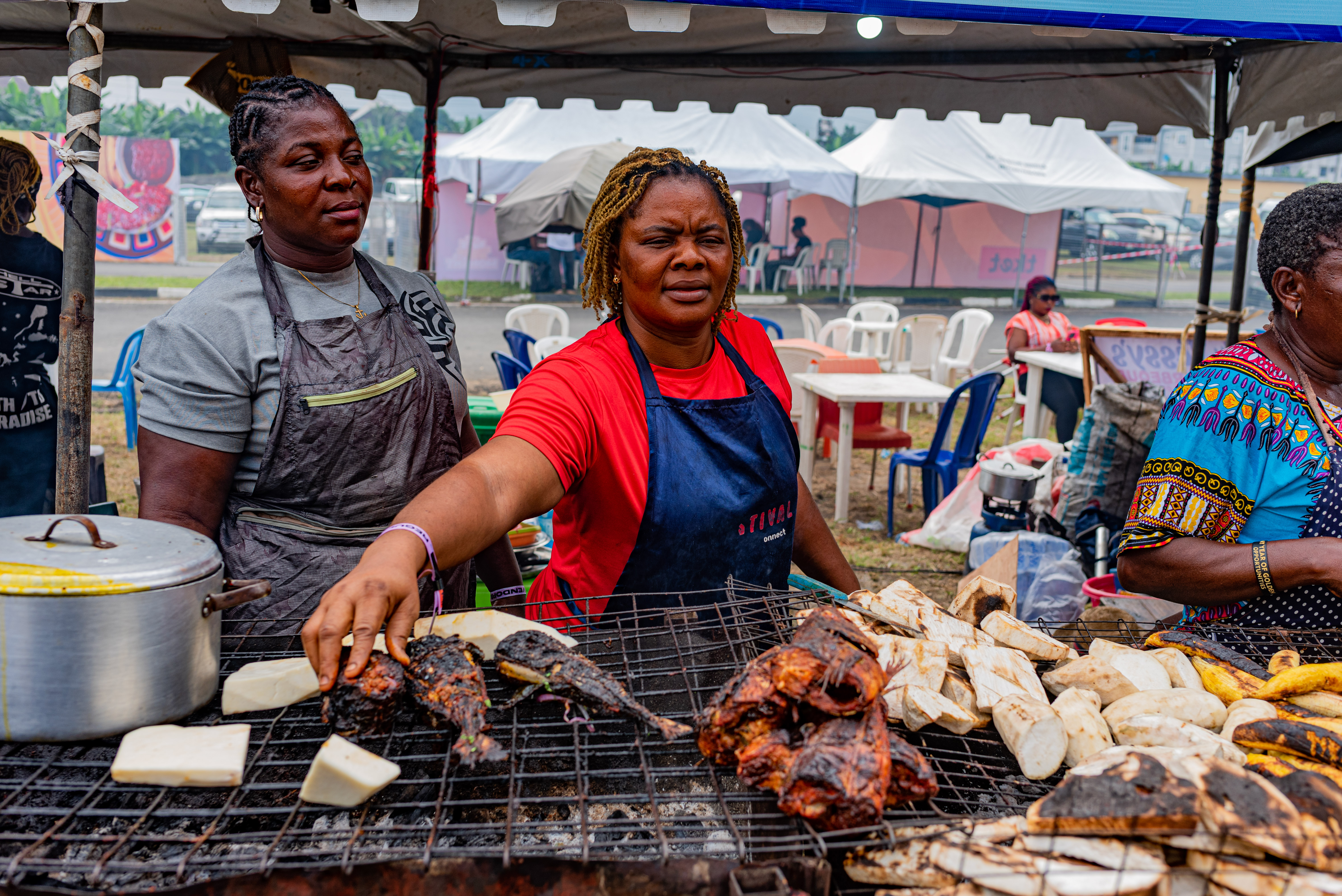

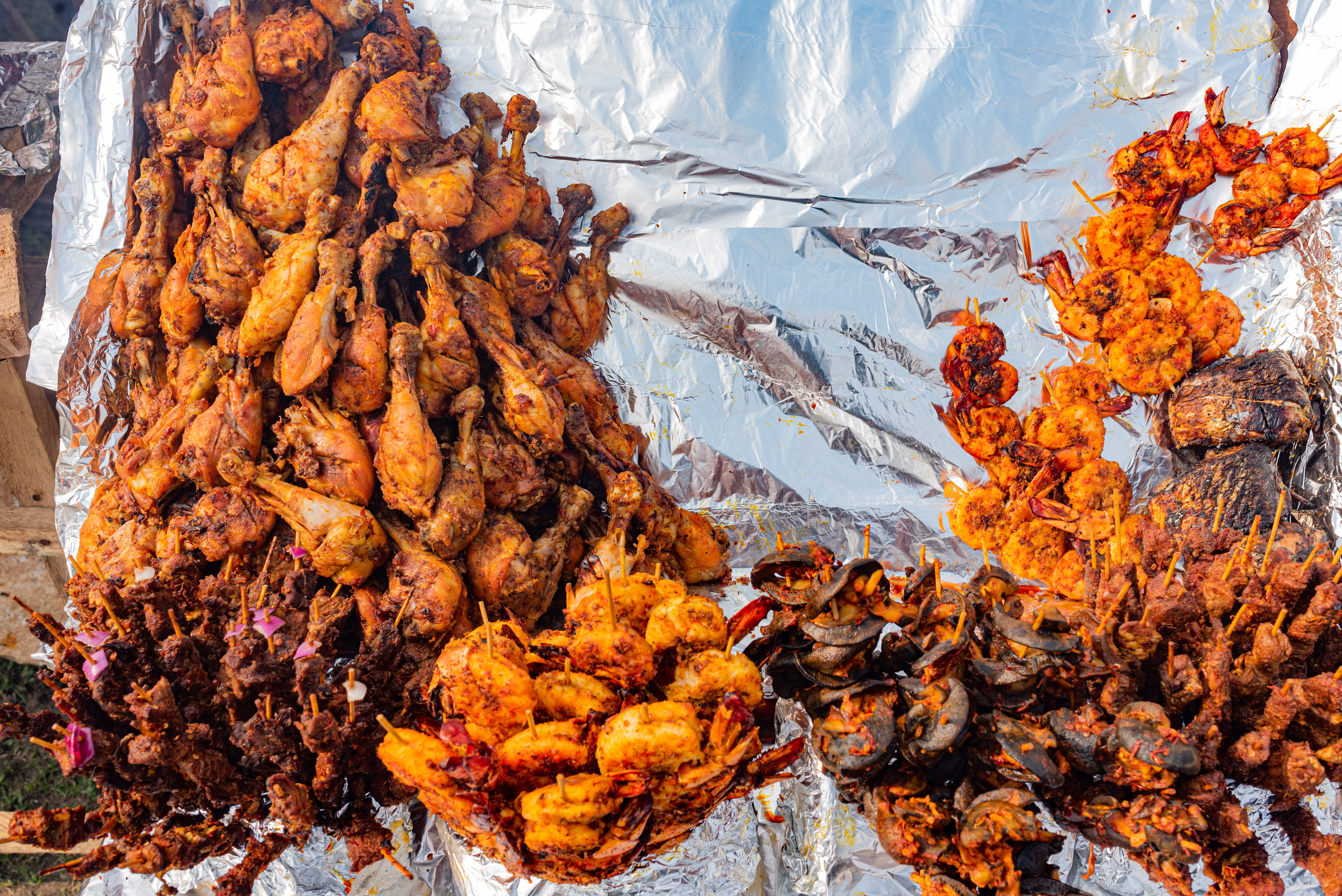

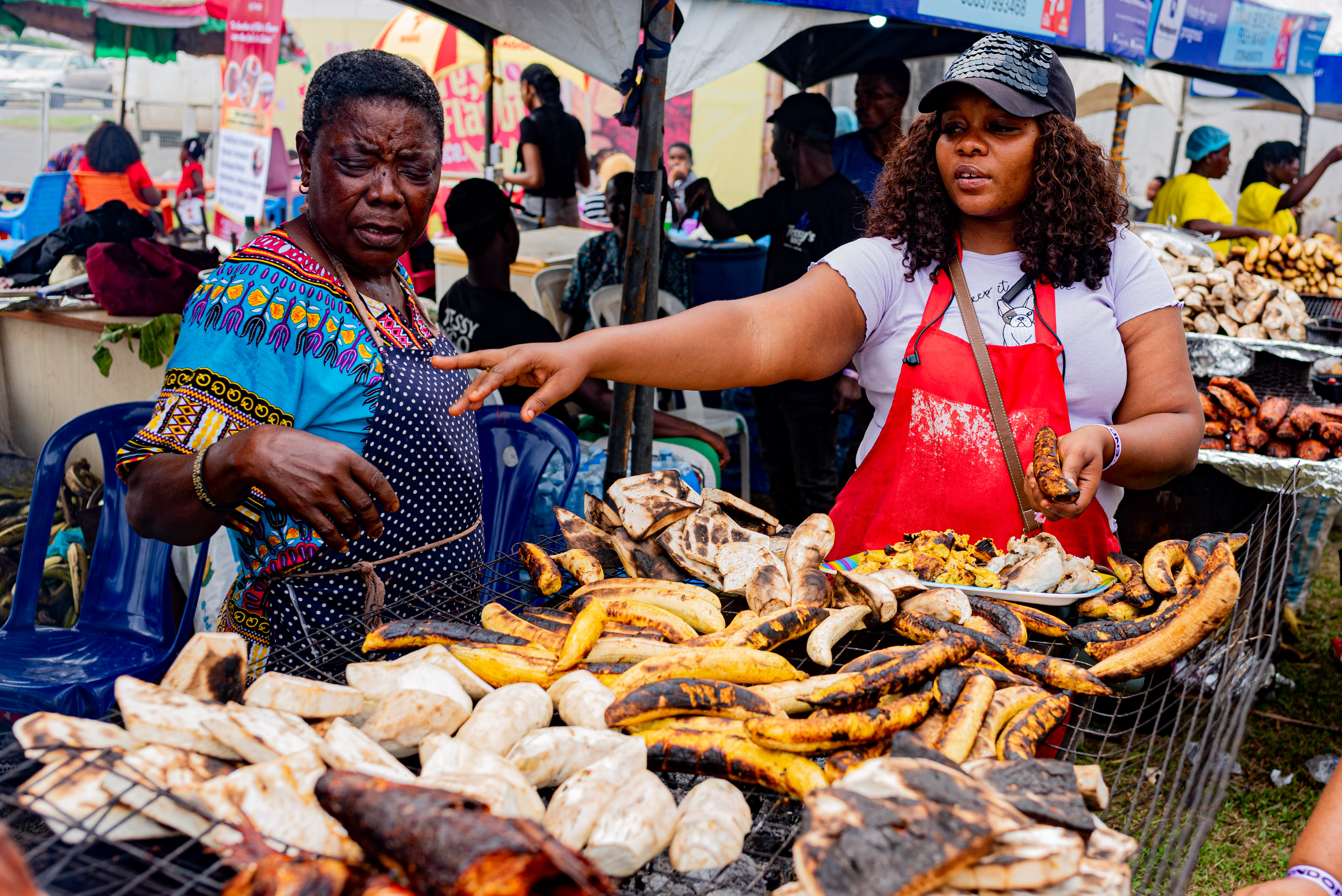

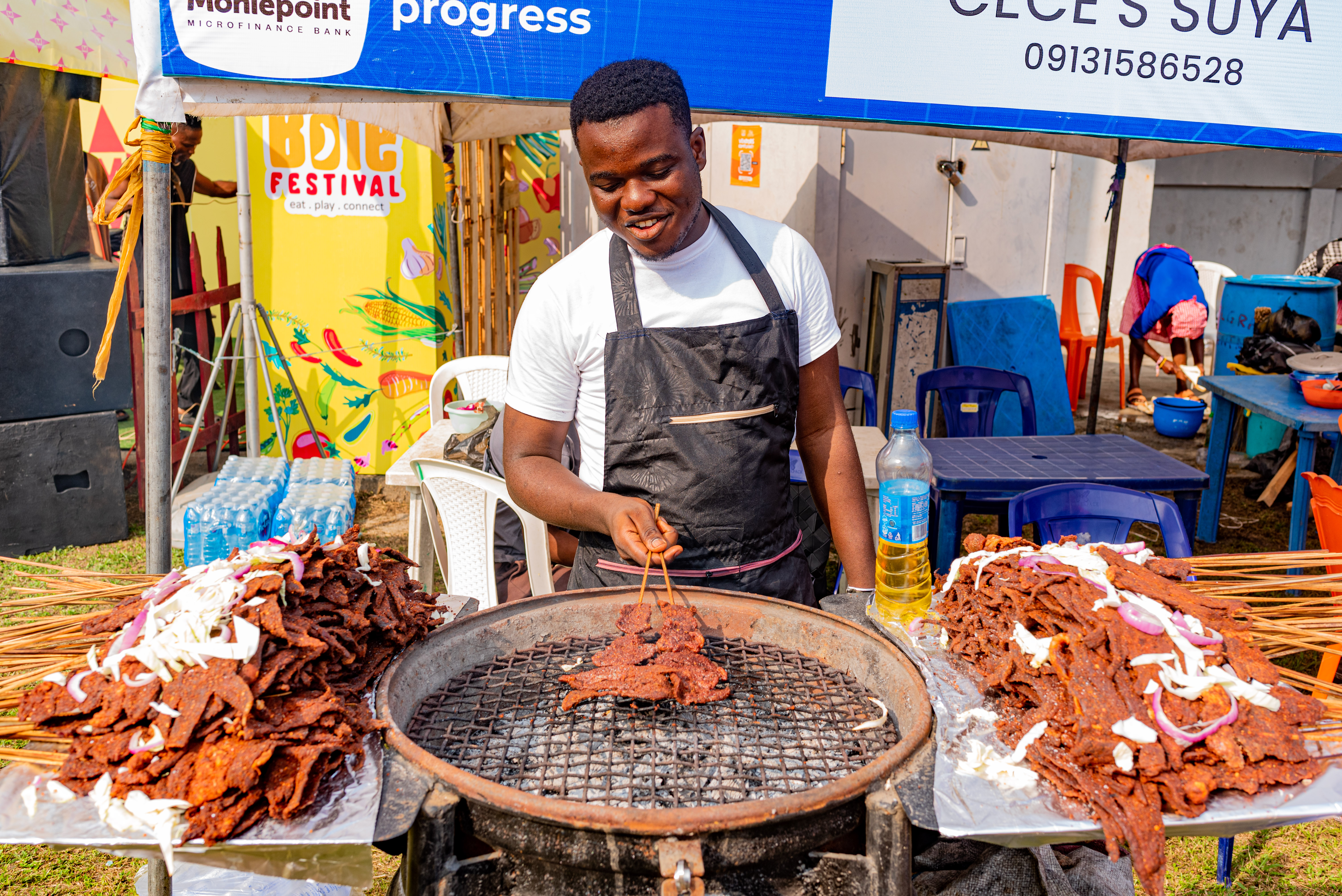

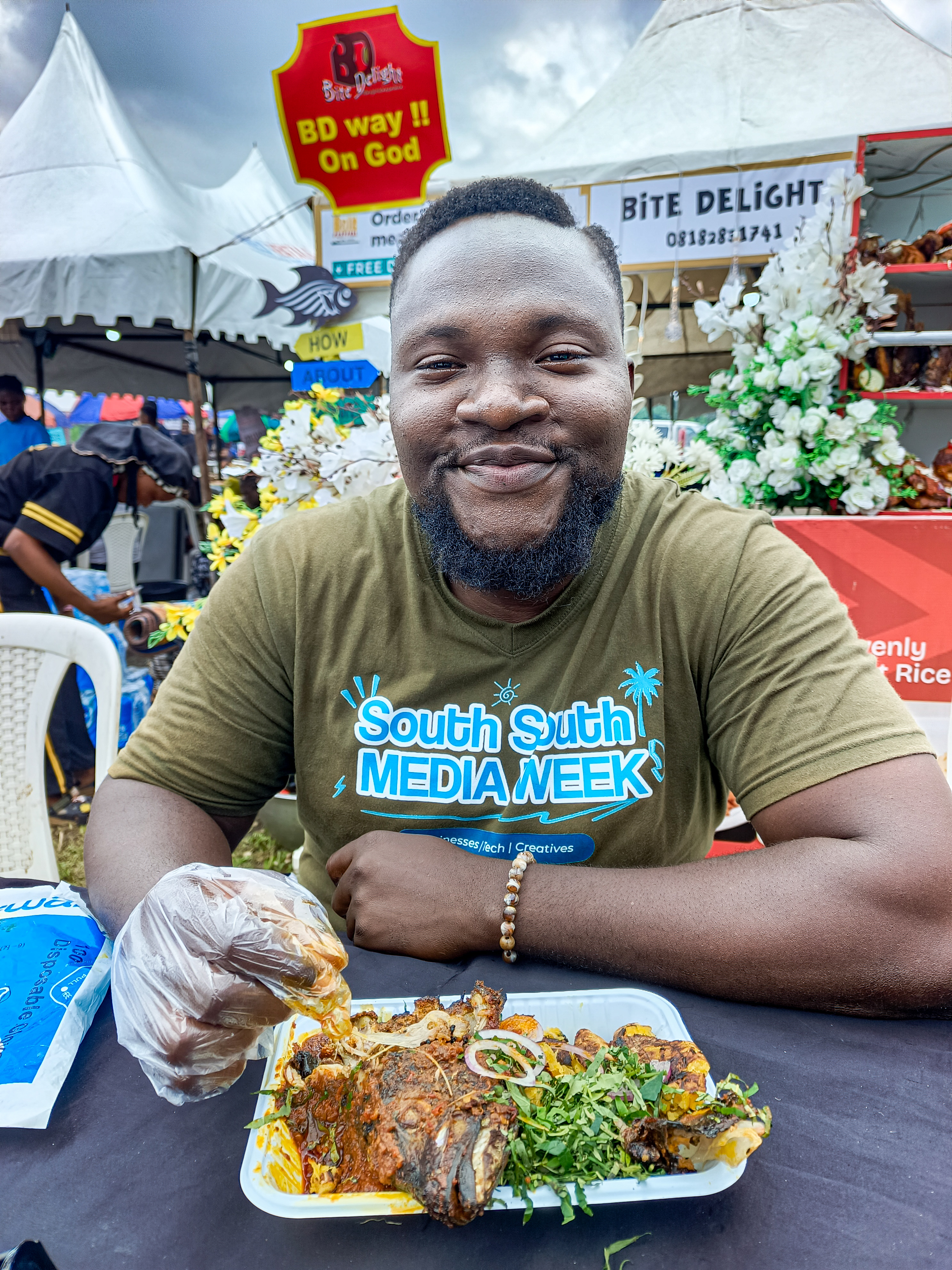

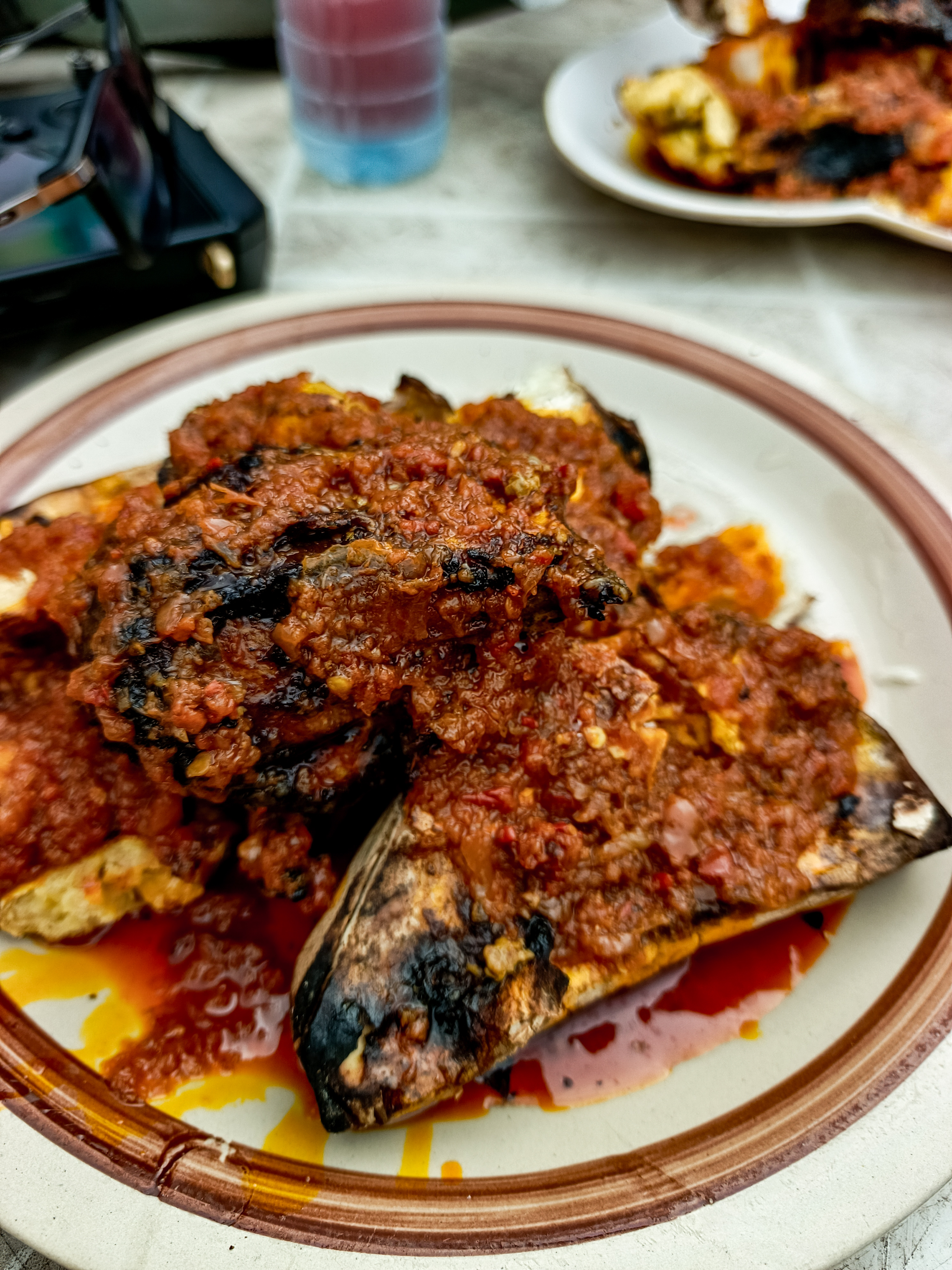

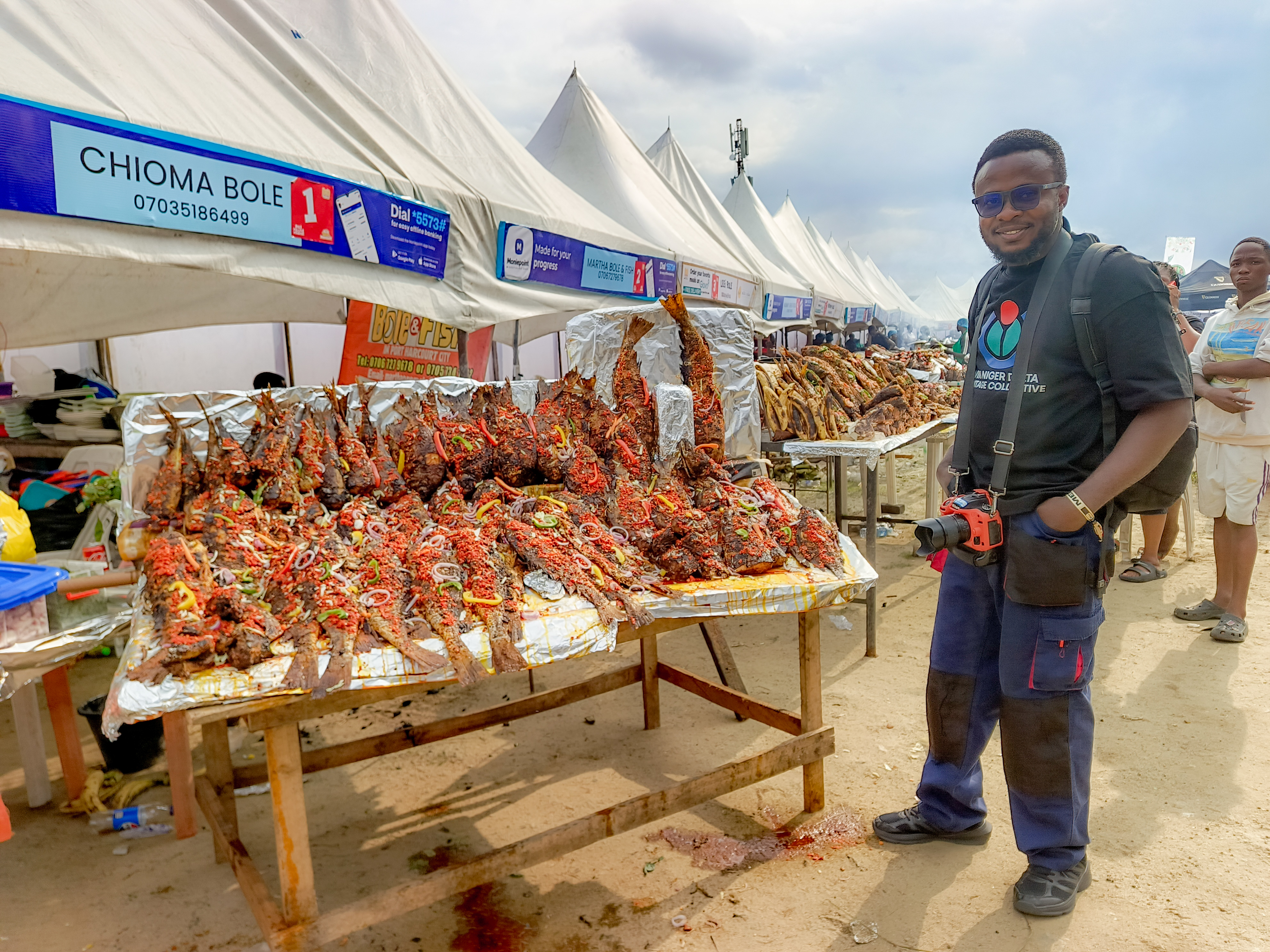

== See also ==
List of festivals in Nigeria
