= Gold Coast Greek Festival =

Cultural festival in Gold Coast, Australia

- Genre: Greek festival
- Location: Surfers Paradise, Queensland
- Inaugurated: ≈1990s
- Founder: George Mastrocostas
- Most recent: 31 October - 1 November 2026

The Gold Coast Greek Festival is a culture festival held at the Home of the Arts precinct in Surfers Paradise, Queensland, Australia.

== History ==
As was the case in many parts of Australia, the Gold Coast began welcoming Greek migrants to the city following the conclusion of World War II as national post-war immigration policies to incentivise entry into Australia were established with several European countries in an attempt to increase the Australian population for the purposes of defence. The local Greek community on the Gold Coast grew considerably in the decade that followed the conclusion of World War II and Greek Orthodox worship services began being held on the Gold Coast in 1958 when Very Reverend Father Gregory Sakellariou would travel from Brisbane to conduct the Divine Liturgy at local Anglican churches in Surfers Paradise and Southport.

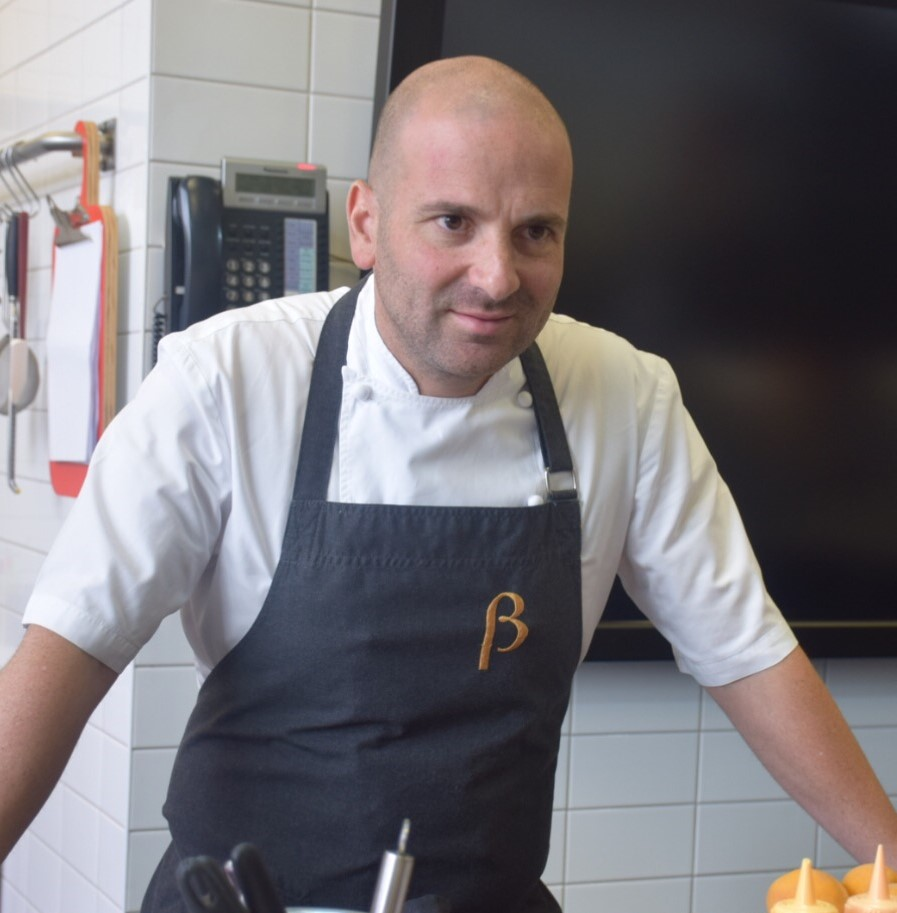
Prominent Greek-Australian chef George Calombaris headlined the 2026 Gold Coast Greek Festival with a live cooking demonstration and a six course dining experience that was followed by a Q&A.

The Greek Orthodox Community of St Anna (Gold Coast) was formally recognised by the State Government of Queensland in 1965 under the Religious, Charitable and Other Institutions Act and as a result local Greek-Australian benefactor Peter Vaggelas and his wife Stamatina (Betty) pledged land in Bundall for the establishment of a Greek Orthodox church once a canonically legal community was formed. Construction of a community centre intended to host church services began in 1976 and Father George Papoutsakis was appointed the first Parish Priest as the Parish-Community grew its reach from Beenleigh, through the Gold Coast and into the Northern Rivers of New South Wales. In 1978, local Greek-Australian community member Bert Voutos founded the Surfers Paradise Apollo Soccer Club after several failed attempts to convince the Gold Coast Greek Committee to buy/lease grounds to form a soccer club and it became another meeting place for the Gold Coast Greek community to congregate.

Several prominent Greek-Australian property developers moved to the Gold Coast in the 1970s and left a lasting impact on the city as well as the local Greek community. Greek-born Australian property developer Jim Raptis OBE moved to the Gold Coast in 1973 and launched his first Mykonos Apartments project in 1978 before dedicating the following forty years of his life to constructing iconic landmarks and buildings that substantially shaped the Gold Coast's distinctive skyline. In 1987, then-St Anna Community President Raptis and his wife Helen donated land adjoining the community centre in Bundall to build a permanent Greek Orthodox church capable of catering for the growing Greek community on the Gold Coast and the Church of St Anna was subsequently established in 1988 as the Gold Coast St Anna Community celebrated its 30th anniversary of existence.

Another Greek-born Australian property developer Bill Nikiforides moved to the Gold Coast in 1978 and was heavily involved with the Gold Coast St Anna Greek Orthodox Community before becoming the patriarch of a prominent multi-generational property development family that was honoured for their contributions by the City of Gold Coast in 2013 with the renaming of a Broadbeach park - Nikiforides Family Park. Athens-born property developer Con Makris also relocated to the Gold Coast and became a major financial backer of the St Anna Community as well as gaining local prominence as the owner of major developments such as Marina Mirage. British-Australian singer Peter Andre is a prominent example of a local entertainer of Greek origin who grew up on the Gold Coast in the 1980s before finding international fame in the 1990s. The Greek diaspora on the Gold Coast continued to grow in the 1990s and it led to calls for a Greek Festival to be held in the city, which would come to fruition in the late 1990s.

The first Gold Coast Greek Festival was held in the late 1990s as a major celebration of Greek culture, music, dancing, heritage and hospitality. In 2002, the fourth edition of the Gold Coast Greek Festival was held and it attracted an attendance of more than 30,000 people. In 2010, local Greek-Australian restaurateur Simon Gloftis opened his first Greek eatery named Hellenika in Nobby's Beach on the Gold Coast and it quickly became the most popular restaurant in the city before expanding into other major cities in Australia. In 2011, the 10th edition of the Gold Coast Greek Festival was held and it attracted a record attendance, which led to further expansion for the 2013 edition.

After a 13-year hiatus, Honorary Consul General of Greece in Queensland George Mastrocostas announced in conjuction with the City of Gold Coast that the Gold Coast Greek Festival would return in 2026 and would be held at the Home of the Arts precinct in Surfers Paradise. Months prior to the announcement, the City of Gold Coast signed a reaffirmed Sister City partnership with the Greek city of Ancient Olympia to strengthen ties with the Greek community in the lead up to the 2032 Summer Olympics. The 2026 edition of the Gold Coast Greek Festival included activities such as traditional dancing, a plate-smashing competition and a honey puff (loukoumades) eating competition as well as being headlined by live cooking demonstrations from notable Greek-Australian chefs such as George Calombaris, Anna Polyviou and Vikki Moursellas.

== See also ==
- Paniyiri Greek Festival (Brisbane)
- Let's Go Greek Festival (Sydney)
- Glendi Festival (Adelaide)
