= Portland Greek Festival =

Annual event in Portland, Oregon, U.S.

- The festival's logo
- Status: Active
- Genre: Festival
- Frequency: Annually
- Venue: Holy Trinity Greek Orthodox Cathedral
- Location: Portland, Oregon
- Country: United States
- Participants: ~15,000
- Website: portlandgreekfestival.com

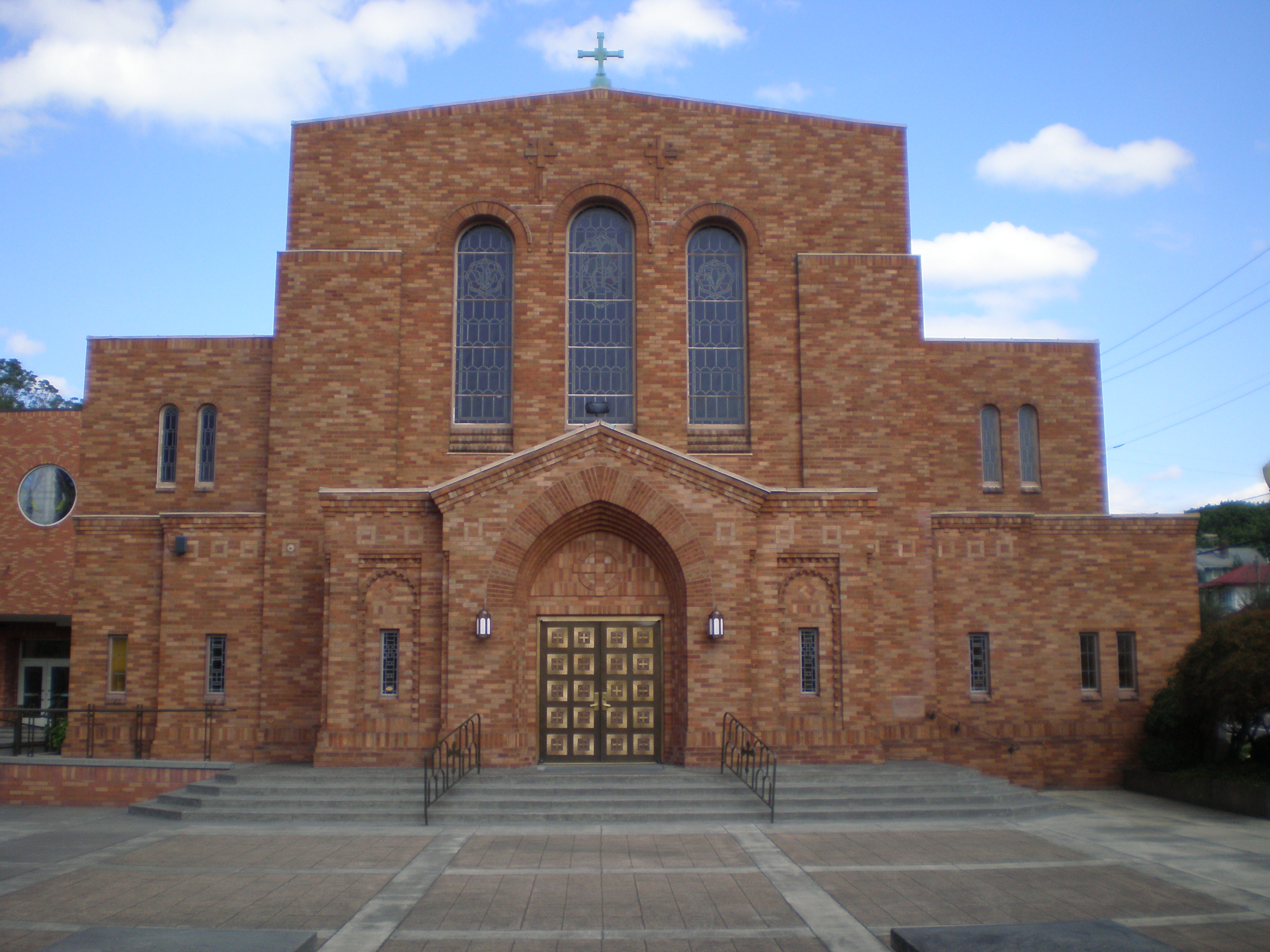
The festival is held at the Holy Trinity Greek Orthodox Cathedral (exterior pictured in 2011)

The Portland Greek Festival is an annual Greek festival in Portland, Oregon, United States. The event is held at the Holy Trinity Greek Orthodox Cathedral, in the northeast Portland part of the Kerns neighborhood, in October. The event has attracted approximately 15,000 people annually and has been designated an Oregon Heritage Tradition.

== Description ==
The festival features dancing, music, food such as gyros and souvlaki, and other vendors. There is also a children's area with face painting and games.

== History ==
The event was established in 1951 by women seeking to raise funds to build a new church. It was paused during the COVID-19 pandemic, returning in 2022.

== See also ==
- Culture of Portland, Oregon
