= Vegfest (AU) =

Annual vegan festival in Australia

43rd World VegFest in Australia
- Genre: veganism
- Location: Australia
- Years active: 2015
- Founders: International Vegetarian Union
- Website: 43rd World VegFest in Australia

VegfestAU is a vegan food festival held annually in Sydney and Melbourne on or around World Vegan Day, 1 November.

== Sydney ==
During the 2010s, Sydney ran an annual Cruelty Free Festival each 25 October.

== Melbourne ==
The IVU encourages regional and national organizations to run vegetarian festivals. The 43rd World Vegfest was held in Sydney and Melbourne in October 2015.

On 1 November each year, annual World Vegan Day celebrations will be conducted in Melbourne.

== Other vegan festivals in Oceania ==
Other annual vegan festivals are scheduled in Oceania.

=== Australia ===
==== Adelaide ====
- Adelaide celebrates World Vegan Day every year on a Sunday in November. The first Vegan Festival was held on 4 November 2007. The event is possible because of many individual volunteers and members of various organizations. Kas Ward created the Vegan Festival in Adelaide and is the main event coordinator.
- M.A.D. FREE Weekend in Adelaide celebrates World Vegan Day in November. 13–15 November 2009.

==== Melbourne ====
- Since 2003, World Vegan Day has been celebrated in Melbourne on the last Sunday of October. The event was initiated by members of the vegan social group Vegans Unite and is now organized by a committee affiliated with Vegetarian Victoria. Stalls include Lentil as Anything, Invita Living Foods, Animals Australia, Aduki Independent Press, Eco-shout Melbourne, Vegan Society of Australia, ALV, the Melbourne University Food Co-op, Lush Australia and eco store.

==== Perth ====
- Perth organises a market and entertainment on the first weekend of November.

==== Sydney ====
- The Winery by Gazebo in Surry Hills held Sydney's first annual event on the first Sunday of November, being Sunday 6th in 2016.

=== New Zealand ===
==== Dunedin ====
- The Dunedin Ōtepoti Vegan Society (DŌVeS) runs events each year.

==== Invercargill ====
- Invercargill Vegan Society in Invercargill, New Zealand, has celebrated World Vegan Day since 2011. The world's southernmost vegan group, for World Vegan Day 2012 they gave away tofu to butchers, placed posters around their city, gave away vegan muffins in the city centre and held a group potluck dinner. World Vegan Day 2013 celebrations included visits to butchers' shops and vegan baking and soya milk giveaways in the city centre. Vegan activists were included on the CUE TV's news bulletin and gave a soft toy dog to an animal-skin-preserving factory. A potluck dinner was held at Invercargill public library as the sun set on World Vegan Day 2013. Events continued in 2016.

== See also ==
- International Vegetarian Union
- List of vegetarian festivals
- Vegfest
- World Vegan Day
