= Puerto Vallarta International Gourmet Festival =

Culinary festival in Puerto Vallarta, Mexico

- Status: Active
- Frequency: Annually
- Country: Mexico

Puerto Vallarta International Gourmet Festival (The Festival Gourmet International Vallarta) is an annual culinary festival held in Puerto Vallarta, Mexico, every November since 1995. There were 35,000 visitors to the festival in 2006.

Every year the Festival invites culinary professionals from all over the world to cook and to demonstrate their cuisines. The Festival is supported by local restaurants. During the Festival, international and local food and beverage professionals run events around town, with each of the participating restaurants hosting a guest master chef and creating its own events to complement its food offerings.

Events during the festival include the Sunday Festival Gourmet Brunch, Wine Tasting, and Cheeses of the World. There are also Chef's Table and Winemakers' dinners hosted by restaurants. The traditional Gala Dinner, called The Spirit of Mexico, concludes the Festival.

== History ==
The festival was the idea of Thierry Blouet of Café des Artistes, Heinz Reize of Hotel Krystal and Sivan Muller of Nestle . They launched the first Puerto Vallarta Festival in 1995 (November 18–26). Six five-star hotels, six restaurants and twelve invited chefs participated in that festival . During the last eleven years of the festival, about two hundred featured chefs have participated in the event.

In 2003, the honored guest of the festival was Anton Mosimann, who received an appointment by Queen Elizabeth II as an "Officer of the Order of the British Empire" and is a twice winner of the gold medal at the world level and the proprietor of Club Mossimann in both London and Switzerland. Gerard Dupont, a president of Academie Culinaire de France, comes every year to teach classes and share his secrets with both colleagues and the public.

== See also ==
- Castroville Artichoke Festival
- Food festival
