= Greek Food Festival (Tallahassee) =

Coordinates: 30.4588°N 84.2400°W

The Greek Food Festival is a festival held in mid-to-late October in Tallahassee, Florida, United States and hosted by the Holy Mother of God Greek Orthodox Church.

== Goal ==
As in many Greek festivals in the U.S., this festival is part of Tallahassee's diversity of cultures. The goal is to give the community a taste of Greek food, Greek music, Greek culture, Greek dancing, and entertainment. At Greek Festivals you will typically find Greek gourmet food, Greek folk music — usually performed by Greek bands, cultural exhibitions including artifacts from Greece and dances performed in costumes of old tradition, and dancing for the public under Greek tunes. It is a community-building event for the parish.

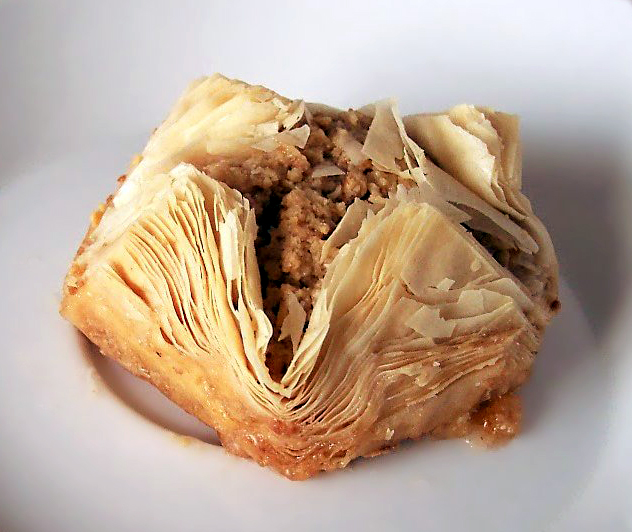
A piece of baklava

== Foods ==
Traditional Greek foods like spanakopita, tzatziki, baklava, dolmades, tsoureki, skordalia, melitzanosalata, melomakarona, kakavia soup, kourabiedes, kothropita, and kapamas are made.

== See also ==
- Greek Food Festival of Dallas
