= Lagos Seafood Festival =

Yearly seafood festival

Lagos Seafood festival
- Language: English

Origin
- Meaning: Local Wrestling
- Region of origin: Nigeria

The Lagos Seafood Festival is an annual event in Lagos. It was first held on 10 November 2012 at the Eko Hotel and Suites. The festival is aimed at promoting seafood cuisine culture, local fish production and stimulating investment opportunities in relation to aquaculture and fisheries.

This festival went on hiatus in 2020.
