= Bankstown Bites Food Festival =

Food festival in Sydney, New South Wales, Australia

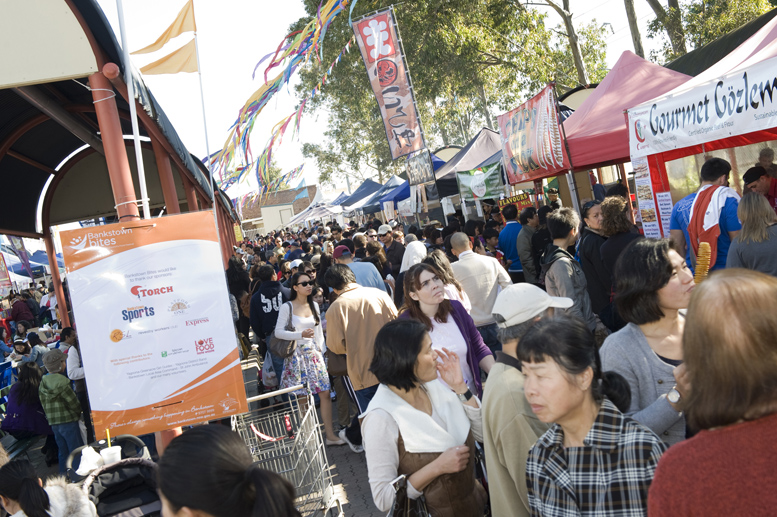
- Bankstown Bites Food Festival
- Inaugurated: 2005

Bankstown Bites Food Festival is a food festival that takes place in the suburb of Bankstown in Sydney, New South Wales, Australia.

== Festival ==
Started in 2005 by the Bankstown City Council, the event is held annually in July and includes cooking demonstrations, live performances, tours of local food outlets, activities for the kids and food stalls. An estimated 10,000 people attend each year.

Local and celebrity chefs conduct cooking demonstrations. Chefs such as Miguel Maestre, Darren Simpson, Ed Halmagyi and Iain Hewitson have all been a part of the event. Local chefs including Antonios Chayna, from Platform 1, and Robert Green, Bel Cibo, have also been a part of Bites to promote local cuisine. Both local and celebrity chefs contribute to the annual Bankstown Bites Food Festival Recipe Book.

Discovery Food Tours take place during the festival, which are themed tours. Themes include Asian Explorer, European Delights, Aboriginal bush tucker food and Treats from the Middle East. The range of food at the festival includes Lebanese pizza, Indian sweets, African staples, Vietnamese pho, Balkan sausages, Greek cakes, Filipino groceries, Chinese teas and halal butchers.

The festival also has activities like cooking classes, sustainability displays and food craft, rides and puppet shows for kids. The festival also featured art exhibitions, a poetry slam performance and fruit hat and sculpture making. The Bankstown Talent Advancement Program has local performers at the festival.

There was no festival in 2020 and 2021 due to COVID-19 pandemic in Australia.

== Celebrity chefs ==
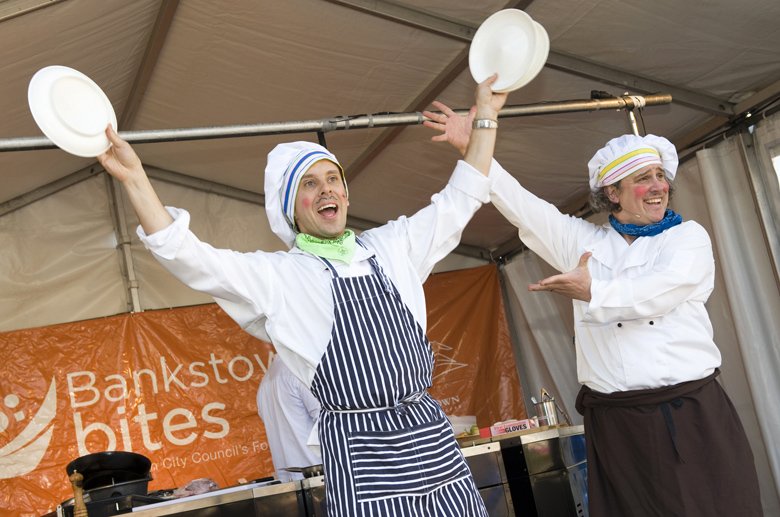
Bankstown Bites Comedy Chef

- 2006 – Vince Sorrenti
- 2007 – Iain Hewitson
- 2008 – Fast Ed (Ed Halmagyi)
- 2009 – Fast Ed (Ed Halmagyi)
- 2010 – Miguel Maestre
- 2011 – Darren Simpson
- 2012 – Justine Schofield
- 2013 – Marion Grasby
- 2014 - Fast Ed (Ed Halmagyi)
- 2015 - Adam Liaw
- 2016 - Ben O'Donoghue
- 2017 - Darren Robertson
- 2018 - Colin Fassnidge
- 2019 - Matt Sinclair
- 2020 – NONE
- 2021 – NONE
- 2022 – Adrian Richardson and Alvin Quah
- 2023 – Diana Chan and Arrnott Olssen
- 2024 – Anna Polyviou
