= Let's Go Greek Festival =

Annual Greek cultural festival in Sydney

- Status: Active
- Genre: Greek cultural festival
- Frequency: Annually
- Locations: George St, Parramatta, Sydney, NSW
- Coordinates: 33.8172°S 151.0141°E
- Years active: 2014-present
- Inaugurated: 2014
- Previous event: September 21 2025
- Next event: 2026
- Attendance: 70,000 (2025)
- Major events: Greek food, culture, music, traditional dancing, cultural exhibitions, market stalls, carnival rides, and fireworks.
- Organiser: Greek Orthodox Parish and Community of St Ioannis (St John)
- Sponsors: NSW Government, City of Parramatta Council, Aussie Industries, Divine Family Funerals
- Website: https://letsgogreekfestival.com.au/

The Let's Go Greek Festival is an annual greek festival that takes place in Parramatta, a suburb in Sydney, NSW, since its establishment in 2014. The festival attracted 70,000 people in 2025.

== History ==
The festival started in 2014 and has taken place annually, with exception to 2020 and 2021 due to the COVID-19 Pandemic.

The festival has grown in the number of attendees over time, drawing 20,000 attendees in 2019, 30,000 in 2023, 40,000 in 2022 and 2024, and reaching almost 70,000 attendees in 2025. In 2020, the festival was held online. The festival receives national media coverage, with SBS Radio providing live outside broadcasts from the festival.

Since 2014, numerous high-profile individuals and politicians have attended the festival. These include Archbishop Makarios of Australia, premier of NSW Chris Minns, politicians such as Geoff Lee, Donna Davis, Julie Owens, David Coleman, Steve Kamper and Andrew Charlton, Lord Mayor Martin Zaiter, Deputy Lord Mayor of Parramatta Sameer Pandey, the Consul General for Greece in Sydney Christos Karras, and Deputy High Commissioner of Cyprus Nikolaos Varellas.

== Funding ==
In 2019, the festival received AUD $200,000 in support from the NSW Government. The festival received a further AUD $10,000 cultural grant from Parramatta Council. Further funding is received through the sale of raffle tickets on and before the festival. In 2023, the Liberal Party of Australia pledged financial support to the festival for AUD $200,000 over four years, or AUD $50,000 annually, however they did not win the 2023 NSW State election so the funding did not occur.

== Festival ==
The festival takes place on the banks of the Parramatta River on George Street, and is organised by the local Greek Orthodox Parish of St. Ioannis and Community of St John. The festival has more than 80 food and market stalls, and Traditional Greek dancing is performed throughout the day. Fireworks occur at the end of the night. Further, cultural elements are often incorporated into the festival, such as Greek produce, merchandise, and exhibitions, such as the live creation of a textile from an authentic loom. Exhibitions relating to Greek Culture have been displayed over the years, such as the Evzones Collection by Nick Bourdaniotis to celebrate 200 years of Greece's Emancipation from the Ottoman Empire in 1821. The festival includes activities for children, such as donkey rides, a petting zoo, craft activities and carnival rides.

The festival also features live greek music, from Greek-Australian and Greek artists. In 2024, Konstantinos Pantelidis performed (the brother of Pantelis Pantelidis), and in 2025, Greek singer Giannis Ploutarhos performed in preparation for his national tour.

In 2025, a 500-kilogram gyros was prepared, the largest in the Southern Hemisphere.

In 2026, Greek singer Giorgos Tsalikis headlined the festival.

== See also ==
- List of festivals in Australia
