= Howell Melon Festival =

- Status: annual
- Genre: festivals
- Frequency: Annually
- Location: Howell, Michigan
- Country: United States
- Years active: 64–65
- Inaugurated: 1961
- Founder: Dr. Louis May
- Website: www.howellmelonfestival.com

The Howell Melon Festival is a food festival held in mid-August which showcases the Howell melon, a cantaloupe hybrid claimed to be found only in the area surrounding Howell, Michigan. The first Howell Melon Festival was held in 1961. About 50,000 people attend the three day festival each year.

In years past, the highlight of the festival was a beauty contest to elect the Howell Melon Queen. The very first Melon Queen, a nurse, won a trip to Washington, D.C. where she met with President Dwight D. Eisenhower at the White House. The news wires picked up the story of the beauty queen and the Howell melons, earning front-page stories in the Chicago Tribune and the Los Angeles Times, and "that's how the Howell melon got famous", according to Dr. Louis May, organizer of the first festival.

The festival is now managed by the Howell Area Parks and Recreation Authority. Instead of a Melon Queen, the new tradition is to elect children as Melon Prince and Princess, Mini Prince and Princess, and (the youngest category) Sprout Prince and Princess .

In the past, the festival included an ice cream eating contest and a large parade. The parade tradition which included the Shriners, was discontinued in 2008. The 50th anniversary was celebrated without a parade. For a few years, the festival organized a riverboat tour of Thompson lake. The 2012 venue will close Grand River Ave for two days to accommodate Mitch Ryder and the Detroit Wheels performance. Howell melons are available for tasting and purchase, with up to 200,000 melons sold each year.

While the following is a wonderful story, it is a myth. 'The first Howell melons were grown by August "Gus" Schmitt, a local farmer, who was given the original seeds by an itinerant hobo during the Great Depression. The taste of the melon soon won over other farmers who soon planted the distinctive melon elsewhere in Livingston County. The real story is contained in an article from 1964.

Many events were being held online in 2020 because of the COVID-19 pandemic.
