= Fofie Yam Festival =

Festival in Ghana by the people of Nchiraa

The Fofie Yam festival is celebrated by the chiefs and peoples of Nchiraa near Wenchi in the Brong Ahafo Region of Ghana. The festival is celebrated in the month of October every year.
