= Castroville Artichoke Festival =

Food festival in Monterey County, California (1959–2025)

Coordinates: 36°35′40.49″N 121°51′44.66″W

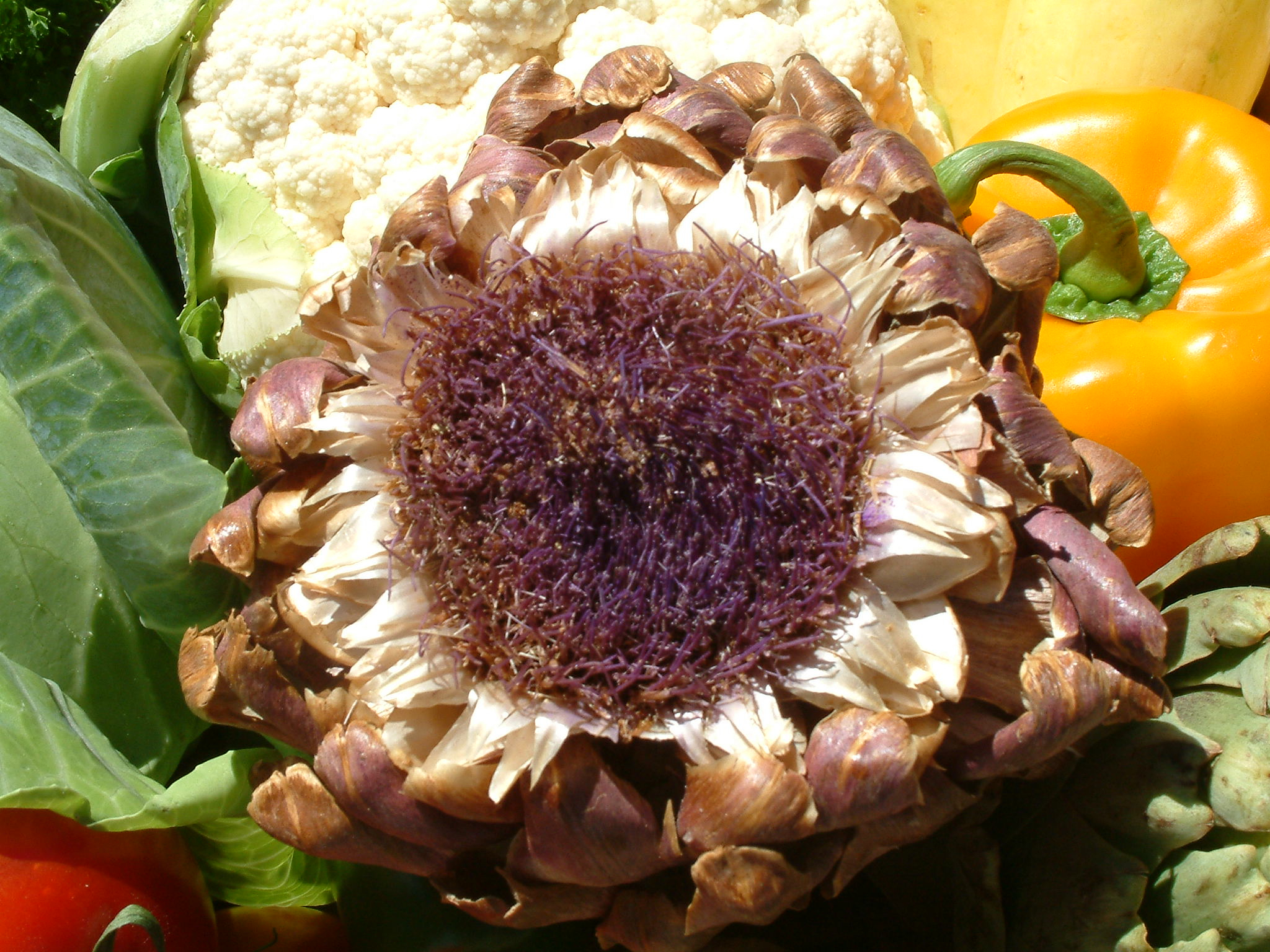
Artichoke Flower

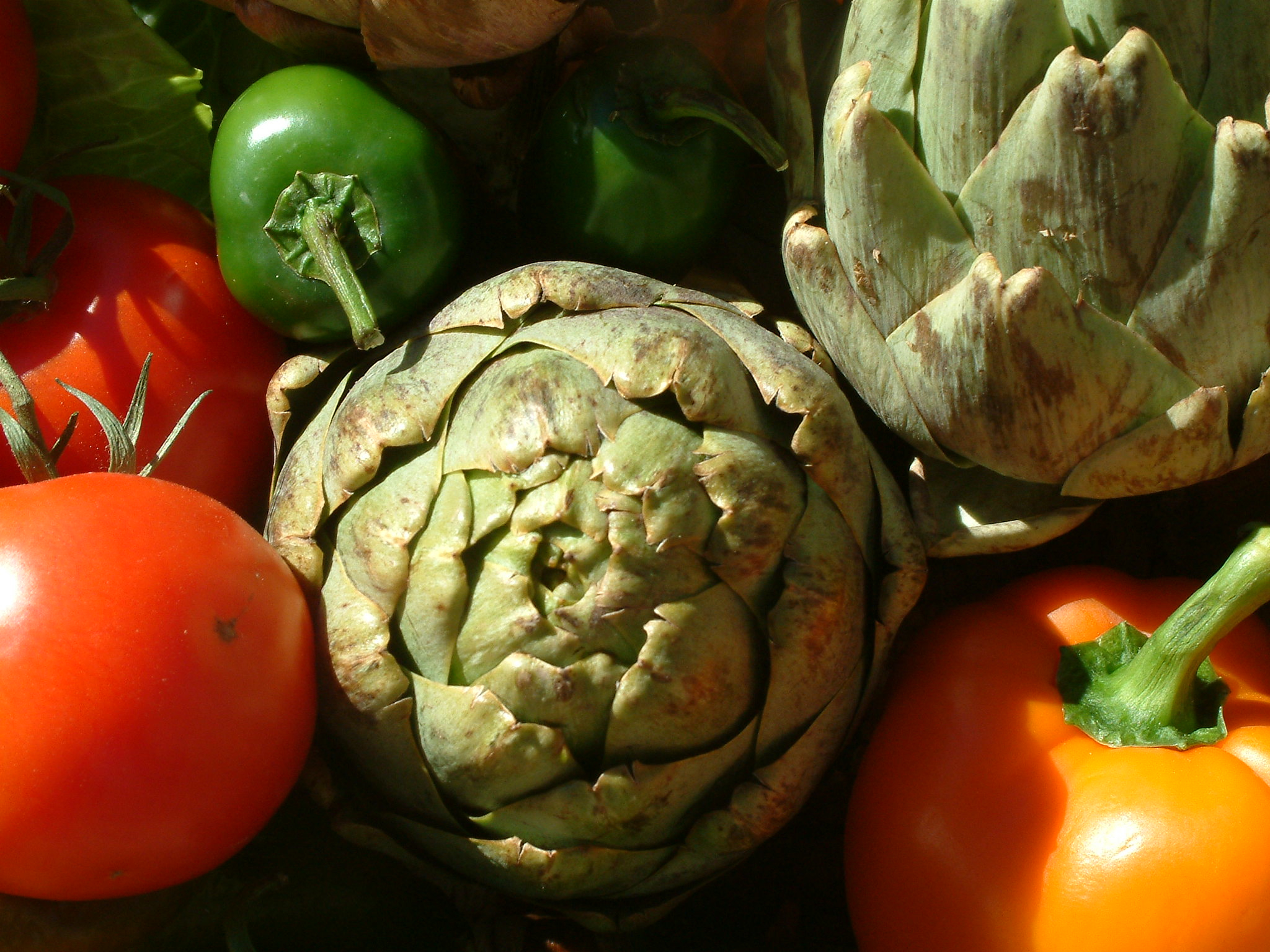
Artichoke & Vegetables

The Artichoke Festival (formally known as the Castroville Artichoke Festival) was a food festival held annually from 1959 until 2025 in Monterey, a town in Monterey County of the U.S. State of California. The city of Castroville, which calls itself the "Artichoke Center of the World", began promoting the artichoke with a festival in 1960, and the festival grew so large that it was moved out of the town, into a nearby convention center. Artichoke Festival 2009 marked the 50th anniversary of this celebration.

== History ==
=== Castroville artichokes ===
Artichokes were brought to California by Italian immigrants in the late 19th century, and to Castroville in the 1920s when Andrew Molera planted an acre of artichokes on his ranch. In 1922, Angelo del Chiaro and his cousin leased 150 acres from Molera and expanded the artichoke crop. By 1926, 12,000 acres in California, most of them in Castroville, were dedicated to growing artichokes.

=== The beginning of the fair ===
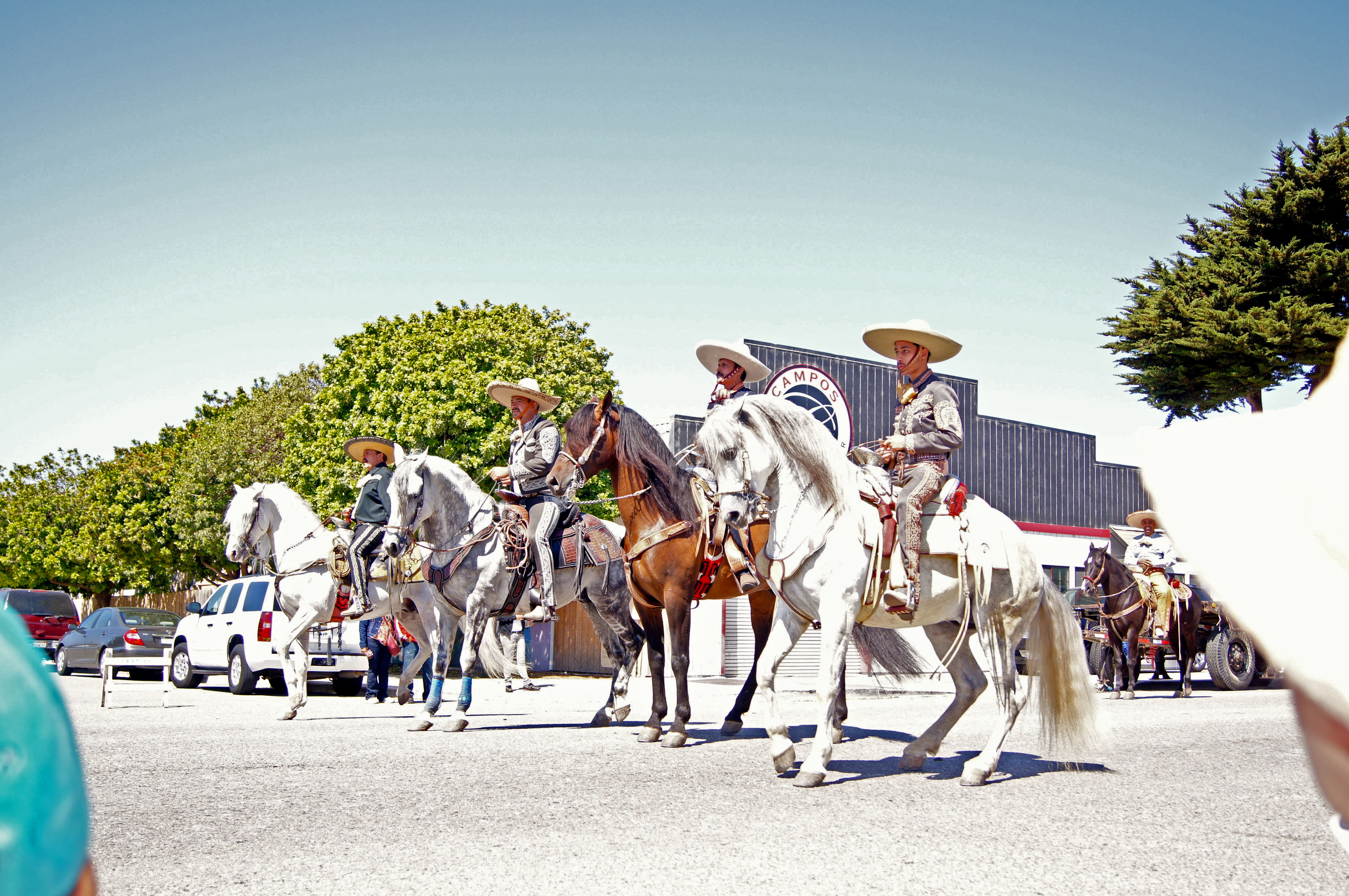
Parade Mexican Charros and Horses

The Artichoke Festival evolved from an earlier May Days Parade and band competition. A pancake breakfast and a barbecue were added to the event and, in 1959, a band leader and three local business owners formed the Castroville Artichoke Advisory Board. The board came up with the name Castroville Artichoke Festival. The two-day event is held every year in May, originally in Castroville and, since 2014, at the Monterey County Fair and Event Center. In 2009, the festival marked its 50th year, and in 2011, 20,000 people attended the festival.

Marilyn Monroe was crowned the 1st Honorary Artichoke Queen in 1948, Sally DeSante Hebert was crowned the 1st Festival Artichoke Queen in 1961 and the first Artichoke King was Andrew O'Desky in 1974. William Hung was crowned the Artichoke King on May 21, 2006.

=== The festival in the 21st century ===
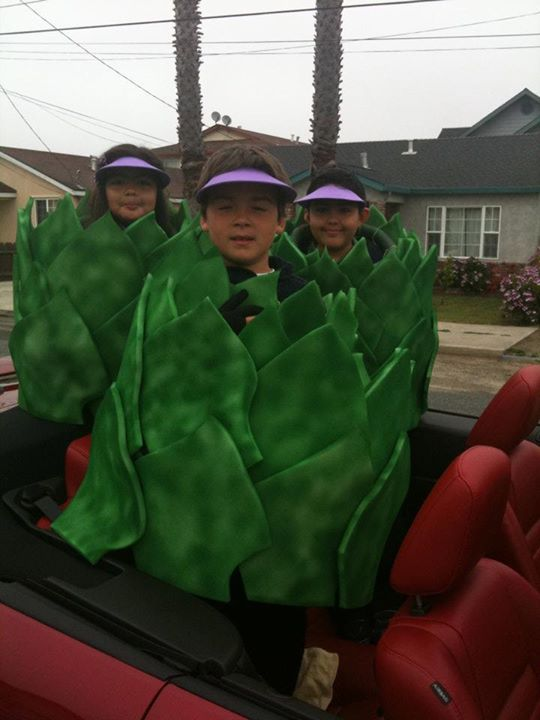
Artichoke Kids

The festival was sponsored by local artichoke companies. It included a parade, live music, an agro art competition with three-dimensional fruit and vegetable artwork, farmers markets, field tours, artichoke souvenirs sales, wine, beer & spirits garden, cooking demos, 5k beach run, canasta (basket) race, quilt challenge, and a Marilyn Monroe look-a-like contest. The food at the festival included artichokes – fried, sauteed, grilled, marinated, pickled, fresh, and creamed as soup, and cooked into cupcakes.

2020 saw the festival's cancellation caused by the COVID-19 pandemic; and the 61st anniversary was deferred to 2021. The festival was permanently ended in 2025 due to financial issues.

== In popular culture ==
In the Toot & Puddle episode "Putting the Art in Artichoke," the title characters visit Castroville for the Artichoke Festival.

In the Netflix series Stranger Things, the character Dustin wears a Castroville Artichoke Festival shirt in episodes 6–8.

== See also ==
- Food festival
