= Princes Wharf =

Prince's Wharf, or Princes Wharf, may refer to:

- Princes Wharf, Auckland, a wharf in Auckland Harbour, Auckland, New Zealand
- Prince's Wharf, Bristol, a wharf in Bristol Harbour, Bristol, England
- Princes Wharf, Hobart, a wharf in Hobart, Tasmania, Australia
