= Taste of Summer =

Food festival in Hobart, Australia

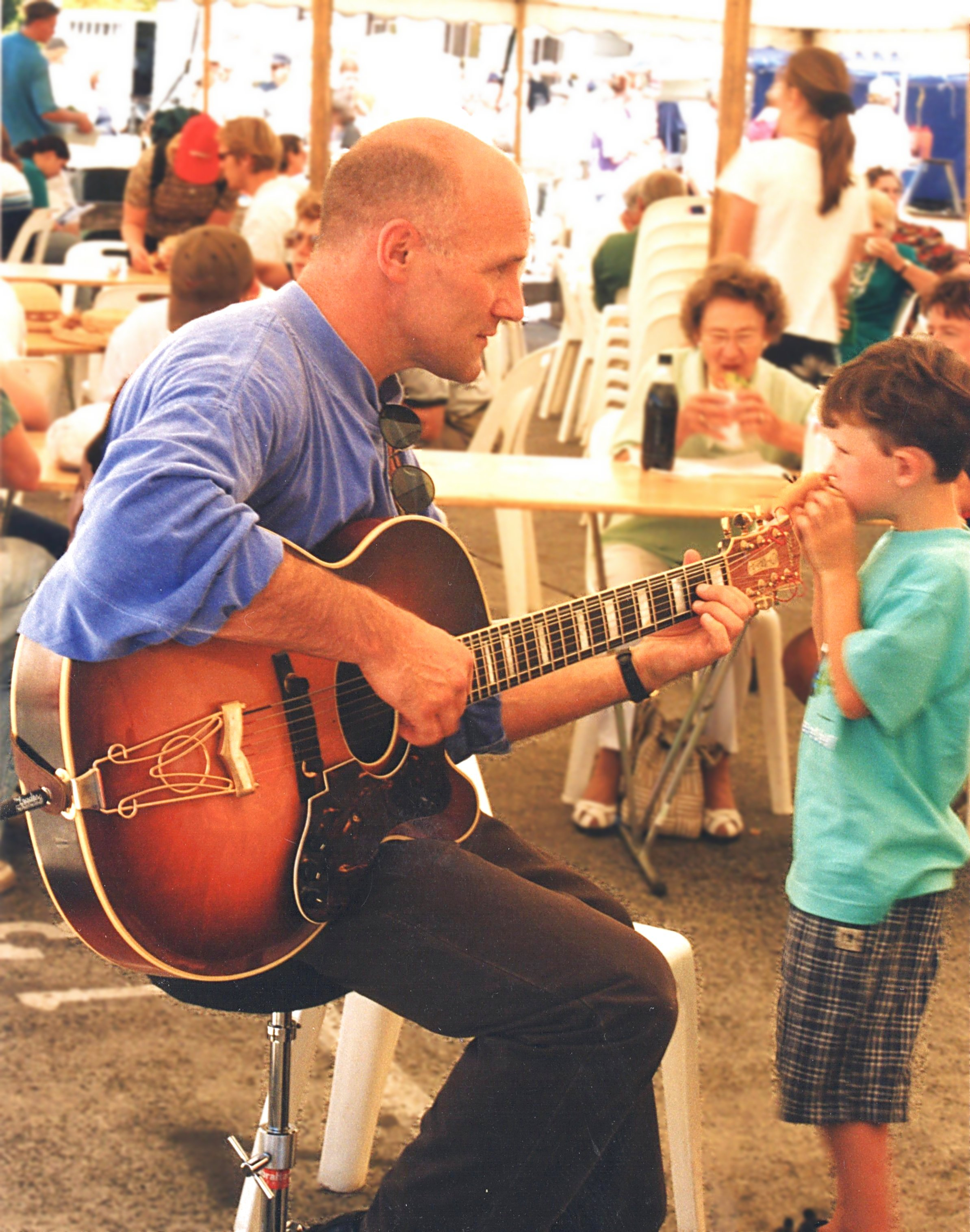
- Musician playing his guitar during the festival 1998

Information
- Status: Active
- Frequency: Annually
- Most recent: 27 December 2003 – 6 January 2024
- Venue: Princes Wharf N1 and Salamanca Place
- Location: Hobart, Tasmania
- Country: Australia
- Inaugurated: 1988
- Attendance: Close to 100,000 (2023)
- Current organisers: Pinpoint Group PTY LTD
- Previous organisers: Hobart City Council
- Website: tasteofsummer.com.au

The Taste of Summer Festival, previously known as the Taste of Tasmania, is an annual event held in Hobart, Tasmania, from 27 December to 6 January. The festival includes over 75 stalls featuring local breweries, distilleries, wineries, and eateries, drawing in both locals and tourists from around the globe. Hosted at Princes Wharf Nº1, adjacent to the historic Salamanca Place, the festival coincides with the State's peak of the tourism season. Additionally, Hobart's waterfront is the place where New Year's Eve festivities are celebrated, including the Sydney to Hobart Yacht Race, "one of the world's greatest, and hardest, offshore races," as described by The New York Times. Visitors have the opportunity to taste the Tasmanian cuisine and beverages while enjoying live music and entertainment provided by a diverse selection of interstate performers. The event serves as an example of the significant role tourism plays in the economy of Australia. Beyond offering a platform for displaying local products, Taste of Summer generates socio-economic benefits such as job creation and amplifies the region's food and wine industry. Also, the active participation of the community in organising, managing, and providing entertainment emphasize their role in economic development. The diversity of Taste of Summer allows interconnection within the communities through "employment, volunteerism, networks and participation."

== History ==
Taste of Tasmania was a celebration of the state's culinary excellence and a stage for local produce. Its origins back to 1988 when the Hobart City Council introduced it as part of the Hobart Summer Festival. One of its main goals was to entertain the competitors of the Sydney to Hobart Yacht Race. Combined with the yacht race, The Taste of Tasmania became the centre of the entertainment on the waterfront. As their arrival port, the yachties were going to find a more vibrant setting to celebrate the New Year's festivities. At the beginning, the Hobart City Council managed the inaugural festival, and its subsequent editions for over three decades. Due positive response from stallholders, locals and visitors, the Taste of Tasmania transitioned from three days to seven, making of Sullivans Cove and Salamanca Place a festive stage that presented Tasmanian food, drinks, restaurants, local produce, and entertainment.

As one of the biggest food and wine festivals in Australia, by the 1990s, the Taste of Tasmania brought together 64 stallholders and 24 local wineries, with around 300.000 visitors, more than half of Tasmania's population at the time. The line of restaurants on the waterfront took this opportunity to integrate to their menus local produce such as fish, cheese, fruits, and wines. The festival stallholders were so keen on the event's outcomes that the Taste of Tasmania became an annual "gigantic feast." In 1996, the 200-metre (660 ft)-long shed Princes Wharf Nº1 gathered together around 100 local producers and sustainable measurements, such as the use of biodegradable plates, took place that year. Among the celebrations, there were cooking classes that showed the visitors culinary creations. Quails, scallops, strawberries, and flavoured-infused ice cream were part of the selected fresh produce that visitors had the opportunity to try while enjoying the multiple street entertainment. There was no cost for admission and the trading hours of the multiple daily events were from 11 am to 11 pm.

As the festival became an integral part of Tasmania's social calendar, during the end of 1999 and the beginning of 2000, more than 70 events including fine foods, arts, theatre, film, and sports were part of the program. That year the celebrations focused on the beginning of the new millennium. Two of the main highlights were the every day 15 hours of sunlight during the event, and Hobart receiving the first sunrise for 2000 in the country. The event included platinum sponsors that contributed to the festival through their reputation and background. The Decoration Project 2000 took place and offered awards for the ceiling decorations of the Princes Wharf Nº1. As one of the State's community art projects, these were a crucial part of the festival's identity and a way to display Tasmania's talented youth, as the participants were from different schools.

By 2018, within the framework of the festival's 30th anniversary, there were culinary events, food and wine stalls, and live entertainment. The program featured a diverse repertoire on cheese making, bush tucker tours, and gin tastings. In July 2018, the future of the event was discussed during the Hobart City Council workshop. The local government evaluated its operational model and "[explored] potential fund streams." At that time, the Taste of Tasmania had reached a crucial point and is pursuing collaboration among government and private parties to secure funding and sustain the event. In 2019-2020 edition of the festival, some of the events included the soprano Emma Bourke singing from a boat on the River Derwent, and the culinary event of the battle North vs South Tasmania, where stallholders showed the produce of their regions and the audience had to decide the winning producer among them. This was the last edition of the festival before the COVID-19 pandemic in 2020.

Until that point, the festival was organised and managed by the Hobart City Council. In 2021 the City Council voted "to divest itself of ownership and exclusive rights to the Taste of Tasmania, [...] due to rising costs of running the event." In 2021 the event transitioned and adopted a new name: The Taste of Summer. From that year, the Pinpoint Group, a private consortium of Tasmanian businesspeople, "planned and delivered" the festival by featuring changes to its branding and identity, keeping the core value of Tasmania produce only. To this day, the Taste of Summer continues highlighting Tasmania's local produce, including food, wine, and culture.

== Events ==
Cultural festivals like the Taste of Summer embody the essence of local traditions. The source considers that by having a strong main theme and a high profile, the festival is popular and relevant to locals who support this event with their community energy. It has included a diverse range of events since 1988, and some of them include food and wine tasting, cooking demonstrations and masterclasses by chefs, fine dining experiences at the local restaurants near the waterfront, cultural performances, workshops, family-friendly activities, market stalls, and special events such as the New Year's fireworks. First, the Hobart City Council and now the Pinpoint group have been more concentrated on strategies to make the event and the city more festive among locals and visitors. The diverse character of a place, for instance the waterfront zones, such as Salamanca Place and the Prince Wharf Nº1, become major tourist destinations during the festival, and these locations serve as the primary visual representation of the city.

=== Sydney to Hobart Yacht Race ===
The Sydney–Hobart Yacht Race is one of the international sporting events in Australia. It started on Boxing Day in 1945 with nine yachts as its inaugural fleet. Due to public interest, the race increased to an international level, and competitors, including Éric Tabarly and British Prime Minister Edward Heath, have been part of the event. By the 1970s various sponsors lent their names to the race, marking the beginning of a tradition. From 1988, the end of the race became part of one of the main attractions of the Taste of Tasmania as the racers needed to be entertained during the New Year's Eve season.

=== New Year's Eve Fireworks ===
One of the traditional activities of the Taste of Summer is the New Year's Eve fireworks. There are theme parties, and the fireworks display can be appreciated by visitors from different points of the docks area at Sullivans Cove.

=== The Buskers ===
The festival includes activities related to entertainment, including local and international buskers. In 1999, performers from Scotland, England and multiple locations in Australia were part of the program and their shows included "juggling, unicycling, escapology, classic clowning."

== Stalls ==
The Taste of Summer highlights the region local produce. Industries such as food, wineries, breweries, and distilleries, participate in the festival, showcasing Tasmanian food and beverage to visitors. Ciders, wine, non-alcoholic beverages, vegetables, fruit, and seafood are also part of the products from around Tasmania and "more than 30 per cent of the stalls" are from regional areas. Some of the participating stalls include international cuisine from Latin America, Italy, China, Lebanon, Nepal, and Indonesia, among others.

== Participation in awards and recognition ==
In 2023, the Qantas Australian Tourism Awards declared the Taste of Summer festival as one of the eight finalists in the category of Major Festivals & Events.

== Gallery ==
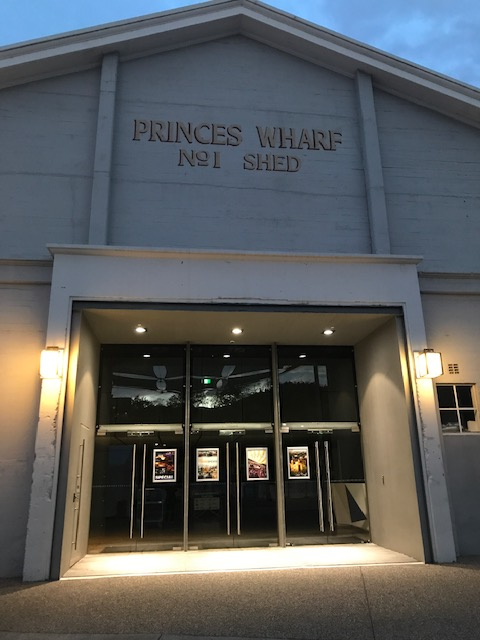
Princes Wharf, Hobart, Tasmania

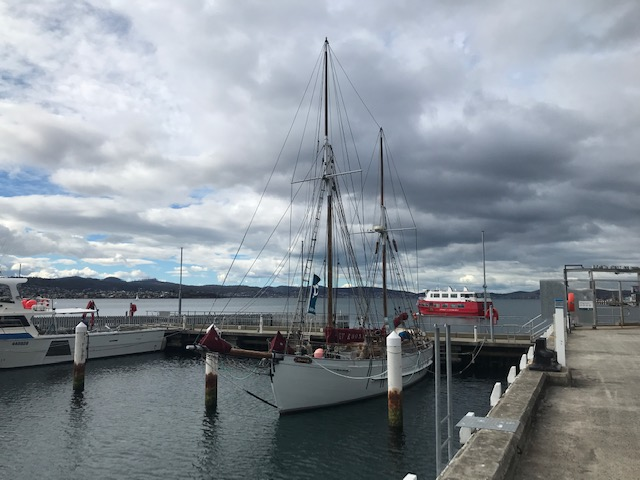
A yacht near Princes Wharf N1 in Hobart, Tasmania

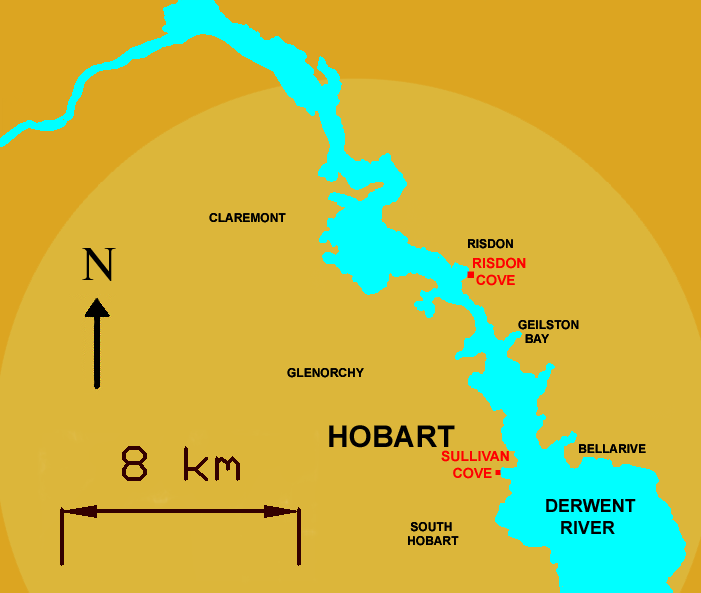
Map of the River Derwent in Hobart, showing the position of Sullivans Cove

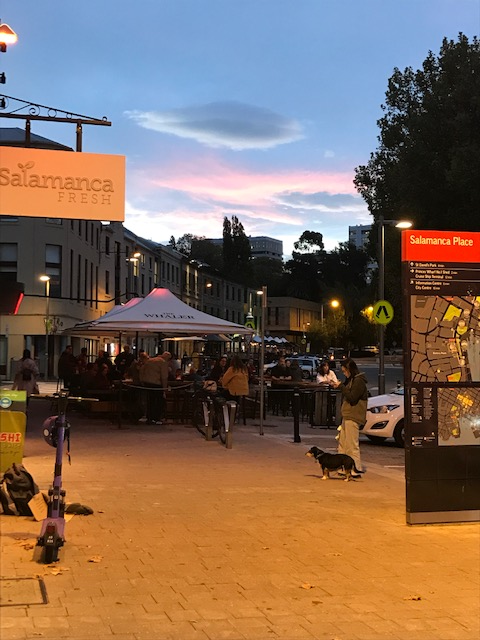
Salamanca Place and the bars along the restaurant line in Hobart, Tasmania

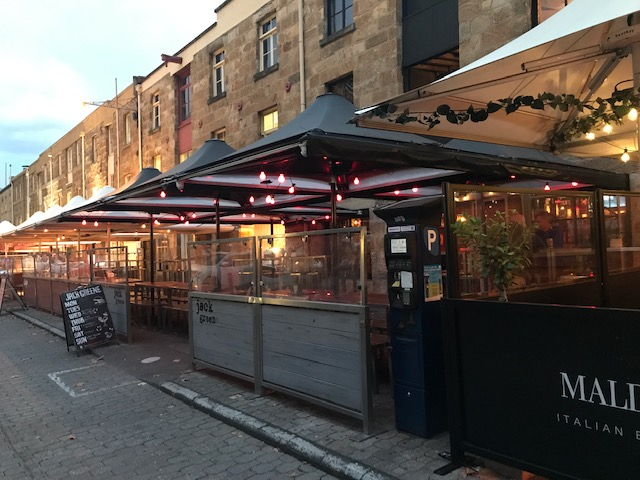
Line of restaurants at Salamanca Place in Hobart, Tasmania

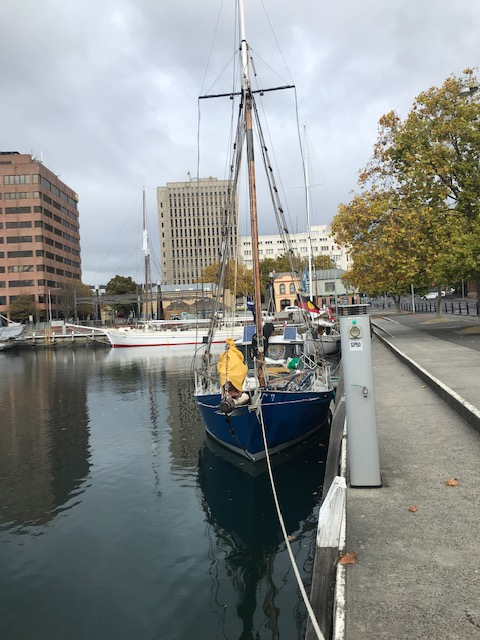
Blue boat near Salamanca Place, at the waterfront in Hobart

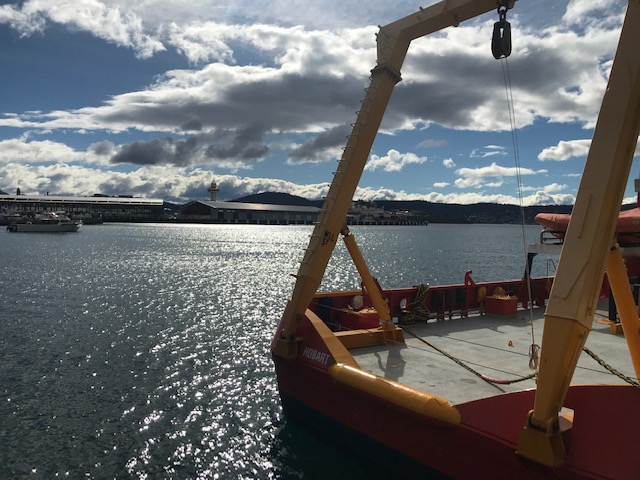
Waterfront near Salamanca Place and Princes Wharf N1

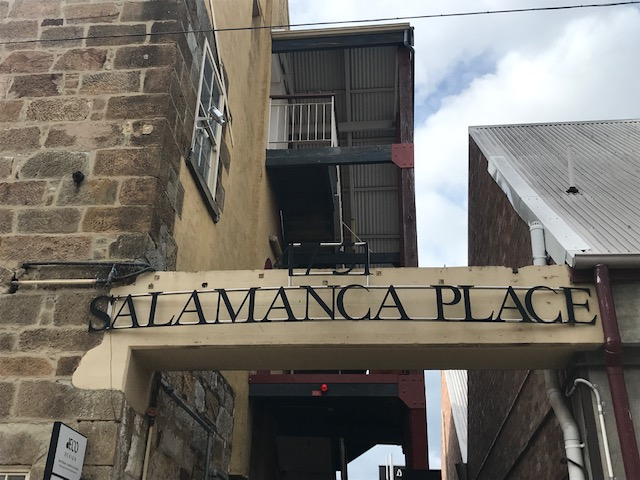
The sign of one of the entries at Salamanca Place in Hobart, Tasmania

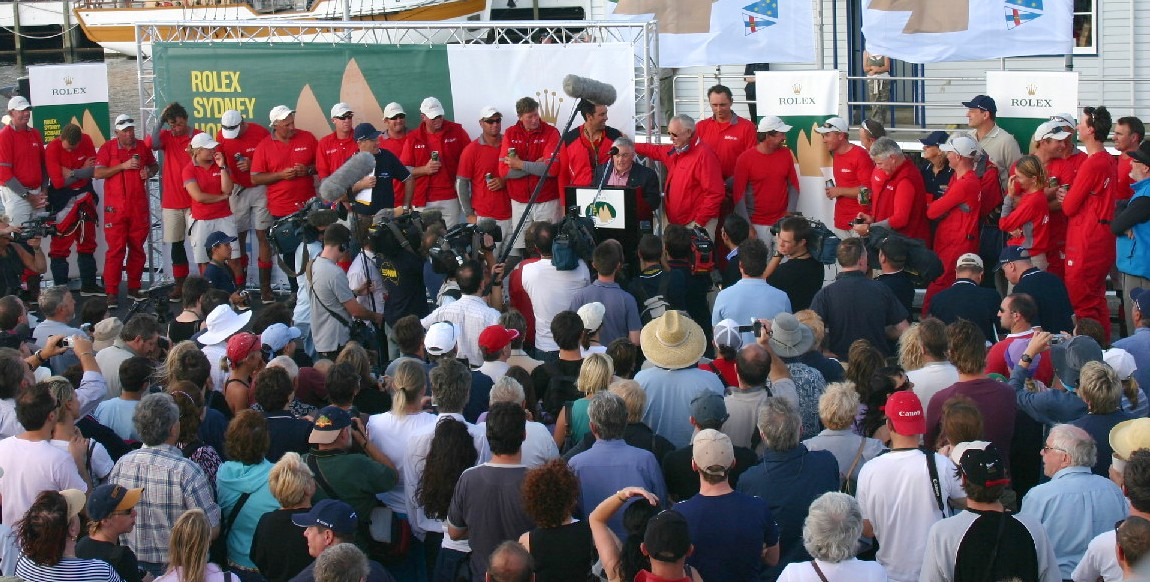
The crew of the 2005 winner of the Sydney to Hobart Yacht Race

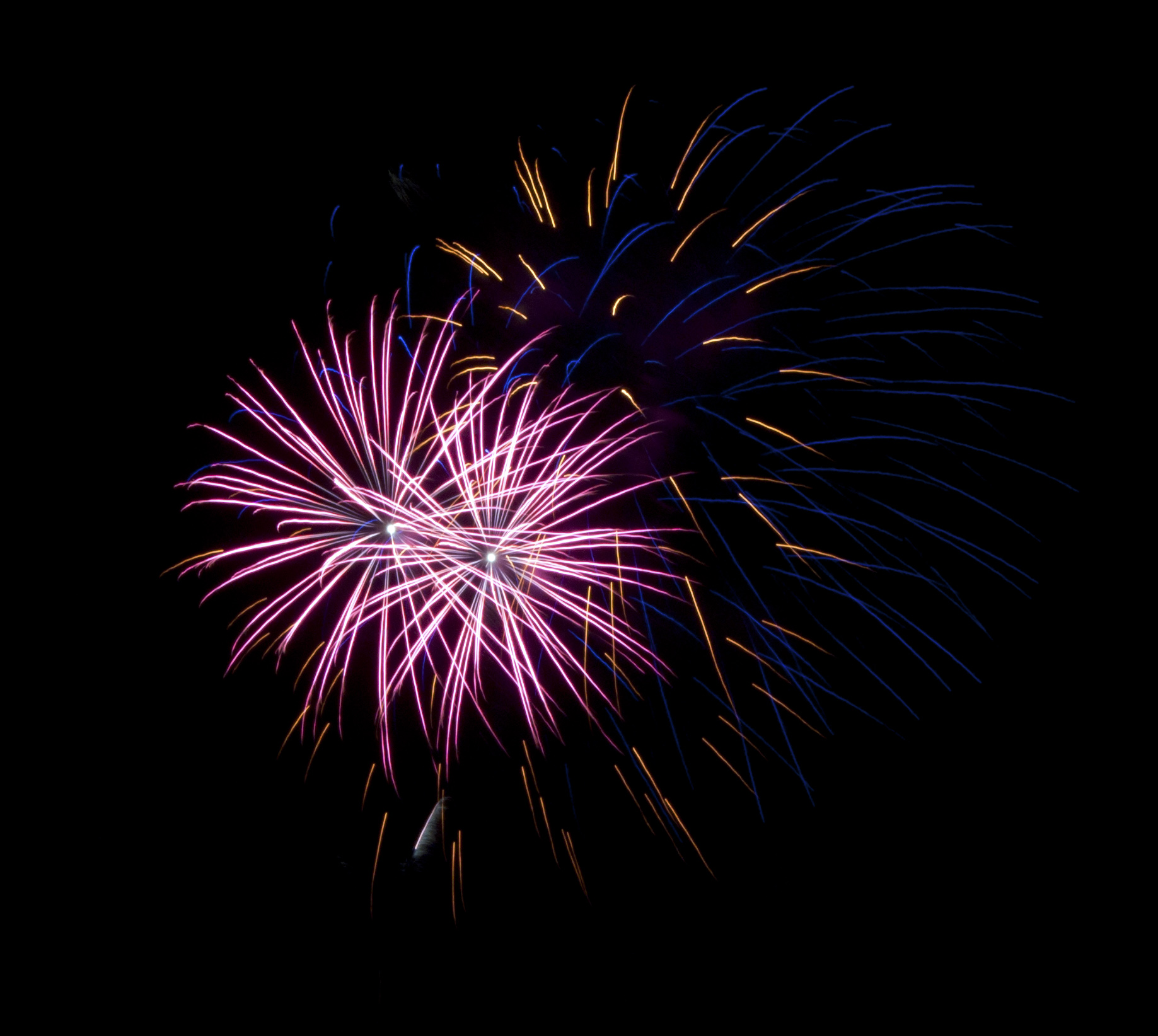
NYE Fireworks 2010

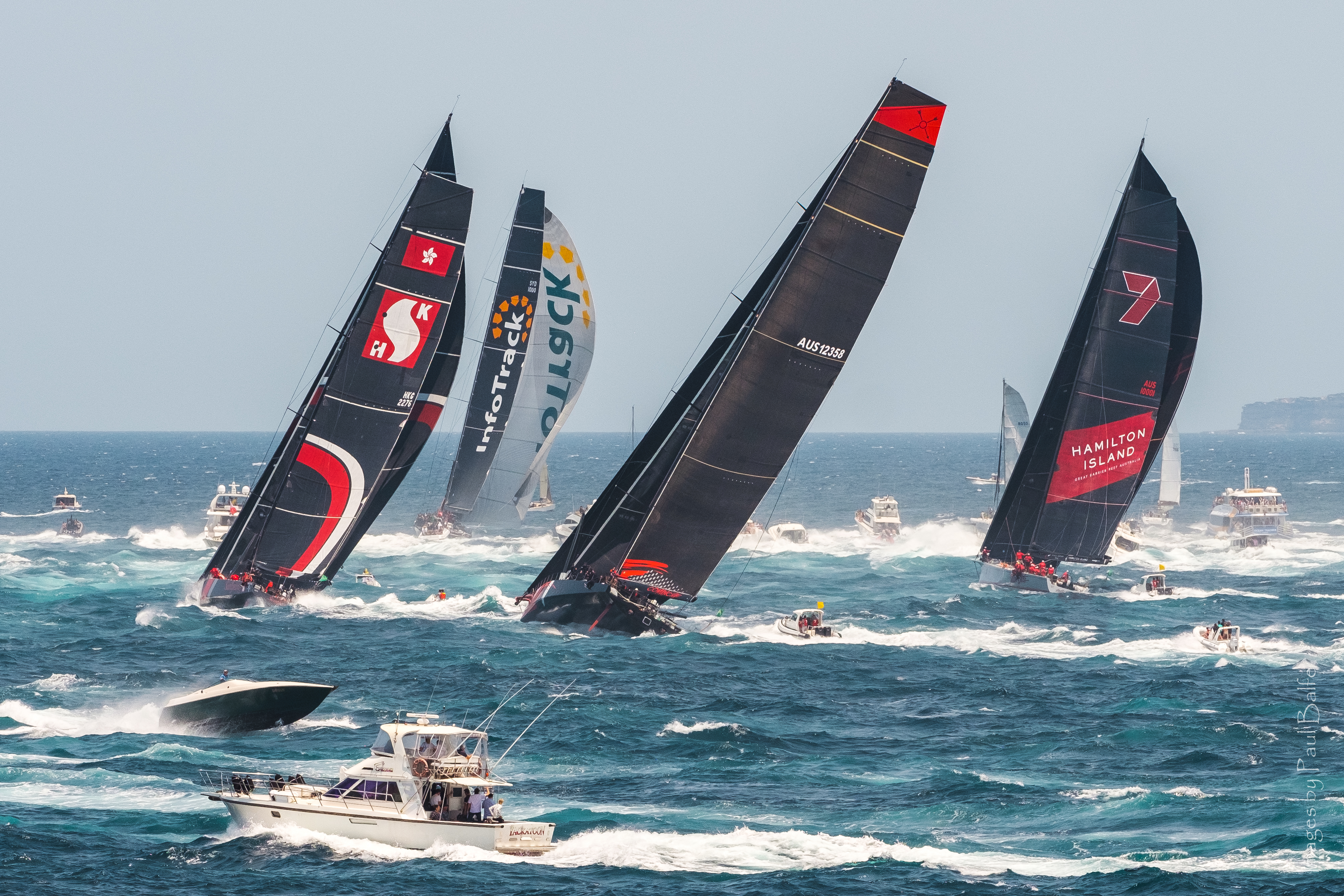
Sydney to Hobart Yacht Race

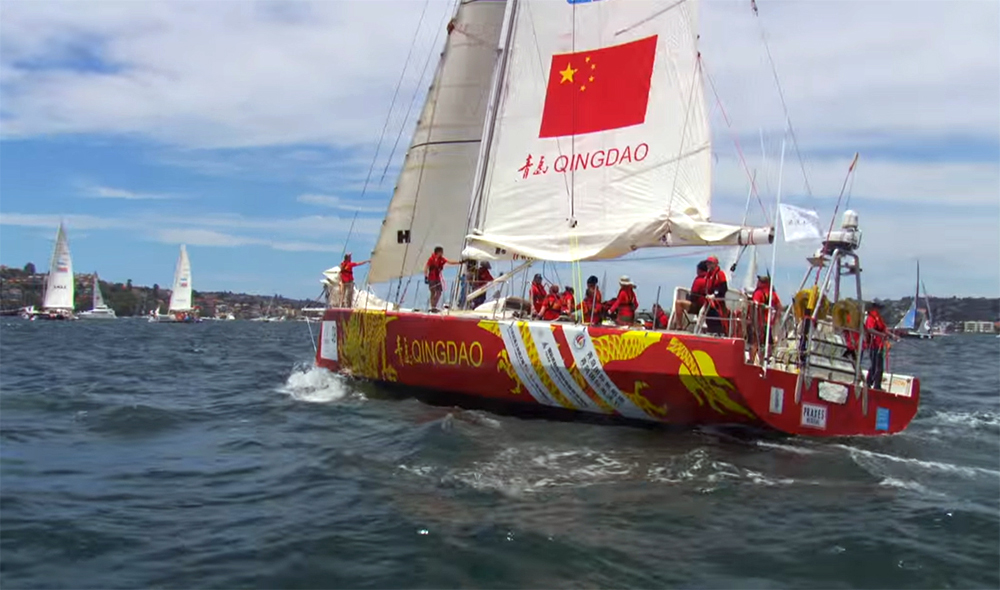
Chinese yacht competing at the Sydney to Hobart Yacht Race 2015

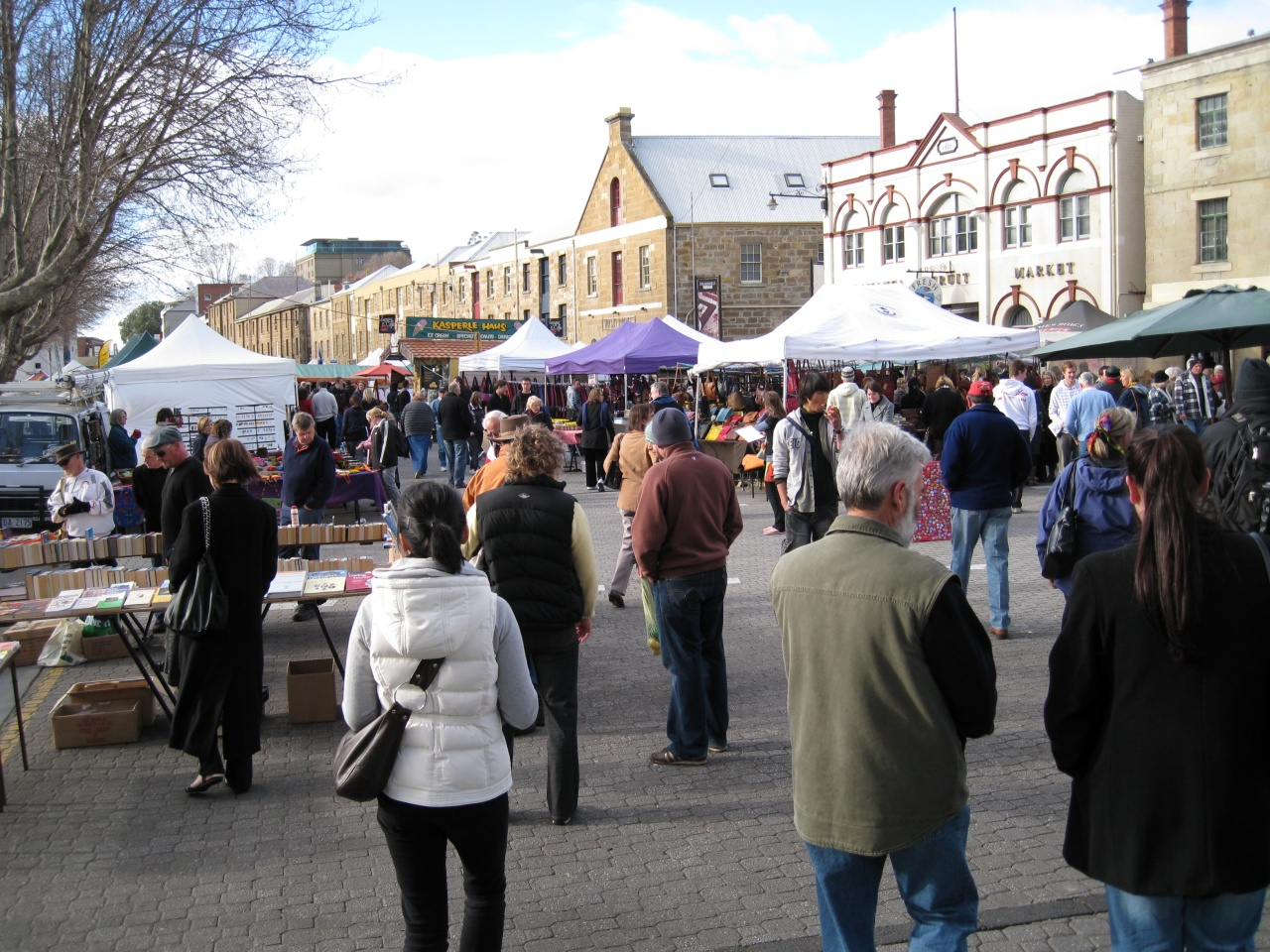
Salamanca Place in Hobart, Tasmania

Wine tasting during the festival in Hobart, Tasmania

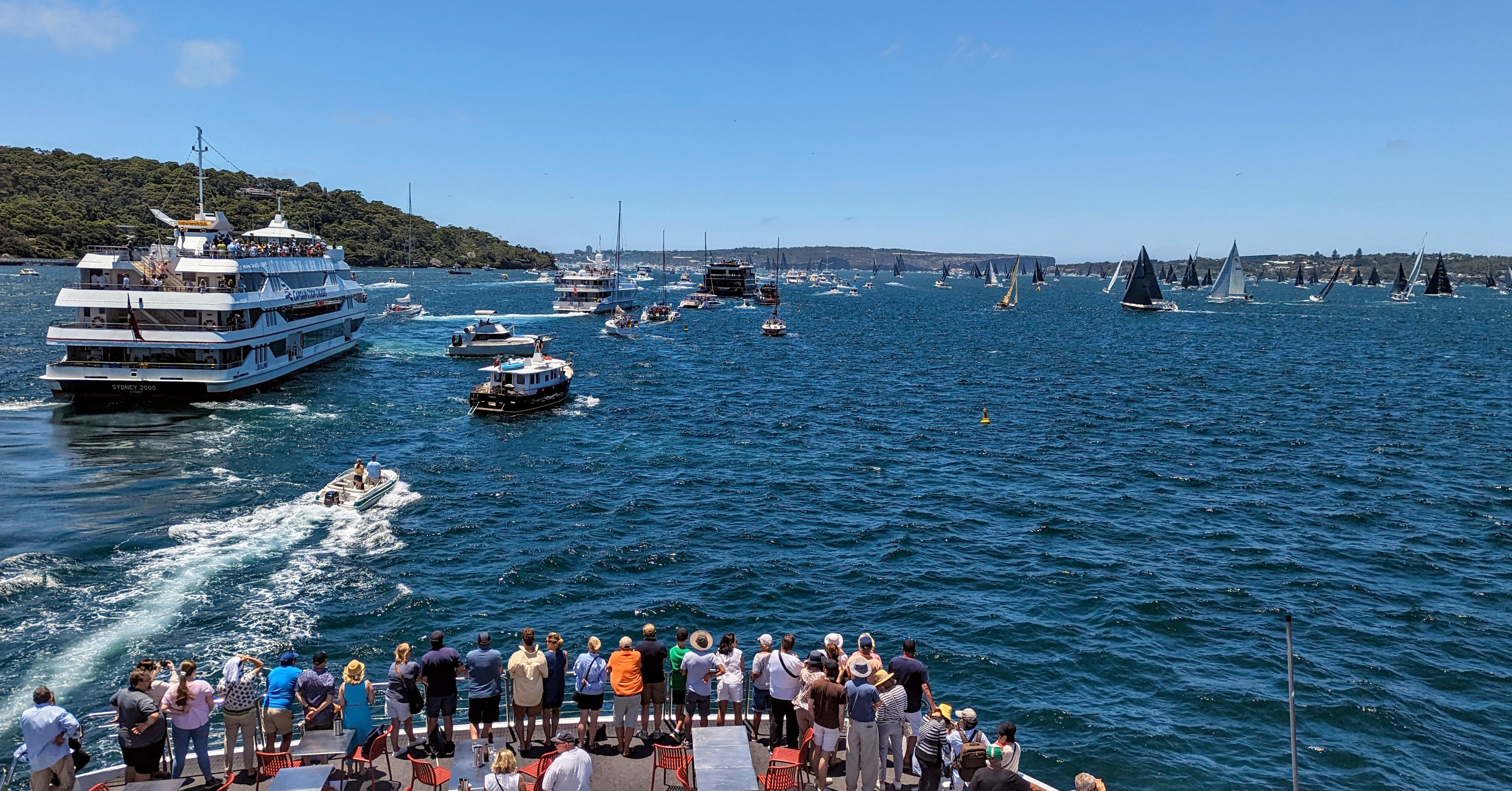
Sydney to Hobart Yacht Race spectators in Sydney, New South Wales

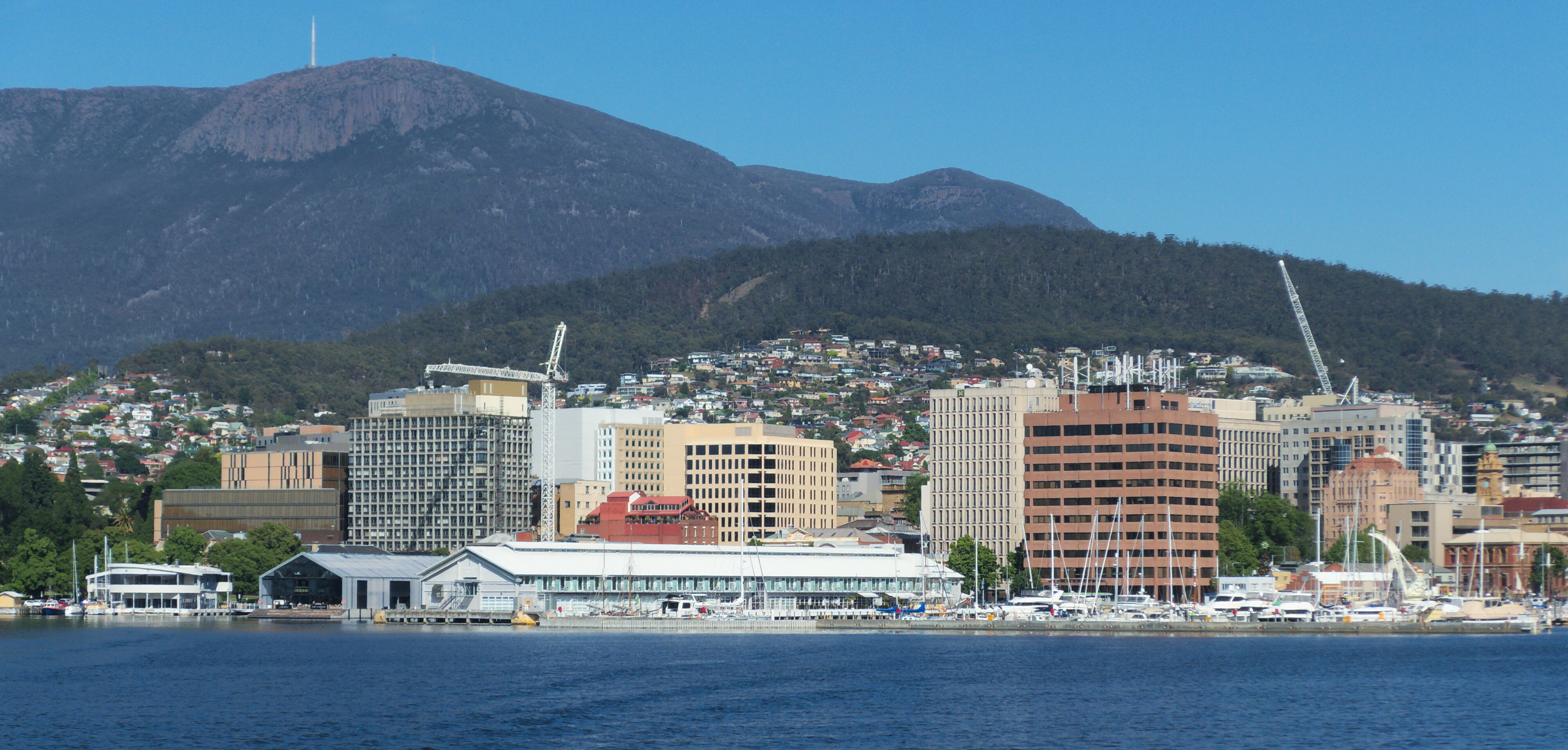
Panoramic picture of Hobart, Tasmania

== See also ==
- List of events in Tasmania
