= Princes Wharf, Hobart =

Building in Hobart, Tasmania

Coordinates: 42.8861°S 147.3349°E

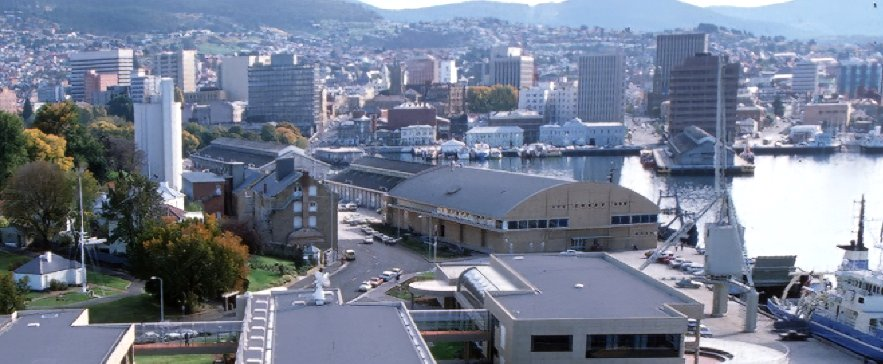
Princes Wharf, Hobart, Tasmania c.1984 (crop from larger image) showing Shed 1 in the furthest distance, Shed 2 in the middle distance, and Shed 3 (with curved roof - repurposed for use by CSIRO) in the centre of the frame. Shed 2 has since been replaced by a new building created for the University of Tasmania's Institute for Marine and Antarctic Studies (IMAS).

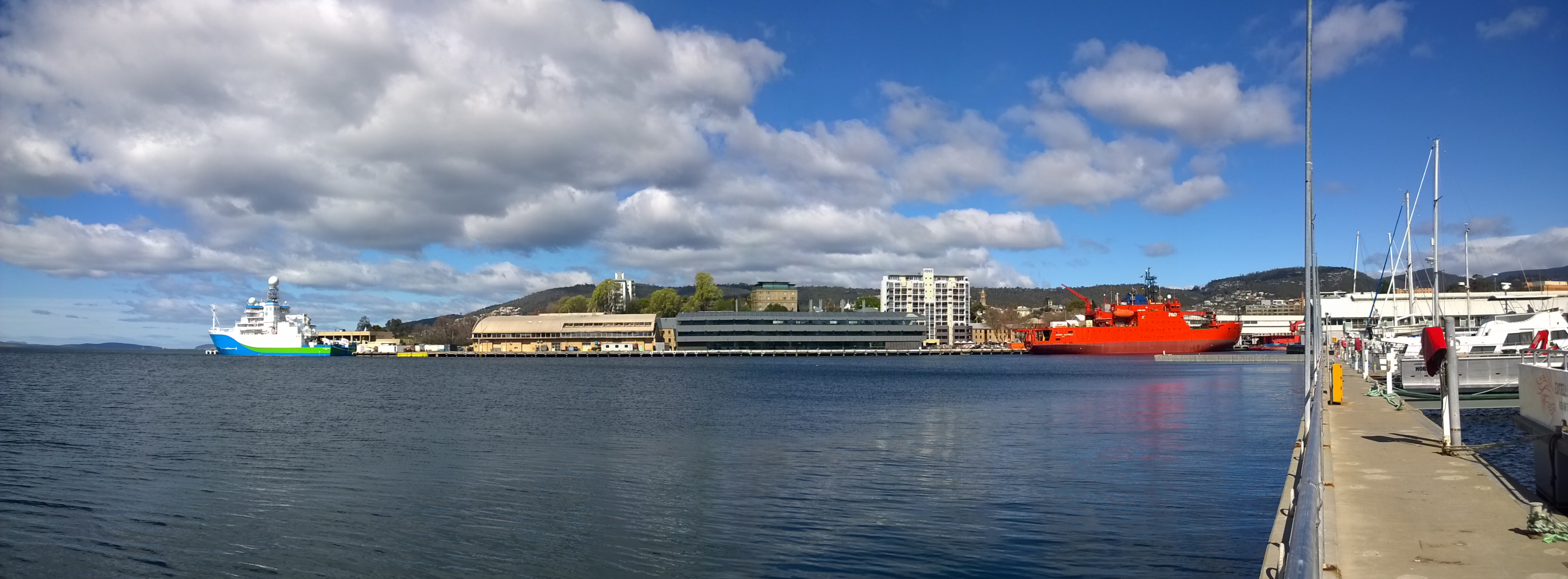
Distant view of Princes Wharf, 2014, with 2 research vessels (RV Investigator and RSV Aurora Australis) at the wharf side. Behind them, left to right, are a portion of the CSIRO Marine Laboratories (Block 2); Block 1 of the Marine Laboratories, originally Princes Wharf Shed 3; the University of Tasmania's IMAS building (site of former Shed 2); a gap; then Shed 1 (mostly obscured).

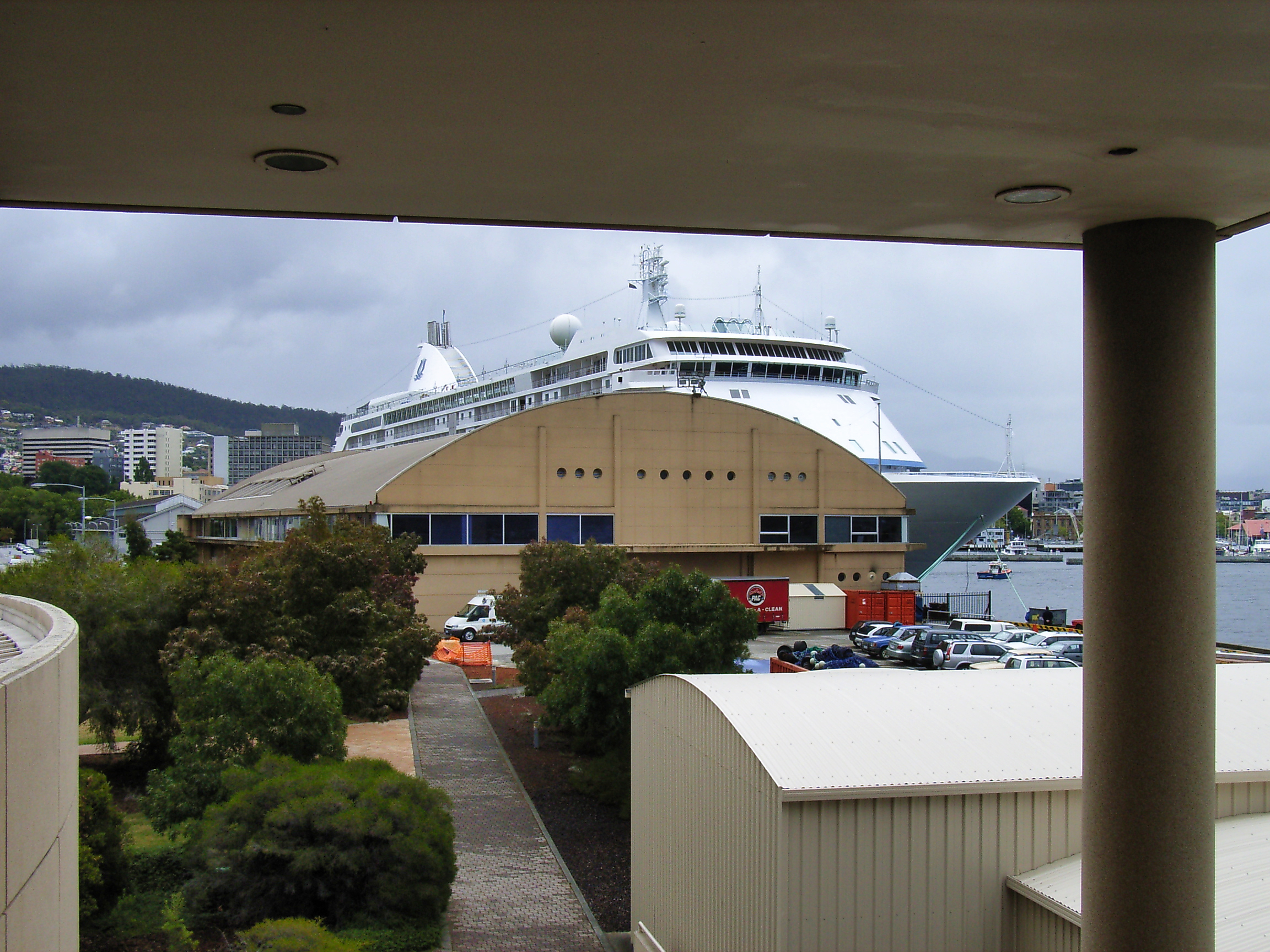
CSIRO Marine Laboratories, Hobart Block 1, Feb 2005 (former Princes Wharf No. 3 Shed), with part of the original Shed 2 behind

Princes Wharf is a wharf in the historic port area of Sullivans Cove in Hobart, Tasmania in Australia. The wharf area includes Princes Wharf No 1 Shed (known as PW1) that is a multi-purpose community events centre, and has been home to the Taste of Tasmania Festival. The wharf also at one time housed the No 2 shed, subsequently the location of the University of Tasmania's Institute for Marine and Antarctic Studies, and the No 3 shed, redeveloped to form the support facilities building for the CSIRO Marine Laboratories complex, which occupies a site initially created (using land reclamation) as a ferry terminal for the Empress of Australia. The CSIRO wharf (technically Princes Wharf number four) now forms the home base for the Marine National Facility, currently (2026) the RV Investigator.

== History ==
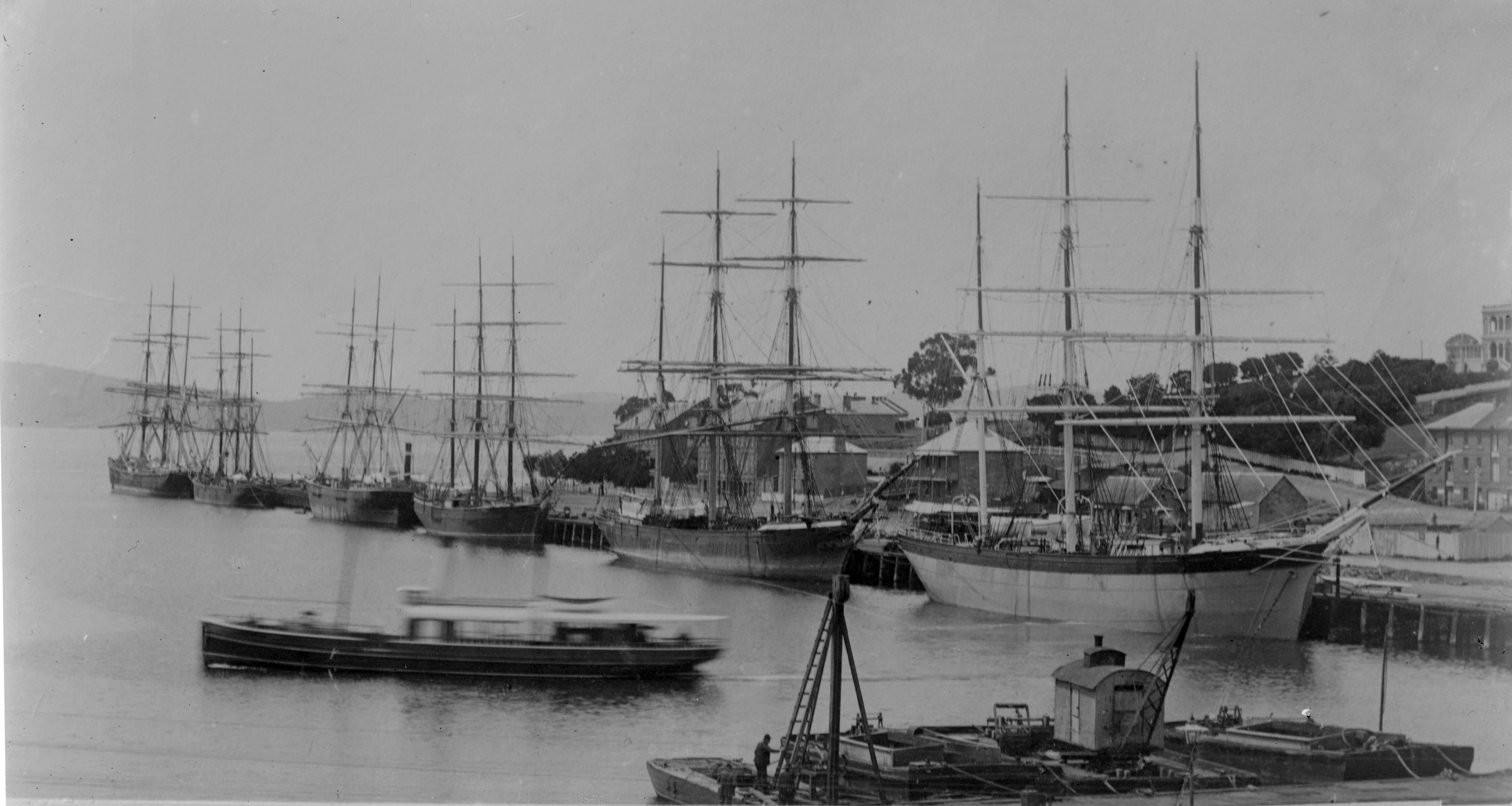
Princes Wharf - unknown date. Ships at dock including Harriet McGregor, Asia, Wild Wave and Chili

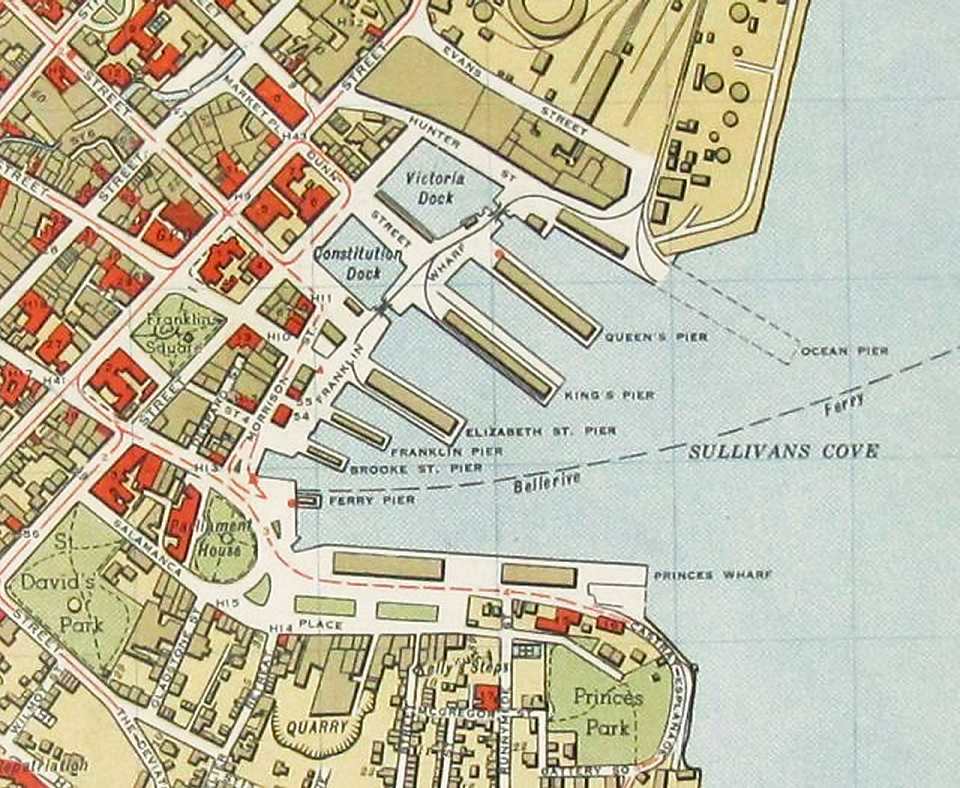
Princes Wharf and Sullivans Cove on a 1954 map. Sheds 1 and 2 are shown but not Shed 3, completed 1953, nor is the 1960s extension used first for the Empress of Australia ferry terminal and later for the CSIRO Marine Laboratories site.

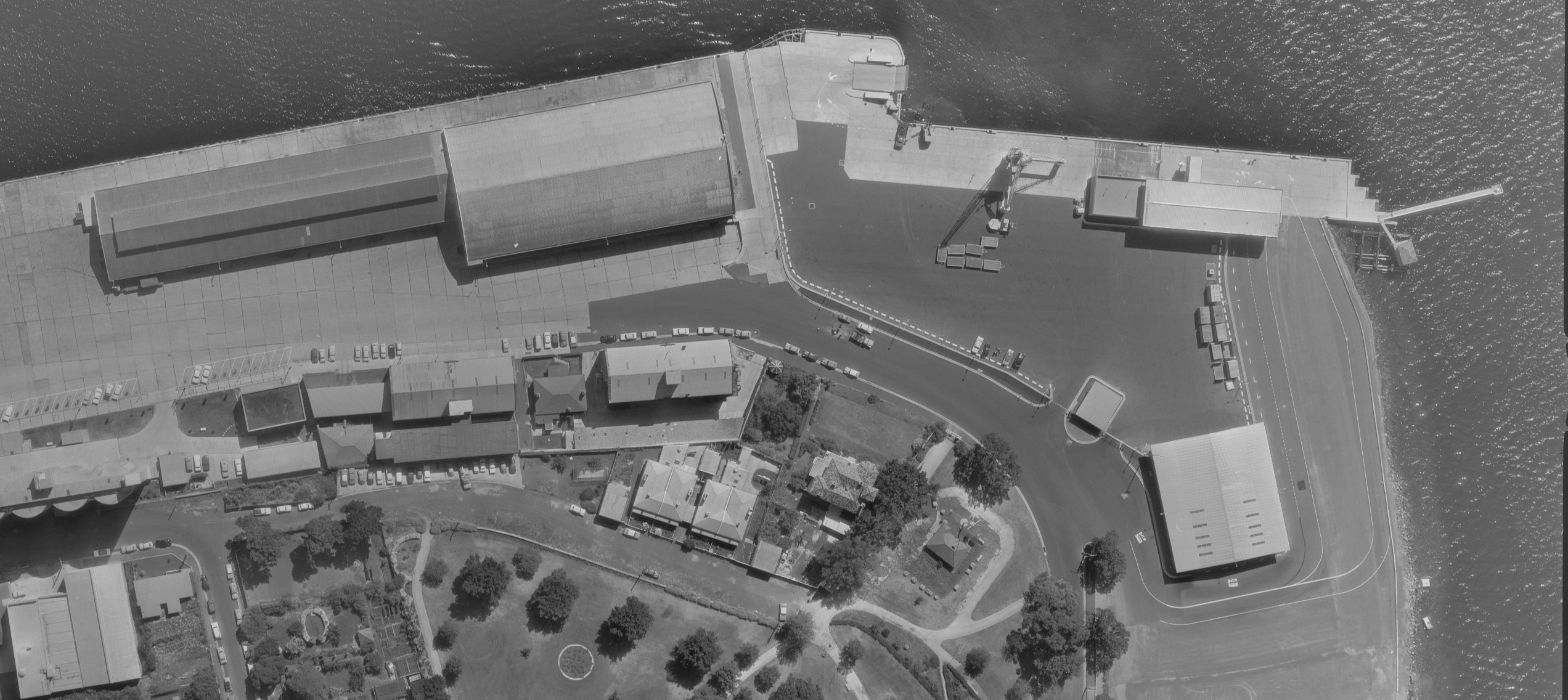
Princes Wharf, Tasmania, seaward end, aerial view 17 Feb 1965 (Lands Dept., Tasmania) showing sheds 2 and 3 plus the (then) Empress of Australia ferry terminal (at right)

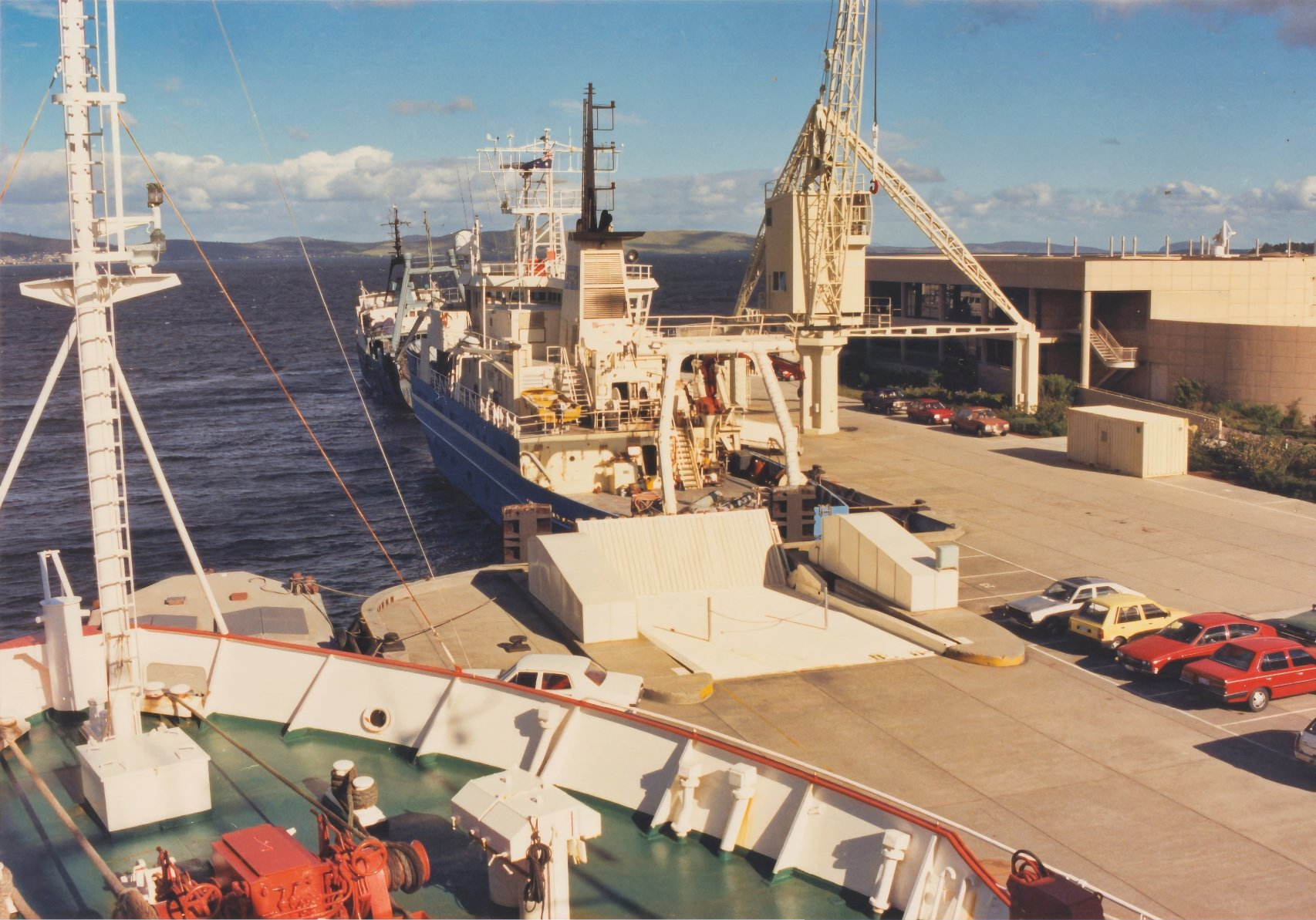
CSIRO wharf, Hobart with research vessels, January 1988. The loading ramp and crane remain from the Empress of Australia ferry terminal, while the sandstone-finish block at right is part of the Marine Laboratories complex, constructed 1983–1984.

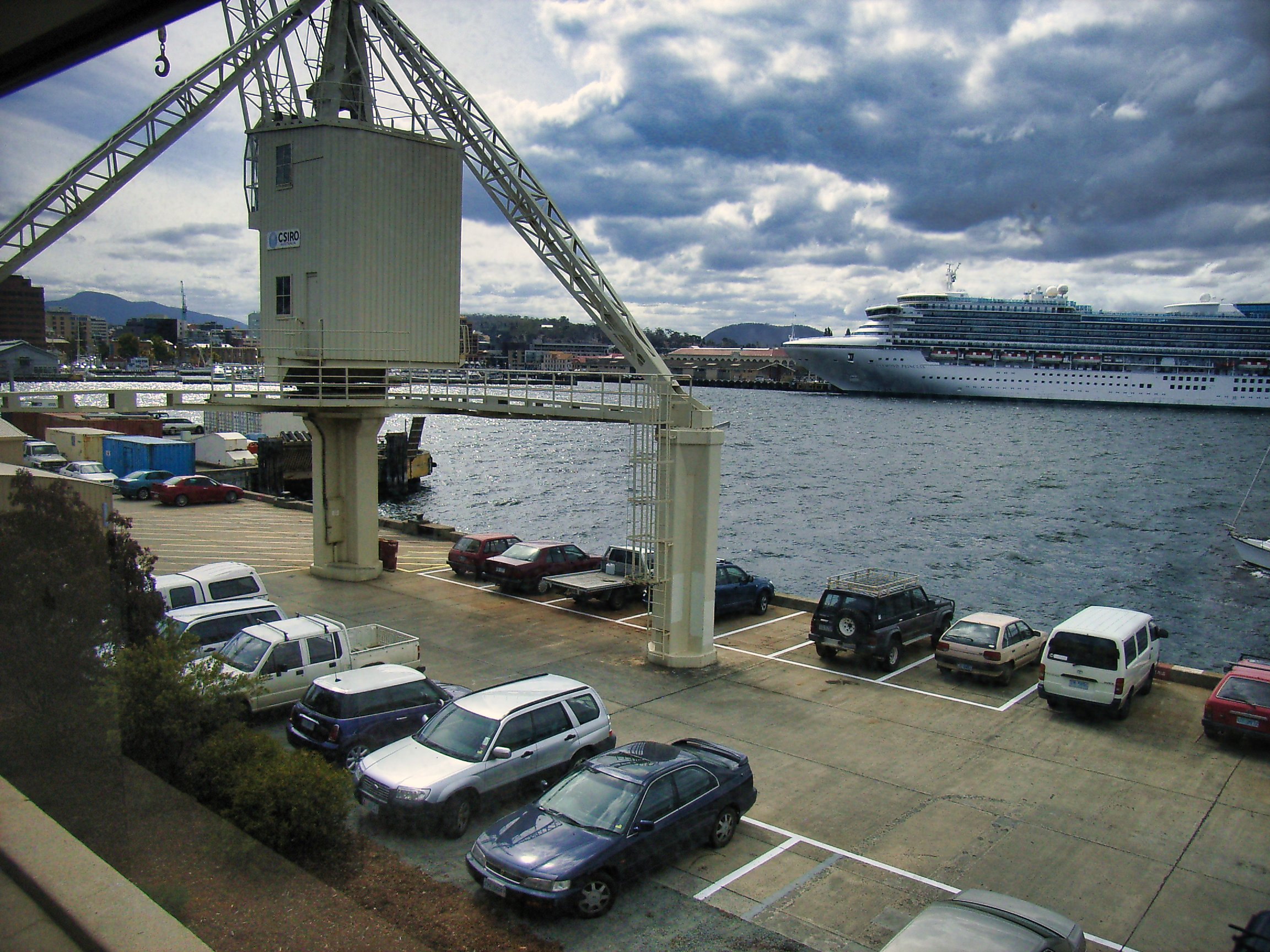
CSIRO wharf (=Princes Wharf No 4) viewed from the CSIRO Marine Laboratories administration building, February 2009. The wharf crane, inherited from the Empress of Australia ferry terminal days, was eventually removed c.2010.

The first wharf in Hobart was established in 1810 at Hunter Street. Traders at the time were not content with the location of the wharf: "It was a bit shallow and was exposed to some of the winds coming up the Derwent". A new wharf was built in the 1830s adjacent to Salamanca Place. Further development work began in 1890 to accommodate up to five vessels. A little ‘boat harbour’ was formed at the end of the wharf near the landing stage between it and Castray Esplanade known as Princes Steps. This is where the Duke of Edinburgh landed when he visited the port in 1868. By 1903, the new wharf was renamed Princes Wharf.

World War 1 interrupted further development of the port area. By 1920 consideration had to be given to the replacement of the older piers as they were coming to the end of their useful lives.

=== Development 1935–1982 ===
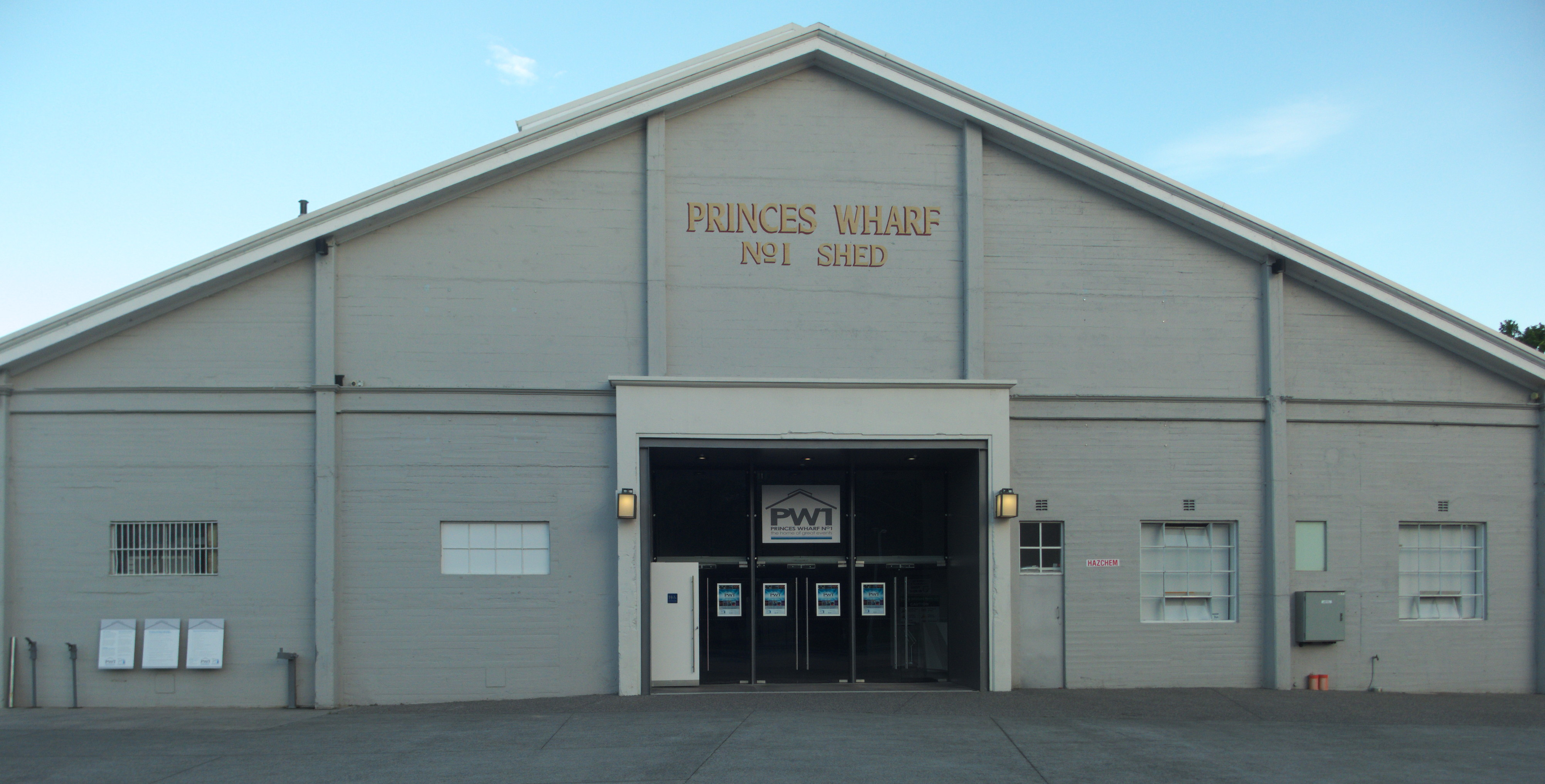
Princes Wharf No 1 Shed

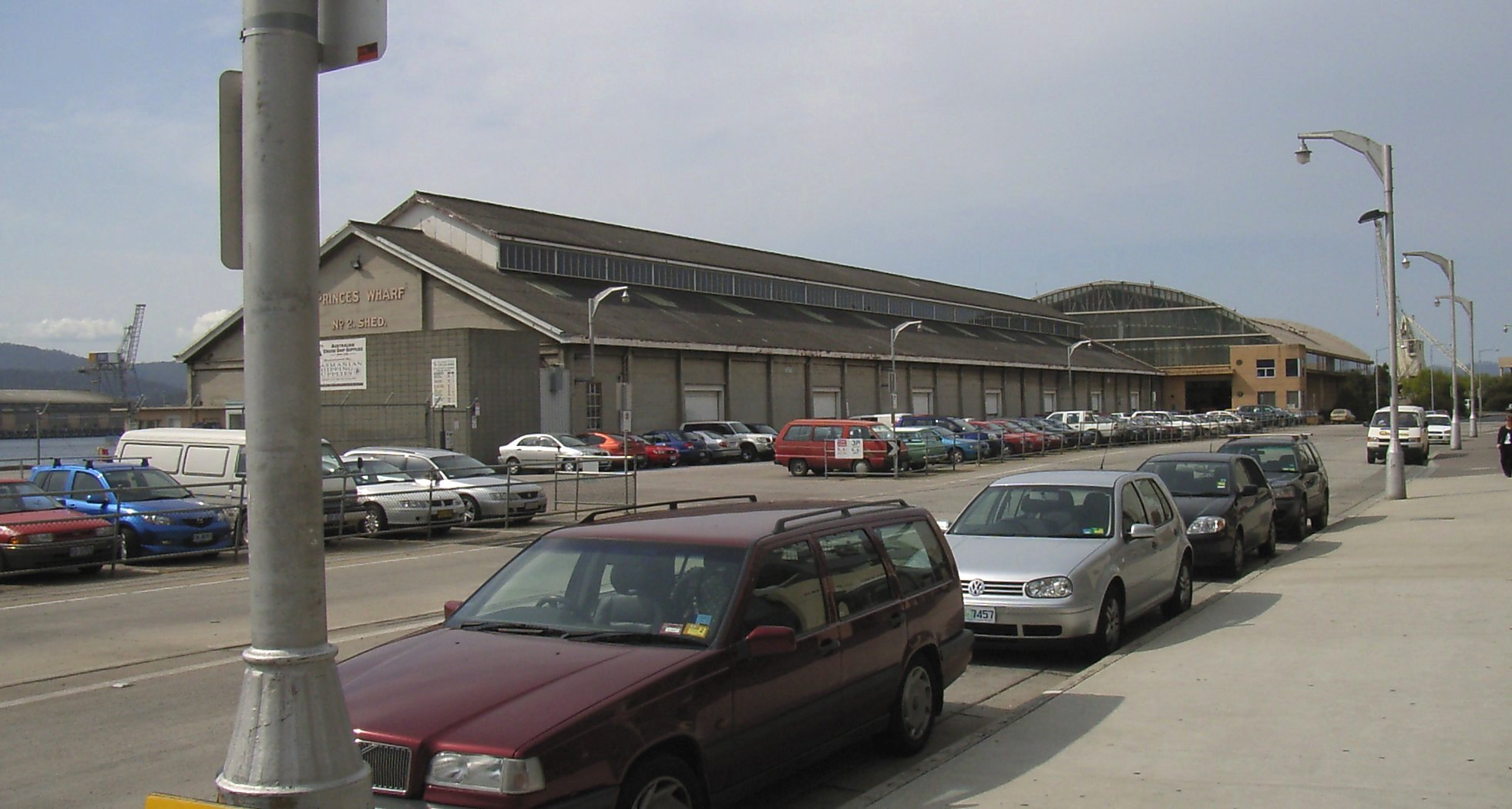
Princes Wharf Shed 2, Hobart, Tasmania, September 2005 (subsequently demolished)

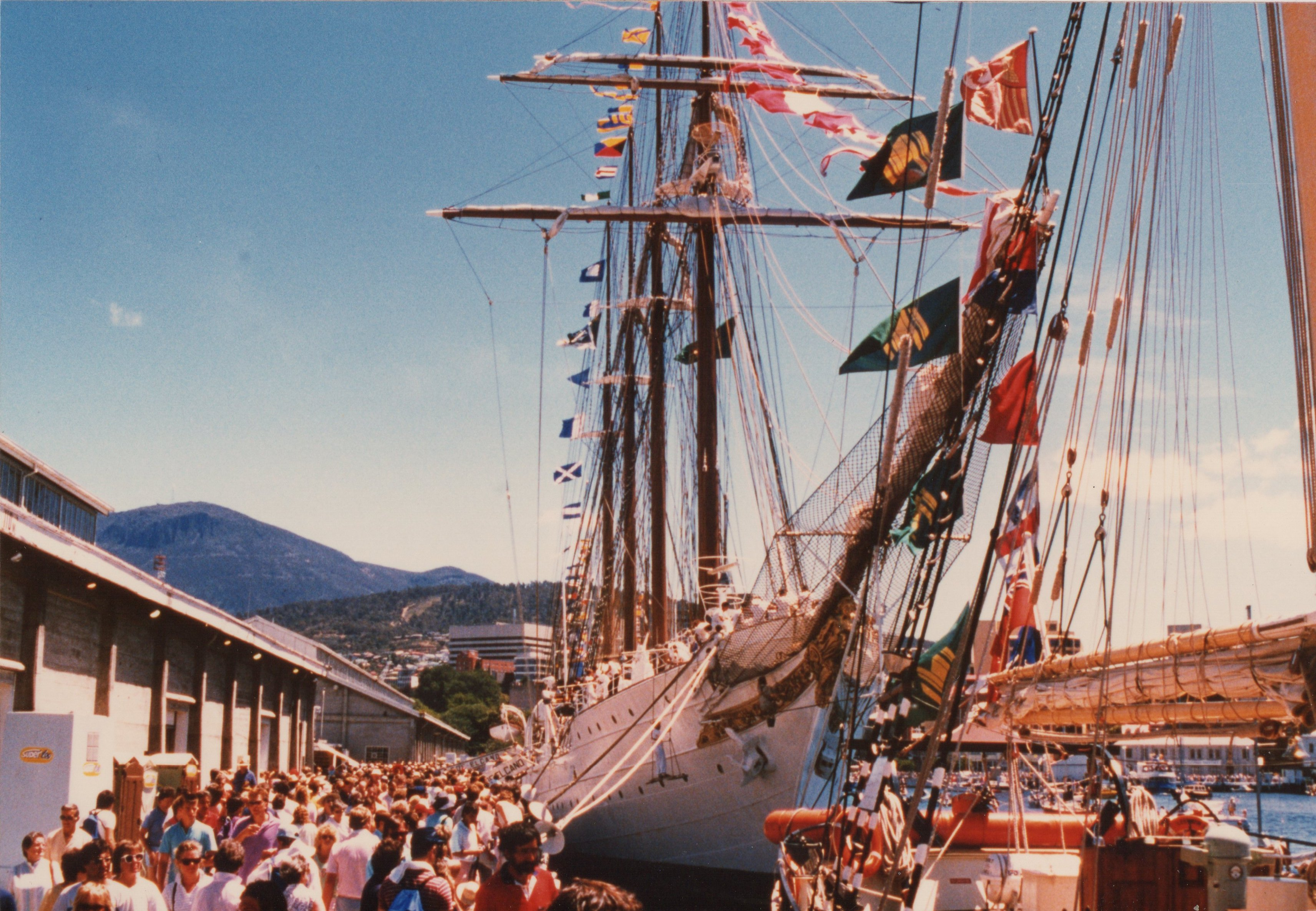
Princes Wharf during the Tall Ships visit to Hobart, January 1988

A complete rebuild of the wharf took place between 1936 and 1939 to form the current structure. In 1935, the Hobart Marine Board agreed to an investigation of the condition of Princes Wharf. Mr. Herman K Hutchinson was the engineer to oversee the reconstruction of Princes Wharf. After much discussion and research, Mr. Hutchinson recommended the Princes Wharf be rebuilt in concrete. This was a courageous and farsighted decision at the time ‘concrete was not a well understood readily accepted material for wharf construction in Australia.’ At a conference in Melbourne in 1928, Professor Chapman discussed the increasing importance of concrete in the building trade. The strength of the concrete depended not only upon the proportions of the mix of cement, sand, stone and water but also upon the temperature and its age. In Tasmania, Goliath Cement at Railton used a quality limestone lode which seems to be the key to the quality of the cement produced.

In 1939, Princes Wharf was put to tender to build a replacement wharf and a shed measuring 450 ft by 90 ft. The tender was won by Claude Cooper and Sons, Builders and contractors. Even though Claude Cooper was not the lowest cost tender, he won the contract because he would build it in four months less time than the other tenderers. Cooper knew his tender would be accepted as he could build the wharf and shed between fruit seasons and not interrupt the shipping of fruit to parts of Australia and overseas.

In the Hobart Mercury in 1941, the Marine Board stated that they doubted there was a better shed in Australia.

Shed No 2 appears to pre-date the 1939 re-development, since it is visible as complete in a 1940 photograph of the same..

In 1953, a third shed was added, The No. 3 Shed, described as "a general cargo shed on Princes Wharf 3. It was used for storing goods and materials - such as grain from the nearby grain silos - coming and going from the Port of Hobart."

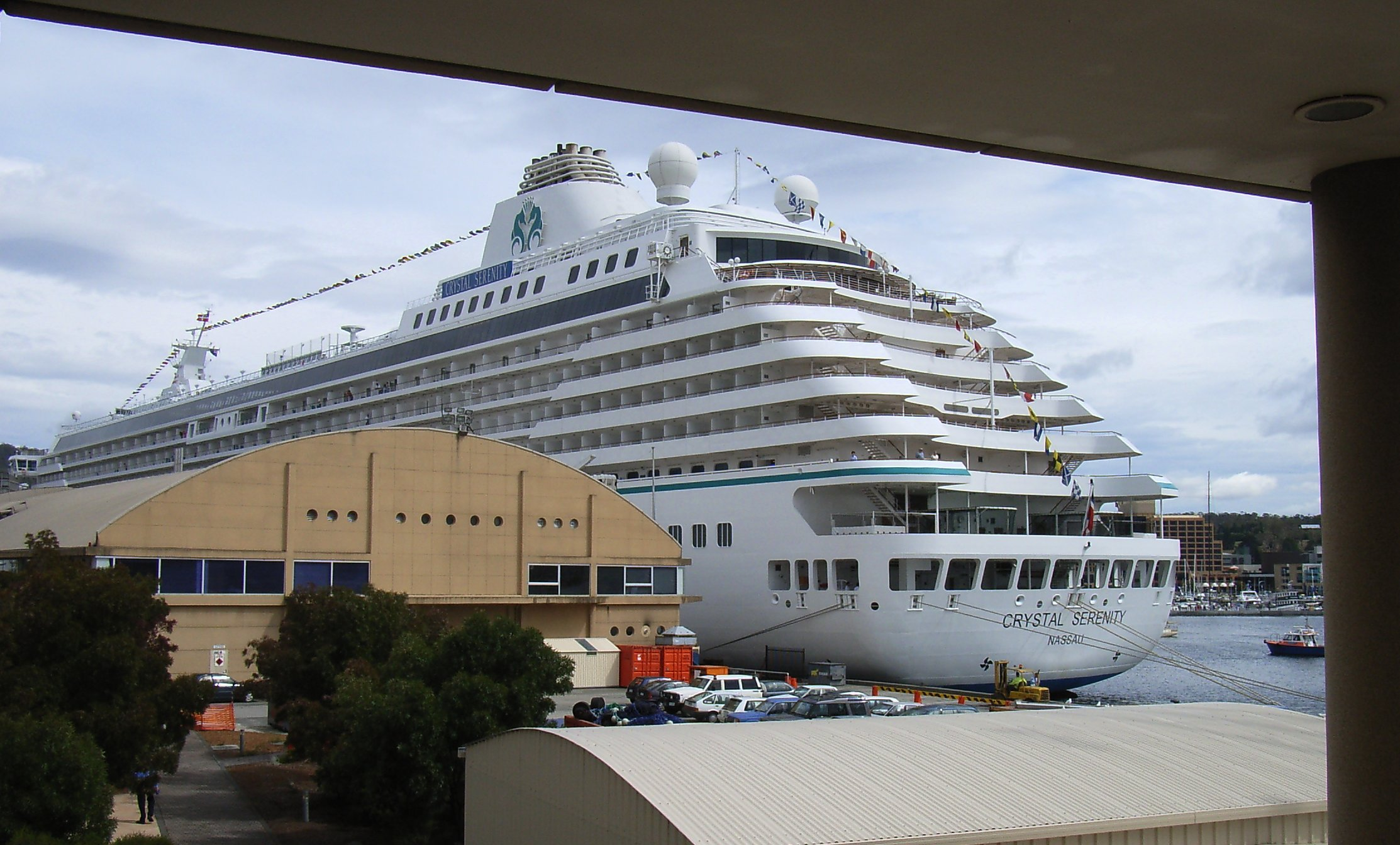
CSIRO Marine Labs Block 1 (former Princes Wharf Shed 3) plus cruise ship "Crystal Serenity", Hobart, February 2005

This shed was subsequently redeveloped in situ to form a new services building for the adjacent CSIRO Marine Laboratories complex being constructed at the end of the wharf in around 1982–84 (see below). It is known as "Block 1" (aka "Support Facilities" aka "Building 5") of the CSIRO Marine Laboratories complex and its wharfside position means that CSIRO Research vessels can moor alongside it as required, as can visiting cruise ships when the CSIRO vessel/s are not in residence.

Around 1964–65 the end of Princes Wharf furthest from the City Centre was extended by reclamation for use as the ferry terminal for the newly commissioned vehicle and passenger ferry Empress of Australia, at that time the largest passenger ferry built in the world, which ran once a fortnight between Hobart and Sydney. This service was discontinued in 1972 and the site became vacant until re-purposed in 1982 as the new home for the marine Divisions of CSIRO, Australia's national science research agency (CSIRO Oceans and Atmosphere in its last incarnation), previously located at Hungry Point in Cronulla. The original vehicle access ramp for the Empress of Australia still exists as part of the CSIRO buildings complex, but is presently disused.

Technically the wharf exists in four numbered portions: wharves numbers one through three correspond to the portions where the equivalent numbered Sheds stand or stood, while wharf number four is now occupied by the CSIRO Marine Laboratories complex (which has also taken over wharf 3).

=== No 1 Shed ===
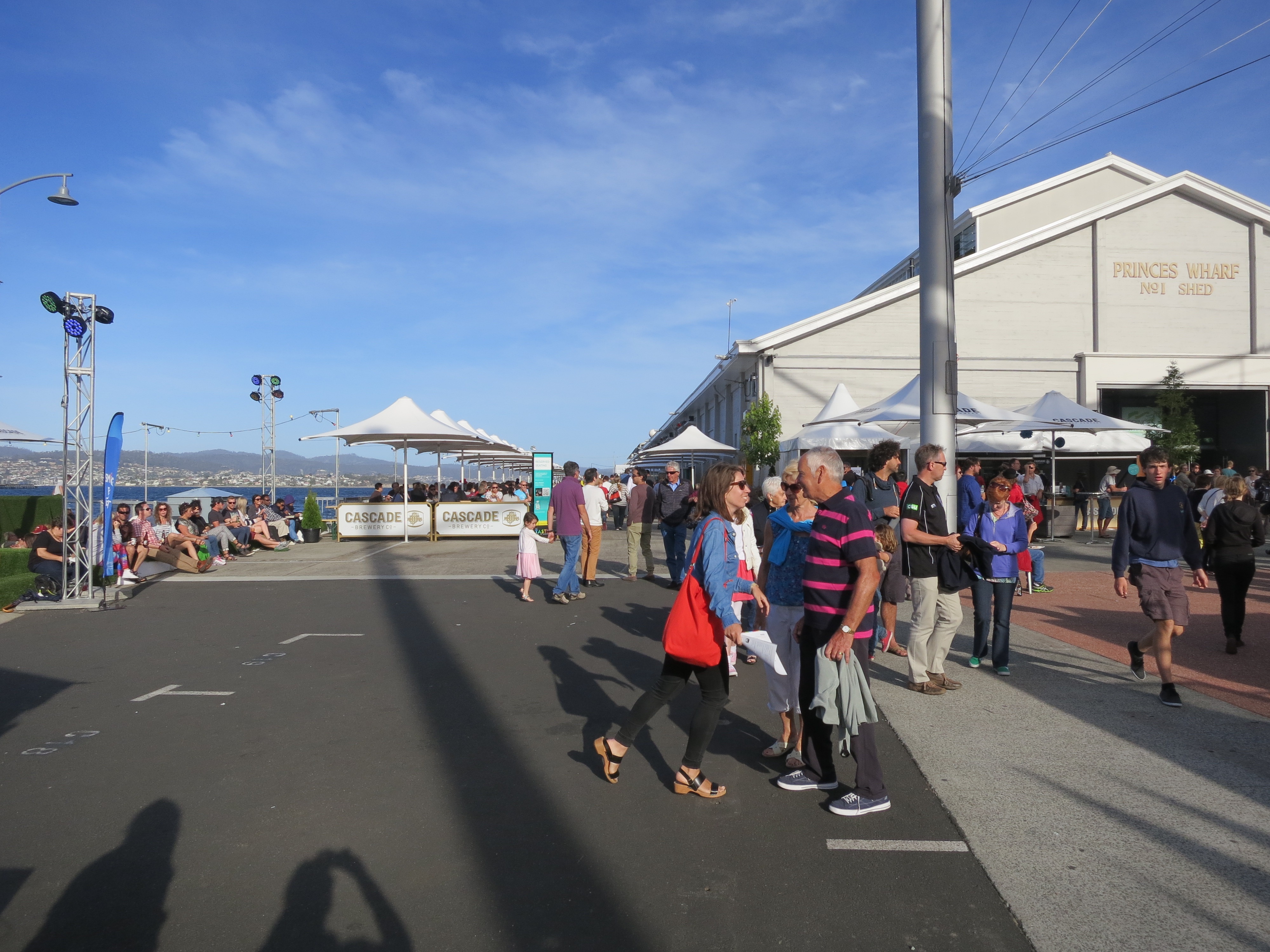
"Taste of Tasmania" festival utilizing the No. 1 Shed, Summer 2015

In 2003, apart from its use as the venue for the Taste of Tasmania festival, the No 1 Shed was being primarily used as a car park. Later that year, the State Government, the owner of the Princes Wharf No. 1 and No. 2, was considering selling the site to private developers as part of a Hobart waterfront development project. However, there were concerns about future access to the site, and the continuation of the Taste of Tasmania festival. Some Hobart City Council members suggested that the council should purchase Princes Wharf No 1 for use as a conference venue.

In 2007, there was criticism of condition of the building, questioning its continued suitability as the venue for Taste of Tasmania festival. The concerns included the presence of asbestos in the roof. In late 2009, the State Government committed to a major redevelopment, including the removal of asbestos in the roof, and the installation of insulation and solar panels. The design was intended to provide a multi-purpose community events centre that could be used for exhibitions, festivals, conferences, arts events and concerts. The construction work commenced in 2010 and was planned in two stages, to work around the Taste Tasmania festival, and the annual music and arts festival Mona Foma.

The venue became branded as PW1. In 2016, a three year venue management contract was awarded to TM Management Group, against a background of significant operating losses incurred by the State Government. At the time, the venue was described as one of the state’s top event venues.

=== No 2 Shed ===
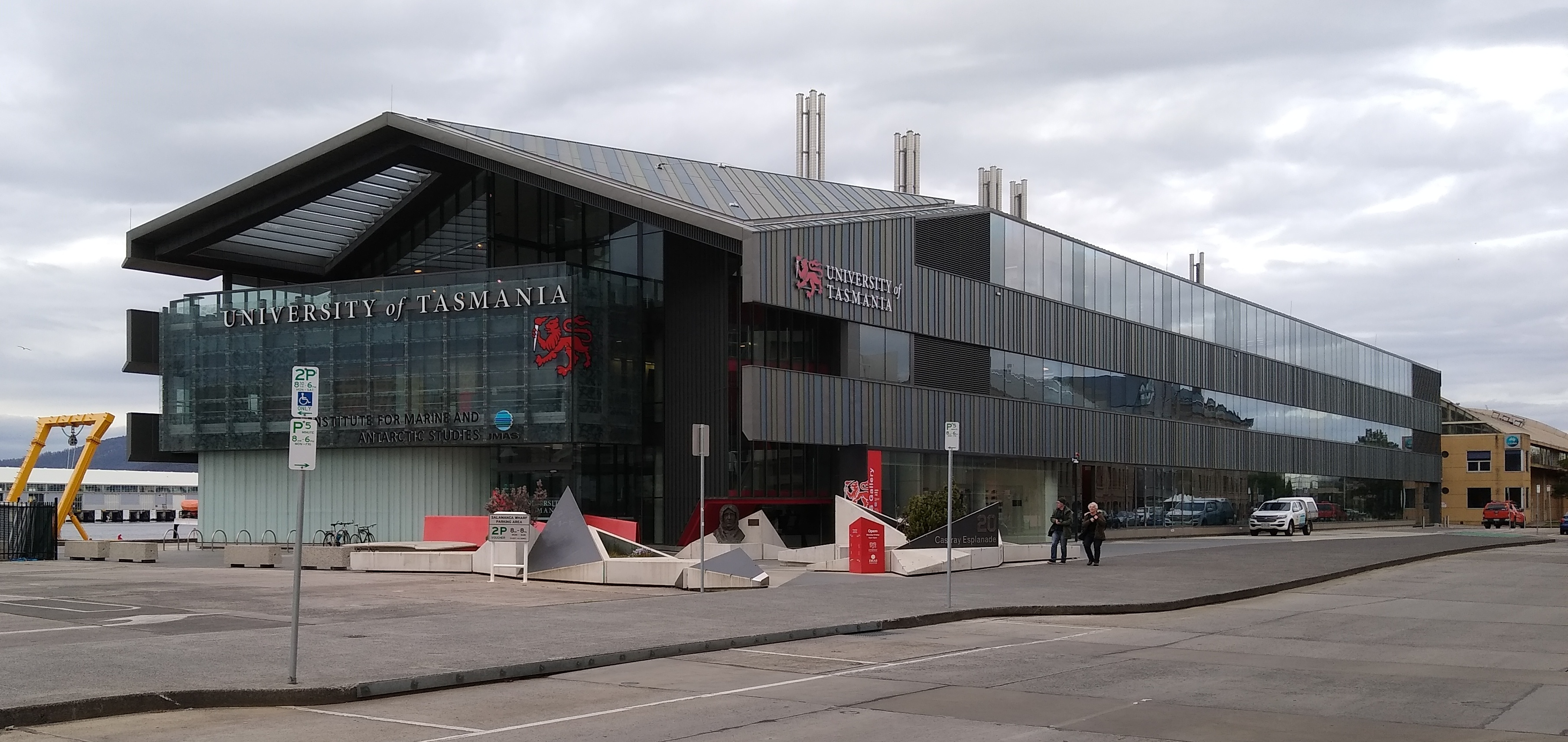
Institute for Marine and Antarctic Studies, constructed on the site of the former No. 2 Shed

Princes Wharf Shed No. 2 was demolished in 2012 and the site redeveloped for the University of Tasmania's Institute for Marine and Antarctic Studies. A new 69,000m² building was completed in 2013, to co-locate IMAS, Australia's Integrated Marine Observing System (IMOS), the Antarctic Climate and Ecosystems Cooperative Research Centre (ACE CRC), and the Tasmanian Partnership for Advanced Computing (TPAC) staff and students. Princes Wharf has been a base for the operations of Antarctic vessels.
